= The Singles (The Bluetones album) =

2002 compilation album by the Bluetones

Compilation album by The Bluetones
- Released: 8 April 2002
- Recorded: 1995–2002
- Studio: Ridge Farm, Surrey, England; Rockfield, Monmouthshire, Wales; Sawmills, Golant, England
- Genre: Britpop; indie pop; indie rock
- Label: Mercury, Superior Quality
- Producer: Hugh Jones; The Bluetones; Gordon Mills

The Bluetones chronology
Science & Nature (2000)	The Singles (2002)	Luxembourg (2003)

Singles from The Singles
- 1. "After Hours" Released: 25 March 2002

Professional ratings
Review scores
Source	Rating
Allmusic	link
Drowned in Sound	link
NME	link

The Singles is a greatest hits compilation album by the English indie rock band the Bluetones. It was released on 8 April 2002 by Mercury Records. As well as featuring all of their singles from 1995 to 2002, it features four exclusive songs and a limited edition second disc. Its single was "After Hours" and the album peaked at number fourteen on the UK Albums Chart.

In 2019, the LP was released on 180g heavyweight blue vinyl for the first time through Demon Music Group.

== Production ==
After three studio albums, Mercury suggested a greatest hits record despite the fact that the band thought they were too early in their career for that. Since they had little choice in it, they compromised by writing additional tracks for it. Its commercial was directed by Edgar Wright.

== Track listing ==
All tracks are written by Morriss, Devlin, Morriss, Chesters. Adrian Mitchell was credited for additional songwriting on track 2 and Richard Payne wrote tracks 11-14 with the band.

No.	Title	Length
1.	"Are You Blue or Are You Blind?"	2:54
2.	"Bluetonic"	4:04
3.	"Slight Return"	3:19
4.	"Cut Some Rug"	4:35
5.	"Marblehead Johnson"	3:22
7.	"Solomon Bites the Worm"	3:07
8.	"If..."	5:08
9.	"Sleazy Bed Track"	4:36
10.	"4-Day Weekend"	3:54
11.	"Keep the Home Fires Burning"	3:27
12.	"Autophilia (or How I Learned to Stop Worrying and Love My Car)"	5:02
13.	"Mudslide"	4:22
14.	"After Hours"	3:34
15.	"Freeze Dried Pop (Dumb It Up)"	2:26
16.	"Persuasion"	4:08
17.	"The Bluetones Big Score"	3:54

All tracks are written by Morriss, Devlin, Morriss, Chesters except where noted.

Bonus Disc (Limited Edition release only)

No.	Title	Writer(s)	Length
1.	"After Hours (Bonus Track Version)"
2.	"Pretty Ballerina" (Edited)	Michael Brown
3.	"Blue"
4.	"Blue Shadows"
5.	"That's Life"	Dean Kay, Kelly Gordon
