= If... (The Bluetones song) =

1998 single by the Bluetones

Single by the Bluetones

from the album Return to the Last Chance Saloon
- B-side: "Blue Shadows" "The Watchman"
- Released: 27 April 1998
- Recorded: 1997
- Studio: Rockfield
- Genre: Alternative rock
- Length: 5:12
- Label: A&M, Superior Quality
- Songwriters: Mark Morriss; Adam Devlin; Scott Morriss; Eds Chesters; Randy Newman
- Producer: Hugh Jones

The Bluetones singles chronology
"Solomon Bites the Worm" (1998)	"If..." (1998)	"Sleazy Bed Track" (1998)

Music video
- "If..." on YouTube

"If..." is a song by the English indie rock band the Bluetones, released as the second single from their second album, Return to the Last Chance Saloon (1998) on 27 April 1998, by A&M Records. Peaking at number thirteen on the UK Singles Chart, its first B-side is a cover of "Blue Shadows on the Trail", originally composed by Randy Newman for the 1968 western comedy film ¡Three Amigos!. Its music video was directed by Tony Hill.

In 2002, it was included on the band's greatest hits Mercury Records compilation, The Singles. It was later featured on their 2006 two-disc and limited three-disc CD compilation, A Rough Outline: The Singles & B-sides 95 - 03.

== Background ==
The song's title comes from the 1968 drama film If... and its single cover has the same font used for it. Part of its lyrics come from the country single released in the same year by Glen Campbell, "Wichita Lineman".

== Track listing ==
UK CD single

1. "If..." – 5:12
2. "Blue Shadows" – 2:38
3. "The Watchman" – 2:57

UK 7-inch vinyl, cassette

1. "If..." – 5:12
2. "Blue Shadows" – 2:38

== Credits ==
Credits taken from the Return to the Last Chance Saloon booklet and CD single notes.

The Bluetones

- Mark Morriss – vocals, backing vocals (track 1, 2), handclaps (track 1), songwriter (tracks 1, 3)
- Adam Devlin – guitar, backing vocals (track 1), handclaps (track 1), songwriter (tracks 1, 3)
- Scott Morriss – bass, backing vocals (tracks 1, 3), handclaps (track 1), songwriter (tracks 1, 3)
- Eds Chesters – drums, percussion, backing vocals (track 1), handclaps (track 1), songwriter (tracks 1, 3)

Additional musicians

- Richard Payne – keys, songwriter (tracks 1, 3)
- Hugh Jones – backing vocals (track 1), handclaps (track 1)
- Randy Newman – songwriter (track 2)

Production

- Hugh Jones – producer, mixer
- Phil Auty – mix engineer (track 1)
- Scott Morriss – original painting

== Reception ==
NME wrote in March 1998 that the track has a "creeping funk to it which emphasises the musical versatility of a band once seen in some quarters as an inexcusably lily-livered, terminally generic bunch of white guitar weeds." Anthony Thornton of The Sunday Telegraph stated that they were "cruising in neutral and letting the jangle do the work for them". Melissa Gunn shared her appreciation with the single in June 1998 despite many criticism written within her review, saying that it displays "true brilliance of the Bluetones with unique lyrics and fantastic background accompaniment."

== Charts ==
Chart (1998)	Peak position
UK Singles (Official Charts)	13
