= Bluetonic =

1995 single by the Bluetones

Single by the Bluetones

from the album Expecting to Fly
- B-side: "Colorado Beetle" "Glad to See Y'Back Again?"
- Released: 2 October 1995
- Recorded: 9 April 1995
- Studio: Ridge Farm (Surrey, England)
- Genre: Indie rock; Britpop
- Label: Superior Quality
- Songwriters: Mark Morriss; Adam Devlin; Scott Morriss; Eds Chesters; Adrian Mitchell
- Producer: Hugh Jones

The Bluetones singles chronology
"Are You Blue or Are You Blind?" (1995)	"Bluetonic" (1995)	"Slight Return" (1996)

Music video
- "Bluetonic" on YouTube

"Bluetonic" is a song by the English indie rock band the Bluetones. Lyricised by Mark Morriss, the song was released by Superior Quality Recordings as the first single from their 1996 debut album, Expecting to Fly, on 2 October 1995. It reached number 19 on the UK Singles Chart. The single was included on the band's 2002 greatest hits compilation, The Singles, as well as their 2002 compilation, A Rough Outline: The Singles & B-sides 95 - 03.

== Background ==
"Bluetonic" was written on a Saturday night, when the band's lead singer Mark Morriss would usually see his former girlfriend, and was the eleventh track by the band. He was up the whole night with a chord progression and completed the first draft on Sunday morning.

When Morriss was studying English, the poem "Celia Celia" by Adrian Mitchell was written on one of the walls in the room that ended up getting stuck in his head. He implemented part of the poem into the single's lyrics:

When I am sad and weary
When all my hope is gone
I walk around my house and
I think of you with nothing on

— Mark Morriss, "Bluetonic"

Morriss stated in September 1995 that when writing "Bluetonic", he wanted to write something that was "melancholy, but not too depressing."

The song was originally titled "No. 11" and its demo recording appeared on the Fierce Panda Records 1994 EP compilation, Return To Splendour. Its title changed within the same month of its appearance on the compilation in December.

One of its B-sides, "Colorado Beetle" has been speculated by fans to reference the actual Colorado potato beetle.

== Recording ==
"Bluetonic" and its B-sides were the first songs recorded in the beginning session for Expecting to Fly. It took place at Ridge Farm Studio in Surrey on 9 April 1995. Their guitarist, Adam Devlin cited his memories of recording the song as "the day that Daniel Amokachi scored twice to knock Spurs out of the FA Cup and fire Everton to the final."

== Reception ==
Melody Maker called "Bluetonic" a "classic melancholy pop single", comparing it to the Smiths' "Well I Wonder", the Stone Roses' "Waterfall", and the Field Mice's "So Sad". Sylvia Patterson of NME gave it Single of the Week in September 1995, writing it is "incorrigibly cheery". In Everett True's February 1996 review of Expecting to Fly for Melody Maker, he stated that the single, alongside "Slight Return", contains "incandescent beauty". "Bluetonic" was voted number fifteen on 1995's John Peel's Festive Fifty.

== Music video ==
Mark Morriss in front of the service station toilets

The music video for "Bluetonic" was directed by Dom and Nic at their production company, Oil Factory, who also directed the band's later video for their second stand-alone single, "Marblehead Johnson", released on 16 September 1996. The beginning of the video was filmed at King's Cross in London, later at a service station corridor and toilets in the evening, and in a stubble field at sunrise the next morning.

The initial premise for the video was that the band were on the run from going on a heist, while wearing cat masks made out of papier-mâché. The video also features a cameo appearance from Gareth McLennan, an old college friend of Morriss, who later directed the video for their 2003 single "Fast Boy".

The video was included on both the band's November 1997 Mondo Concerto VHS release and their October 2007 Blue Movies DVD. Upon its release, it featured on The Chart Show and Top of the Pops.

== Track listing ==
All songs were written by Mark Morriss, Eds Chesters, Adam Devlin and Scott Morriss, except track 1 – Mark Morriss, Eds Chesters, Adam Devlin, Scott Morriss and Adrian Mitchell.

CD, 12-inch single

1. "Bluetonic" – 4:07
2. "Colorado Beetle" – 4:04
3. "Glad to See Y'Back Again?" – 3:25

Cassette, 7-inch single

1. "Bluetonic" – 4:07
2. "Glad to See Y'Back Again?" – 3:25

== Credits and personnel ==
Credits are taken from the Expecting to Fly album booklet and CD single notes.

The Bluetones

- Mark Morriss – vocals
- Adam Devlin – guitar
- Scott Morriss – bass guitar, backing vocals
- Eds Chesters – drums

Additional personnel

- Adrian Mitchell – songwriter
- Hugh Jones – production
- Helen Woodward – mix engineering
- Geoff Pesche – mastering
- Trevor Ray Hart – photography

== Charts ==
Chart (1995)	Peak position
UK Singles (Official Charts)	19
