= Cut Some Rug / Castle Rock =

1996 single by the Bluetones

"Cut Some Rug" / "Castle Rock"

Single by the Bluetones

from the album Expecting to Fly
- B-side: "The Devil Behind My Smile"
- Released: 29 April 1996
- Recorded: Mid-1995
- Studio: Ridge Farm (Surrey, England)
- Length: 4:36 ("Cut Some Rug"); 3:11 ("Castle Rock")
- Label: Superior Quality
- Songwriters: Mark Morriss; Eds Chesters; Adam Devlin; Scott Morriss
- Producer: Hugh Jones

The Bluetones singles chronology
"Slight Return" (1996)	"Cut Some Rug" / "Castle Rock" (1996)	"Marblehead Johnson" (1996)

Music video
- "Cut Some Rug" on YouTube

"Cut Some Rug" and "Castle Rock" are two songs by English indie rock band the Bluetones, issued as a double A-side single. It was released as the third single from their 1996 debut album, Expecting to Fly, on 29 April 1996. The single reached number seven on the UK Singles Chart. Both tracks were included on the band's 2006 compilation, A Rough Outline: The Singles & B-Sides 95 – 03. "Cut Some Rug" earlier appeared on their 2002 greatest hits compilation, The Singles.

== Background ==
"Cut Some Rug" was written about the band giving up on trying to earn money, going on the dole, spending all of their time together writing and crafting songs that ended up being compiled together as Expecting to Fly.

According to the CD liner notes for the Japanese release of the single, when they visited Japan in November 1995, they discovered a bootleg album with "Cut Some Rug" listed as "Castle Rock", and decided to actually create a song with the title.

Just before flying to Scotland to play T in the Park on 5 August 1995, their bassist, Scott Morriss had finished some "bass nonsense". Upon arriving back on the evening of 6 August, their producer, Hugh Jones wanted their guitarist, Adam Devlin to provide the guitar parts, which he was not in the mood to perform. Devlin joked "if the guitars sound a bit angry on the recording, that's the reason why."

The single's B-side, "The Devil Behind My Smile", was lyricised by Devlin.

== Release and promotion ==
After charting within the UK top 40, the single appeared on The Chart Show on 5 May 1996. A mimed performance with live vocals was also broadcast on Top of the Pops on 9 May.

== Reception ==
Music Week called "Cut Some Rug" a "driving guitar groover displaying a particularly rocky side for the first time on the album", referring to it as one of the highlights from Expecting to Fly.

== Music video ==
The music video for the single was directed by direction duo Hammer & Tongs and was set in a fake laundrette. Towards the end of the video, an extra goes into a washing machine and spins round in it. Because of this, a parental advisory label was added to the video issuing a warning saying "do not try this at home". The band said they were only involved for a few hours during shooting since they were touring the UK at the time it was being filmed.

== Track listings ==
All songs were written by Mark Morriss, Eds Chesters, Adam Devlin, and Scott Morriss.

UK CD single

1. "Cut Some Rug" – 4:36
2. "Castle Rock" – 3:11
3. "The Devil Behind My Smile" – 3:01

UK 7-inch and cassette single

1. "Cut Some Rug" – 4:36
2. "Castle Rock" – 3:11

Japanese CD single

1. "Cut Some Rug" – 4:36
2. "Castle Rock" – 3:11
3. "The Devil Behind My Smile" – 3:01
4. "No. 11" (version)

== Credits and personnel ==
Credits are taken from the Expecting to Fly album booklet.

Studio

- Recorded in mid-1995 at Ridge Farm Studios (Surrey, England)

Personnel

- Mark Morriss – writing, vocals
- Eds Chesters – writing, drums, percussion
- Adam Devlin – writing, six-string guitar, twelve-string guitar
- Scott Morriss – writing, vocals, electric bass guitar
- Hugh Jones – production, mixing
- Helen Woodward – mix engineering
- Geoff Pesche – mastering

== Charts ==
Chart (1996)	Peak position
Europe (Eurochart Hot 100)	48
Scottish Singles Sales (Official Charts)	4
UK Singles (Official Charts)	7

== Release history ==
Region	Date	Format(s)	Label(s)	Ref.
United Kingdom	29 April 1996	7-inch vinyl; CD; cassette	Superior Quality	
Japan	1 June 1996	CD	A&M	
