= List of UK Independent Singles Chart number ones of 1996 =

These are UK Official Indie Chart number one hits of 1996.Complied by Music Week

Issue date	Song	Artist	Record label	ref
6 January	"It's Oh So Quiet"	Björk	One Little Indian	
13 January	"Wonderwall"	Oasis	Creation	
20 January	"Wonderwall"	Oasis	Creation	
27 January	"Too Hot"	Coolio	Tommy Boy	
3 February	"Whole Lotta Love"	Goldbug	Acid Jazz	
10 February	"Slight Return"	The Bluetones	Superior Quality	
17 February	"Slight Return"	The Bluetones	Superior Quality	
24 February	"Slight Return"	The Bluetones	Superior Quality	
2 March	"Hyperballad"	Björk	One Little Indian	
9 March	"Don't Look Back in Anger"	Oasis	Creation	
16 March	"Don't Look Back in Anger"	Oasis	Creation	
23 March	"Don't Look Back in Anger"	Oasis	Creation	
30 March	"Being Brave"	Menswear	Laurel	
6 April	"Don't Look Back in Anger"	Oasis	Creation	
13 April	"The X-Files Theme"	DJ Dado	ZYX	
20 April	"The X-Files Theme"	DJ Dado	ZYX	
27 April	"The X-Files Theme"	DJ Dado	ZYX	
4 May	"Goldfinger"	Ash	Infectious	
11 May	"Sale of the Century"	Sleeper	Indolent	
18 May	"Cut Some Rug/Castle Rock"	The Bluetones	Superior Quality	
25 May	"Move Move Move (The Red Tribe)"	Manchester United F.C.	Music Collections	
1 June	"Blue Moon/Only You"	John Alford	Love This	
8 June	"Do U Know Where You're Coming From"	M-Beat featuring Jamiroquai	Renk	
15 June	"Female of the Species"	Space	Gut	
22 June	"Female of the Species"	Space	Gut	
29 June	"Female of the Species"	Space	Gut	
6 July	"Something for the Weekend"	The Divine Comedy	Setanta	
13 July	"Oh Yeah"	Ash	Infectious	
20 July	"Born Slippy .NUXX"	Underworld	Cooking Vinyl	
27 July	"Born Slippy .NUXX"	Underworld	Cooking Vinyl	
3 August	"Born Slippy .NUXX"	Underworld	Cooking Vinyl	
10 August	"Born Slippy .NUXX"	Underworld	Cooking Vinyl	
17 August	"Trash"	Suede	Nude	
24 August	"Born Slippy .NUXX"	Underworld	Cooking Vinyl	
31 August	"We've Got It Goin' On"	The Backstreet Boys	Jive	
7 September	"We've Got It Goin' On"	The Backstreet Boys	Jive	
14 September	"One to Another"	The Charlatans	Beggars Banquet	
21 September	"One to Another"	The Charlatans	Beggars Banquet	
28 September	"On a Rope"	Rocket from the Crypt	Elemental	
5 October	"Marblehead Johnson"	The Bluetones	Superior Quality	
12 October	"Marblehead Johnson"	The Bluetones	Superior Quality	
19 October	"You're Gorgeous"	Babybird	The Echo Label	
26 October	"You're Gorgeous"	Babybird	The Echo Label	
2 November	"Beautiful Ones"	Suede	Nude	
9 November	"You're Gorgeous"	Babybird	The Echo Label	
16 November	"Possibly Maybe"	Björk	One Little Indian	
23 November	"The Frog Princess"	The Divine Comedy	Setanta	
30 November	"I'll Never Break Your Heart"	The Backstreet Boys	Jive	
7 December	"I'll Never Break Your Heart"	The Backstreet Boys	Jive	
14 December	"Twisted (Everyday Hurts)"	Skunk Anansie	One Little Indian	
21 December	"Forever"	Damage	Big Life	
28 December	"Forever"	Damage	Big Life	

== See also ==
- 1996 in music
