= Solomon Bites the Worm =

1998 single by the Bluetones

Single by the Bluetones

from the album Return to the Last Chance Saloon
- B-side: "I Was a Teenage Jesus" "I Walked All Night"
- Released: 9 February 1998
- Recorded: 1997
- Studio: Rockfield
- Genre: Rock; indie rock
- Length: 3:09
- Label: A&M; Superior Quality
- Songwriters: Mark Morriss; Adam Devlin; Scott Morriss; Eds Chesters
- Lyricist: Mark Morriss
- Producer: Hugh Jones

The Bluetones singles chronology
"Marblehead Johnson" (1996)	"Solomon Bites the Worm" (1998)	"If..." (1998)

"Solomon Bites the Worm" is a song by the English indie rock band the Bluetones, released as the first single from their second studio album, Return to the Last Chance Saloon (1998) on 9 February 1998 by A&M Records under the band's sublabel, Superior Quality Recordings. Peaking at number 10 on the UK Singles Chart, its music video was directed by John Hardwick.

In 2006, the song was included on the band's compilation album, A Rough Outline: The Singles & B-Sides 95 - 03. Written by their frontman Mark Morriss, the lyrics are based on the 1842 nursery rhyme "Solomon Grundy".

== Track listing ==
Tracks one and two were written by Mark Morriss, Adam Devlin, Scott Morriss, and Eds Chesters. Track three was written by Hargus "Pig" Robbins.

CD

1. "Solomon Bites the Worm" – 3:10
2. "I Was a Teenage Jesus" – 3:14
3. "I Walked All Night" – 2:20

7"

1. "Solomon Bites the Worm" – 3:10
2. "I Was a Teenage Jesus" – 3:14

== Personnel ==
Personnel per CD single notes.

The Bluetones

- Mark Morriss – vocals
- Adam Devlin – guitar
- Scott Morriss – bass guitar, backing vocals
- Eds Chesters – drums

Additional personnel

- Hugh Jones – producer, mixer
- Phil Auty – mix engineer (track 1)
- Scott Morriss – original painting

== Charts ==
Chart (1998)	Peak position
UK Singles (Official Charts)	10
