= Sleazy Bed Track =

Single by The Bluetones

from the album Return to the Last Chance Saloon
- Released: 27 July 1998
- Length: 4:41
- Label: Superior Quality
- Songwriter(s): Eds Chesters, Adam Devlin, Mark Morriss, Scott Morriss
- Producer(s): Hugh Jones

The Bluetones singles chronology
"If..." (1998)	"Sleazy Bed Track" (1998)	"4-Day Weekend" (1998)

"Sleazy Bed Track" is a song by The Bluetones, released as the third single from their second album, 1998's Return to the Last Chance Saloon. It was also included on the band's 2006 compilation A Rough Outline: The Singles & B-Sides 95 - 03, and on the soundtrack to the 2010 Universal Pictures movie Scott Pilgrim vs. the World.

The single contains the b-side "Blue", a cover version of the 1980s Rain Parade song. Select magazine's review of "Sleazy Bed Track" in August 1998 marked its "astonishing resemblance" to "Fall at Your Feet" by Crowded House. Music Week wrote: "[T]his track is a live favourite and an album standout. It's a swoony ballad with a wonderful melancholic feel which reveals a more mainstream approach to their songwriting."

== Track listing ==
- CD
1. "Sleazy Bed Track"
2. "The Ballad of Muldoon"
3. "Blue"
- Cassette / 7"
1. "Sleazy Bed Track"
2. "The Ballad of Muldoon"
