= After Hours (The Bluetones song) =

2002 single by the Bluetones

Single by the Bluetones

from the album The Singles
- B-side: "Groovy Roussos" "Sail on Sailor" "Reverse Cow Girl" "Woman in Love" "Ingimarsson"
- Released: 25 March 2002
- Recorded: 2002
- Genre: Indie rock
- Length: 3:35
- Label: Mercury; Superior Quality
- Songwriters: Mark Morriss; Adam Devlin; Scott Morriss; Eds Chesters; Richard Payne
- Producers: The Bluetones; John Cornfield

The Bluetones singles chronology
"Autophilia (or How I Learned to Stop Worrying and Love My Car)" (2000)	"After Hours" (2002)	"Fast Boy/Liquid Lips" (2003)

Music video
- "After Hours" on YouTube

"After Hours" is a song by the English indie rock band the Bluetones, released as the only single from their 2002 greatest hits compilation, The Singles, on 25 March 2002 by Mercury Records. Peaking at number 26 on the UK Singles Chart, the song was issued on two CDs and 7-inch vinyl, which all contained different B-sides. Two of its B-sides were covers of "Sail On, Sailor" by the Beach Boys and "Woman in Love" by Barbra Streisand. In 2006, it was listed on their compilation album, A Rough Outline: The Singles & B-sides 95 - 03.

== Background ==
The band were unkeen towards the idea of compiling a greatest hits album as they only had three studio albums out at that point, but Mercury Records were the "paymasters" and were "going to do it with or without our permission". Their lead singer, Mark Morriss, said that "After Hours" was "bashed out" because they needed a B-side. The single was written about an alcoholic drinking the whole night.

== Reception ==
In his review for "After Hours", Ted Kessler of NME wrote that "The Bluetones make excellently quirky, tuneful and artful singles" and "as long they continue to service their blue army with wry English guitar pop as punchy as this they’ll still prosper long after we’re all dead."

== Music video ==
The music video for "After Hours" was directed by Edgar Wright and features children from Sylvia Young Theatre School portrayed as gangsters in a bar, being served milk instead of alcohol. It was recorded in one continuous Steadicam shot take, and Wright reflected that if he did not direct it he most likely would not have had the confidence to use the technique again for his 2004 film, Shaun of the Dead. Auditions lasted two days and the actors were given around eight hours to learn their choreography.

The video was inspired by the 1976 musical comedy film, Bugsy Malone, and the band initially wanted to use Jim Henson muppets in a bar although changed their minds as the rock band Supergrass released a video with a similar premise for their 1999 single "Pumping on Your Stereo".

== Track listing ==
Tracks one, two, four, and six were written by Mark Morriss, Adam Devlin, Scott Morriss, Eds Chesters, and Richard Payne.Track three was written by Brian Wilson, Tandyn Almer, John Rieley, and Ray Kennedy. Track five was written by Barry Gibb and Robin Gibb.

CD1

- "After Hours" – 3:35
- "Groovy Roussos" – 3:11
- "Sail on Sailor" – 2:54

CD2

- "After Hours" – 3:35
- "Reverse Cow Girl" – 3:42
- "Woman in Love" – 4:24

7"

- "After Hours" – 3:35
- "Ingimarrson" – 2:55

== Credits and personnel ==
The Bluetones

- Mark Morriss – vocals (tracks 1–3, 4)
- Adam Devlin – guitar
- Scott Morriss – bass, backing vocals (tracks 1–3, 4)
- Eds Chesters – drums

Additional personnel

- Richard Payne – keys
- The Bluetones – producer (tracks 1–6)
- John Cornfield – additional producer, mixer (tracks 1, 6)
- Gordon Mills Jr. – engineer, mixer (tracks 1–5)
- Ben Vincent – paintings

== Charts ==
Chart (2002)	Peak position
UK Singles (Official Charts)	26
