= Expecting to Fly (album) =

1996 studio album by the Bluetones

Studio album by the Bluetones
- Released: 12 February 1996
- Recorded: Summer–autumn 1995
- Studios: Ridge Farm, Surrey, England
- Genres: Britpop; indie pop; jangle pop
- Length: 53:45
- Labels: A&M; Superior Quality
- Producer: Hugh Jones

The Bluetones chronology
Expecting to Fly (1996)	Return to the Last Chance Saloon (1998)

Singles from Expecting to Fly
- 1. "Bluetonic" Released: 2 October 1995; 2. "Slight Return" Released: 22 January 1996; 3. "Cut Some Rug" / "Castle Rock" Released: 29 April 1996

Expecting to Fly is the debut studio album by the English indie rock band the Bluetones, released on 12 February 1996 by A&M Records. Produced by Hugh Jones, it knocked Oasis's (What's the Story) Morning Glory? off the number one spot in the UK Albums Chart for a week. Named after the 1967 Buffalo Springfield single, the album was certified Platinum by the British Phonographic Industry (BPI) in March 1998. Its singles were "Bluetonic", "Slight Return", and "Cut Some Rug".

A 2-CD expanded edition of Expecting to Fly was released on 9 March 2009, as well as a deluxe version released on 6 August 2021 to mark its twenty-fifth release anniversary.

== Background ==
After previously being in a group together called the Bottlegarden, the Bluetones was formed in 1993 by Mark Morriss, Adam Devlin, Scott Morriss and a drummer called Greg who left around the same time they formed. They tried honing a mid-60s Crosby, Stills, Nash & Young sound. Living in a shared house with local Hounslow band Dodgy, Matthew Priest introduced them to Eds Chesters, who was having a difficult time being in the pop group Soho. While still working with Soho, Chesters ended up getting on with the Bluetones well and felt it was inevitable he would end up joining them. After hearing them demo their first written song, "A Parting Gesture", which later made it to the record, he agreed to leave Soho to join them.

After spending their time together writing and perfecting songs, the band started playing live venues and released their debut single, "Are You Blue or Are You Blind?" as a stand-alone through Paradox Records in June 1995. Following this, they released "Bluetonic" as the first single from Expecting to Fly in October, before signing to A&M Records in early 1996, where they would release their following two singles. "Slight Return" was released as the second single in January 1996, after previously being listed on limited edition 7-inch blue vinyl in February 1995 through their sublabel Superior Quality Recordings, released via mail order and at their tour with rock band Supergrass. The reissue of the single peaked at number two on the UK Singles Chart, overtaken by Babylon Zoo's "Spaceman" which gained significant exposure from appearing in a Levi's jeans television advertisement. Two months after the release of Expecting to Fly, "Cut Some Rug" was released as a double-A-side single in April, paired with "Castle Rock".

== Recording ==
Their producer, Hugh Jones tried pushing the band at times, trying to get the best result out of them. Before flying to play T in the Park on 5 August, Scott Morriss had finished his "bass nonsense" for "Cut Some Rug". On returning, Jones wanted Adam Devlin to play the guitars for it. For "Things Change", Jones taught Devlin various different reverb techniques, such as plate reverb and spring reverb. Mac McEldon, who played clavinet on the track, spent a week with the band playing keyboards. "The Fountainhead" and "Vampire" were both recorded acoustically before electric guitars were involved. "Carnt Be Trusted" was specifically chosen to be the first song on side two of its vinyl release, which is why it was sampled with a needle coming off and back on a groove between track five and six. For "Putting Out Fires", Jones made Mark Morriss sing for hours since it was the most difficult for him to perform.

== Production ==
Expecting to Fly was recorded at Ridge Farm Studio for five or six weeks during the summer of 1995, excluding the opening track, "Talking to Clarry", which was recorded in the following autumn. "Bluetonic" and its two B-sides were recorded first on 9 April for its forthcoming single release in October. Hugh Jones produced the sessions and mixed the recordings with engineer Helen Woodward. The album was later mastered by Geoff Pesche.

== Reception ==
Professional ratings
Review scores
Source	Rating
AllMusic	4.5/5 stars
The Encyclopedia of Popular Music	4/5 stars
NME	8/10 stars
The Philadelphia Inquirer	3/4 stars
Q	4/5 stars
Rolling Stone	3/5 stars

Q's Sam Taylor wrote, "Perhaps the most accomplished rock debut album since The Stone Roses in 1989, Expecting to Fly avoids the usual primitive drive of first recordings, in favour of technical brilliance and adventurous songwriting... a classic rock album." The List journalist Brian Donaldson likened the Bluetones to "a Squeeze for the 90s", and noted that the record has "excellence exhibited throughout". David Sinclair of Rolling Stone called the album "an accomplished and varied collection of guitar-based tunes with a solid charm rooted in the best traditions of English alternative pop—no more, but certainly no less."

Lily Moayeri of MTV Online wrote that the band had an "instant appeal", comparing them to the sound of a Manchester band as opposed to a London band. She acknowledged the buzz was that they sounded similar to the Stone Roses, although denied this and rather said that "if you liked the Stone Roses, you will probably like the Bluetones." Additionally, she said they were "at their melodic, guitar-driven best on tracks that have a comfortable, classic-pop feel".

Melody Maker placed Expecting to Fly at number nineteen on their 1996's Albums of the Year list. NME ranked it at number eleven on their 1996 critic poll. Radio X included the album in their list of the 25 best Britpop albums, complimenting "Slight Return" as the "most Britpop track".

== Commercial performance ==
Expecting to Fly entered the UK Albums Chart at number one on first-week sales of 82,000. The album was certified Platinum by the British Phonographic Industry (BPI) on 6 March 1998 for 300,000 sales.

== Track listing ==
All tracks written by Mark Morriss, Adam Devlin, Scott Morriss and Eds Chesters, except where noted.

No.	Title	Writer(s)	Length
1.	"Talking to Clarry"		6:52
2.	"Bluetonic"	Morriss, Devlin, Morriss, Chesters, Mitchell	4:08
3.	"Cut Some Rug"		4:32
4.	"Things Change"		5:38
5.	"The Fountainhead"		4:35
6.	"Carnt Be Trusted"		3:50
7.	"Slight Return"		3:21
8.	"Putting Out Fires"		6:22
9.	"Vampire"		4:32
10.	"A Parting Gesture"		4:40
11.	"Time & Again"		5:09
Total length:			53:45

Collector's edition disc 2

No.	Title	Transmitted	Length
1.	"A Parting Gesture" (R1 The John Peel Show, 1994)	18 December 1994	4:10
2.	"Cut Some Rug" (R1 The John Peel Show, 1994)	18 December 1994	4:16
3.	"Bluetonic" (R1 The Mark Radcliffe Show, 1995)	22 May 1995	3:59
4.	"Are You Blue or Are You Blind?" (R1 The Mark Radcliffe Show, 1995)	22 May 1995	2:48
5.	"The Fountainhead" (R1 The Mark Radcliffe Show, 1995)	22 May 1995	3:56
6.	"Time & Again" (R1 The Mark Radcliffe Show, 1995)	22 May 1995	4:59
7.	"Driftwood" (R1 The Mark Radcliffe Show, 1995)	22 May 1995	3:45
8.	"Carnt Be Trusted" (R1 The Mark Radcliffe Show, 1995)	22 May 1995	3:18
9.	"Are You Blue or Are You Blind?" (Sound City 1995 Bristol)	7 February 1995	2:53
10.	"Cut Some Rug" (Sound City 1995 Bristol)	7 February 1995	4:22
11.	"Carnt Be Trusted" (Sound City 1995 Bristol)	7 February 1995	3:28
12.	"Bluetonic" (Sound City 1995 Bristol)	7 February 1995	4:02
13.	"Time & Again" (Sound City 1995 Bristol)	7 February 1995	4:53
Total length:			50:49

== Personnel ==
Personnel per booklet.

The Bluetones

- Mark Morriss – vocals
- Adam Devlin – guitar, 12 string guitar
- Scott Morriss – bass, backing vocals
- Eds Chesters – drums, percussion

Additional musicians

- Caroline Lavelle – cello (track 8)
- Dan Crompton – blues harp (track 10)
- Mac McEldon – clavinet (track 4)

Production

- Hugh Jones – producer, mixing
- Helen Woodward – mixing engineer
- Geoff Pesche – mastering

Design

- Superstock – front cover photography
- Marc Newman – front cover photography
- Roger Sargent – band photography
- Scott Morriss – additional photography
- Trevor Ray Hart – additional photography
- The Bluetones – artwork concept

== Charts ==
Weekly charts

Chart (1996)	Peak position
Australian Albums (ARIA)	44
Scottish Albums (Official Charts)	1
Swedish Albums (Sverigetopplistan)	40
UK Albums (Official Charts)	1

Year-end charts

Chart (1996)	Position
UK Albums (OCC)	44

Singles

Single	Chart (1995/1996)	Peak position
"Bluetonic"	UK Singles (Official Charts)	19
"Slight Return"	Europe (Eurochart Hot 100)	13
"Slight Return"	Finland (Suomen virallinen lista)	19
"Slight Return"	Iceland (Íslenski Listinn Topp 40)	5
"Slight Return"	Ireland (IRMA)	15
"Slight Return"	Scottish Singles Sales (Official Charts)	3
"Slight Return"	Sweden (Sverigetopplistan)	52
"Slight Return"	UK Singles (Official Charts)	2
"Slight Return"	UK Indie (Music Week)	1
"Cut Some Rug"	Europe (Eurochart Hot 100)	48
"Cut Some Rug"	Scottish Singles Sales (Official Charts)	4
"Cut Some Rug"	UK Singles (Official Charts)	7
