= Keep the Home Fires Burning (The Bluetones song) =

2000 single by the Bluetones

Single by the Bluetones

from the album Science & Nature
- B-side: "Armageddon (Outta Here)" "The Favourite Son" "Be Careful What You Dream" "Please Stop Talking"
- Released: 21 February 2000
- Studio: Sawmills, Cornwall, England
- Genre: Indie rock; alternative rock
- Length: 3:27
- Label: Mercury, Superior Quality
- Songwriters: Mark Morriss; Adam Devlin; Scott Morriss; Eds Chesters; Richard Payne
- Producer: John Cornfield

The Bluetones singles chronology
"4-Day Weekend" (1998)	"Keep the Home Fires Burning" (2000)	"Autophilia (or How I Learned to Stop Worrying and Love My Car)" (2000)

Music video
- "Keep the Home Fires Burning" on YouTube

"Keep the Home Fires Burning" is a song by the English indie rock band the Bluetones, released as the first single from their third album Science & Nature (2000) on 21 February 2000, by Mercury Records. Named after a 1914 song from the First World War, it peaked at number thirteen on the UK Singles Chart. One of its B-sides, "Armageddon (Outta Here)" features a commentary sketch starring Matt Lucas. Its music video was directed by Edgar Wright.

An acoustic version of the single was released in the United States as part of their exclusive EP following Science & Nature, Mudslide EP (2000).

The single was listed on the band's Mercury greatest hits compilation, The Singles (2002). As well as this, in 2006, it was included on their two-disc compilation album, A Rough Outline: The Singles & B-sides 95 - 03, along with its American version.

== Reception ==
NME wrote in February 2000 that "Keep the Home Fires Burning" is "lithe" and "competent", comparing it to the Byrds. Jackie Flynn of Dotmusic referred to it as a "perverse brass-infused slice of social commentary with a zesty twist of tango thrown in half way through." in her review for Science & Nature.

== Track listing ==
All tracks are written by Morriss, Devlin, Morriss, Chesters, Payne.

CD1

1. "Keep the Home Fires Burning" – 3:27
2. "Armageddon (Outta Here)" – 3:33
3. "The Favourite Son" – 3:14

CD2

1. "Keep the Home Fires Burning" – 3:27
2. "Be Careful What You Dream" – 3:08
3. "Please Stop Talking" – 2:27
4. "Keep the Home Fires Burning" (enhanced video)

Cassette single

1. "Keep the Home Fires Burning" – 3:27
2. "Please Stop Talking" – 2:27

CD promo

1. "Keep the Home Fires Burning" (radio version) – 3:04
2. "Keep the Home Fires Burning" – 3:27

== Credits and personnel ==
Credits are taken from the Science & Nature album notes and CD single notes.

The Bluetones

- Mark Morriss – vocals
- Adam Devlin – guitar
- Scott Morriss – bass guitar, backing vocals
- Eds Chesters – drums

Additional musicians

- Richard Payne – keys
- Bob Peters – conductor, copyist
- John Hutchens – euphonium
- Chris Hutchens – flugelhorn
- Monty Ray – flugelhorn
- Sky Murphy – trombone
- Therese Shepherd – tuba

Production

- John Cornfield – producer, mixer
- Neil Burrows – management

Design

- Yacht Associates – design, art direction
- Jonathan Shaw – photography
- Scott Morriss – artwork

== Charts ==
Chart (2000)	Peak position
UK Singles (Official Charts)	13
