= Memory Muscle =

2008 solo album by Mark Morriss

Studio album by Mark Morriss
- Released: 26 May 2008
- Recorded: 2007–2008
- Studios: Charlton Farm (Somerset, England); Brackenhurst (Surrey, England)
- Genres: Alternative rock; soft rock; folk
- Length: 37:15
- Labels: Fruitcake; Fulfill
- Producer: Gordon Mills Jr.

Mark Morriss chronology
Memory Muscle (2008)	A Flash of Darkness (2014)

Singles from Memory Muscle
- 1. "I'm Sick" Released: 19 May 2008; 2. "Lay Low" Released: 18 August 2008

Memory Muscle is the debut solo album by the English singer and songwriter Mark Morriss, best known as the lead vocalist of the indie rock band the Bluetones. It was released on 26 May 2008 by Fullfill Records, and followed The Fi-Lo Beddow EP, a self-released EP from February 2006 that consisted of five early recordings of the songs from Memory Muscle, under the pseudonym "Fi-Lo Beddow", as Morriss was at first reluctant to use his own name. Its singles were "I'm Sick" and "Lay Low", which was released as a download-exclusive single. "I'm Sick" peaked at number 55 in the UK Physical Singles Chart.

Following the release of Memory Muscle and the start of his independent career, Morriss spent the year touring the album and joined Matt Berry's live band the Maypoles.

== Background ==
"I thoroughly enjoyed the opportunity to try something on my own for once. Being in the Bluetones has always been a great satisfaction to me creatively, but making this record enabled me to shoulder all the responsibility myself, and it was a very stimulating experience."

— Mark Morriss speaking about the experience of recording Memory Muscle.

After being with his band the Bluetones for twelve consecutive years, Mark Morriss decided to try creating some new music independently. He wrote most songs during a natural break away from the band, which worked out for him since he enjoyed the recording and touring process. The title of the album is a metaphorical concept of the heart or mind as the muscle where emotions are stored, as well as wordplay for "muscle memory".

Morriss cited the American author Kurt Vonnegut as an inspirated for the LP's themes of "pithy, world-weary observations about life, ageing and betrayal" within its lyrics, most noticeably in "So It Goes", which was a phrase he used in many of his books. He revealed that he intended to make a Californian-themed album, recreating the sounds of his favourite records from his youth.

"How Maggie Got Her Bounce Back" was written about Morriss' former partner and how love can help put modern life pressures into perspective. When speaking about "I'm Sick", he said that it was "a collage of images, from childhood in the '70s to being drunk and confused in casualty." "Lemon & Lime" was one of the first songs written for the record and discusses frustration and resentment. The album features two covers – "Alcoholiday" by Teenage Fanclub, and "My Autumn's Done Come" by Lee Hazlewood. Morriss said that he related to Hazlewood as a "a songwriter who has been really underrated".

== Production ==
The drums and bass guitars used for Memory Muscle were recorded at Charlton Farm in Somerset by Louie Nicastro. Everything else was recorded at Brackenhurst in Surrey by Gordon Mills Jr. The strings were arranged by film composer David Arnold who became a fan of Morriss' band the Bluetones since their 1996 debut studio album Expecting to Fly whilst scoring the science fiction action film Independence Day.

== Reception ==
Professional ratings
Review scores
Source	Rating
AllMusic	3.5/5 stars

AllMusic gave Memory Muscle a rating of 3.5/5. Planet Mellotron rated it 3/5. Kirk Burton of Is This Music? described it as a "giant sounding, classic pop record". Steve Carroll of the York Press praised Mark Morriss' "distinctive" vocals and referred to the album as a "creditable" start in his solo career, ranking it 4/5. It was referred to as a "direct successor" to Expecting to Fly.

== Track listing ==
All tracks were written by Mark Morriss, except where noted.

No.	Title	Writer(s)	Length
1.	"How Maggie Got Her Bounce Back"		3:28
2.	"I'm Sick"		3:17
3.	"So It Goes"		3:24
4.	"Buckle Up, Baby Doll"		2:48
5.	"Alcoholiday"	Norman Blake	3:21
6.	"Digging a Hole"		2:56
7.	"Lemon & Lime"		3:11
8.	"Unwanted Friend"		3:35
9.	"Bienvenido"		2:38
10.	"Lay Low"		3:58
11.	"My Autumn's Done Come"	Lee Hazlewood	4:30

== Personnel ==
Personnel per CD notes.

Personnel

- Mark Morriss – vocals, guitar, omni chord
- Gordon Mills Jr. – drums, percussion, mellotron, mandolin, guitar
- Scott Morriss – upright bass guitar, strap-on bass guitar
- Alex Lee-Richards – Hammond organ, Wurlitzer
- Pete Baker – trumpet, flugelhorn
- David Arnold – planner (track 8)
- Cassius Sam – guitar solo (track 4)
- Yoko Von Koko – backing vocals (track 4)
- Louie Nicastro – glockenspiel (track 5)

Additional personnel

- Louie Nicastro – recorded by
- Gordon Mills Jr. – recorded by, mixing
- Ali Fletcher – executive producer
- David Arnold – string arranger, string composer (tracks 1–2, 10)
- Steve Orchard – strings recorded by
- Mark Morriss – mixing
- Paul Agar – design
