= Autophilia (or How I Learned to Stop Worrying and Love My Car) =

2000 single by the Bluetones

Single by the Bluetones

from the album Science & Nature
- B-side: "Thought You'd Be Taller" "It's a Boy" "Soup du Jour" "Vostok of Love"
- Released: 8 May 2000
- Recorded: Summer 1999
- Studio: Sawmills (Cornwall, England)
- Genre: Indie rock; alternative rock
- Length: 5:01
- Label: Mercury; Superior Quality
- Songwriters: Mark Morriss; Adam Devlin; Scott Morriss; Eds Chesters; Richard Payne
- Producer: John Cornfield

The Bluetones singles chronology
"Keep the Home Fires Burning" (2000)	"Autophilia (or How I Learned to Stop Worrying and Love My Car)" (2000)	"After Hours" (2002)

Music video
- "Autophilia (or How I Learned to Stop Worrying and Love My Car)" on YouTube

"Autophilia (or How I Learned to Stop Worrying and Love My Car)" is a song by the English indie rock band the Bluetones. It was released as the second single from their third studio album, Science & Nature (2000), on 8 May 2000 by Mercury Records. Peaking at number 18 on the UK Singles Chart, the song was issued on cassette and two CDs with different B-sides.

The song was also listed on the band's 2002 greatest hits compilation, The Singles, and the following 2006 two-disc compilation, A Rough Outline: The Singles & B-sides 95 - 06.

== Background ==
The Bluetones lead singer, Mark Morriss, was inspired to write the single by a few of his friends at the time who spent too much time on their cars. He became interested in the idea of people becoming fascinated over inanimate objects like "a cup, a phone or your favourite little bag" and used driving as a metaphor for it. The title is a reference to Stanley Kubrick's Dr. Strangelove or: How I Learned to Stop Worrying and Love the Bomb.

== Reception ==
Jackie Flynn of Dotmusic referred to "Autophilia (or How I Learned to Stop Worrying and Love My Car)" as a "weak metaphor stretched to squeaking point over an entire song".

== Music video ==
The music video for "Autophilia (or How I Learned to Stop Worrying and Love My Car)" was directed by Jake & Jim. The video follows the band messing around whilst working at a car wash until their boss' wife drives in with her 1955 Chevrolet Bel Air, which they take and drive in the sky. The band initially tried getting to Joan Collins to play the boss' wife. The video also parodies "Greased Lightnin'" from the 1972 musical Grease.

== Track listing ==
All tracks were written by Mark Morriss, Adam Devlin, Scott Morriss, Eds Chesters, and Richard Payne.

CD1

1. "Autophilia (or How I Learned to Stop Worrying and Love My Car)" – 5:01
2. "Thought You'd Be Taller" – 4:23
3. "It's a Boy" – 4:23

CD2

1. "Autophilia (or How I Learned to Stop Worrying and Love My Car)" – 5:01
2. "Soup du Jour" – 2:19
3. "Vostok of Love" – 3:18
4. "Autophilia (or How I Learned to Stop Worrying and Love My Car)" (enhanced video) – 3:48

Cassette

1. "Autophilia (or How I Learned to Stop Worrying and Love My Car)" – 5:01
2. "It's a Boy" – 4:23

== Credits and personnel ==
The Bluetones

- Mark Morriss – vocals (tracks 1–3, 5)
- Adam Devlin – guitar
- Scott Morriss – bass guitar, backing vocals (tracks 1–2, 4)
- Eds Chesters – drums

Additional personnel

- Richard Payne – keys
- John Cornfield – producer, mixer (track 1)
- The Bluetones – producer, mixer (tracks 2–5)
- Jonathan Shaw – photographer
- Yacht Associates – art direction

== Charts ==
Chart (2000)	Peak position
UK Singles (Official Charts)	18
