= Are You Blue or Are You Blind? =

1995 single by the Bluetones

Single by the Bluetones
- B-side: "String Along" "Driftwood"
- Released: 5 June 1995
- Recorded: 1995
- Genre: Rock; indie rock
- Length: 2:55
- Label: Superior Quality
- Songwriters: Mark Morriss; Adam Devlin; Scott Morriss; Eds Chesters
- Producer: Hugh Jones

The Bluetones singles chronology
"Slight Return" (1995)	"Are You Blue or Are You Blind?" (1995)	"Bluetonic" (1995)

"Are You Blue or Are You Blind?" is a song by the English indie rock band the Bluetones. Produced by Hugh Jones, it was released on 5 June 1996 by their sublabel Superior Quality Recordings as a stand-alone single. Peaking at number 31 on the UK Singles Chart, the single's music video was directed by Thomas Napper.

The song was also included on the band's 1995 European and Japan exclusive EP A Bluetones Companion, and the three compilation albums Are You Blind? (2000), The Singles (2002), A Rough Outline: The Singles & B-sides 95 - 03 (2006).

== Track listings ==
All tracks were written by Mark Morriss, Adam Devlin, Scott Morriss, and Eds Chesters.

UK single (CD)

1. "Are You Blue or Are You Blind?" – 2:55
2. "String Along" – 3:53
3. "Driftwood" – 3:35

UK single (7", 12")

1. "Are You Blue or Are You Blind?" – 2:55
2. "String Along" – 3:53

== Credits and personnel ==
Credits are taken from the CD single.

The Bluetones

- Mark Morriss – vocals
- Adam Devlin – guitar
- Scott Morriss – bass, backing vocals
- Eds Chesters – drums

Additional personnel

- Hugh Jones – producer (track 1), mixer (track 2)
- Peter Jones – producer (tracks 2–3)
- Trevor Ray Hart – photography

== Charts ==
Chart (1995)	Peak position
UK Singles (Official Charts)	31

== Release history ==
Region	Date	Format(s)	Label(s)	Ref.
United Kingdom	5 June	7-inch vinyl; 12-inch vinyl; CD	Superior Quality	
