= Marblehead Johnson =

1996 single by the Bluetones

Single by the Bluetones
- B-side: "The Simple Things"; "Nifkin's Bridge"; "Are You Blue or Are You Blind?"
- Released: 16 September 1996
- Length: 3:21
- Label: Superior Quality
- Songwriters: Eds Chesters; Adam Devlin; Mark Morriss; Scott Morriss
- Producer: Hugh Jones

The Bluetones singles chronology
"Cut Some Rug/Castle Rock" (1996)	"Marblehead Johnson" (1996)	"Solomon Bites the Worm" (1998)

"Marblehead Johnson" is a song by English indie rock band the Bluetones, released as a standalone single in 1996. It peaked at number seven on the UK Singles Chart in late September 1996. It was also included on the band's 2006 compilation, A Rough Outline: The Singles & B-Sides 95 – 03. The song was primarily written by the bassist, Scott Morriss, as a tribute to Bill Hicks.

== Music video ==
The members of the Bluetones spent the day wearing full prosthetic fat suits. The usually skinny guys carry on regular band activities like rocking out, having a kick-around, going for a drive, walking, making tea etc., but now as four hundred pound men. Frontman Mark Morriss said their drummer Eds Chesters got the idea for the video while driving to play a gig in Ireland with Radiohead, suggesting it would be funny to apply the idea of a French and Saunders sketch where the two comediennes play big fat men, to a promotional video.

Mark sports a Liverpool Football Club jersey over his padded fat suit. As well as donning the suits and masks, the boys also wore slip-on rubber fat hands to complete the illusion of them being overweight. Eds and Adam's suits also came with rubber man boobs and fat bellies that can only be seen briefly in the making-of featurette.

Dom and Nic, who were responsible for the Bluetones' "Bluetonic" promo, also directed this video.

== Track listings ==
UK CD single

1. "Marblehead Johnson"
2. "The Simple Things"
3. "Nifkin's Bridge"
4. "Are You Blue or Are You Blind?" (not listed on artwork or disc)

UK 7-inch and cassette single

1. "Marblehead Johnson"
2. "The Simple Things"

Japanese CD single

1. "Marblehead Johnson"
2. "The Simple Things"
3. "Nifkin's Bridge"

== Charts ==
Chart (1996)	Peak position
Europe (Eurochart Hot 100)	39
Scotland Singles (OCC)	4
UK Singles (OCC)	7
UK Indie (Music Week)	11

== Release history ==
Region	Date	Format(s)	Label(s)	Ref.
United Kingdom	16 September 1996	7-inch vinyl; CD; cassette	Superior Quality	
Japan	11 November 1996	CD	A&M	
