= Return to the Last Chance Saloon =

1998 studio album by the Bluetones

Studio album by the Bluetones
- Released: 9 March 1998
- Recorded: December 1996; Summer – autumn 1997
- Studios: Rockfield (Monmouthshire, Wales)
- Genres: Britpop; indie pop; alternative rock
- Length: 1:05:07
- Labels: A&M; Superior Quality
- Producer: Hugh Jones

The Bluetones chronology
Expecting to Fly (1996)	Return to the Last Chance Saloon (1998)	Science & Nature (2000)

Singles from Return to the Last Chance Saloon
- 1. "Solomon Bites the Worm" Released: 9 February 1998; 2. "If..." Released: 27 April 1998; 3. "Sleazy Bed Track" Released: 27 July 1998; 4. "4-Day Weekend" Released: 9 November 1998

Return to the Last Chance Saloon is the second studio album by the English indie rock band the Bluetones, released on 9 March 1998 by A&M Records under the band's sublabel Superior Quality Recordings. Produced by Hugh Jones, the album reached number 10 on the UK Albums Chart. Its singles were "Solomon Bites the Worm", "If...", "Sleazy Bed Track" and "4-Day Weekend", which was only available through mail order and at gigs after A&M were integrated to Universal Music Group.

== Background and recording ==
In September 1996, the Bluetones released their stand-alone single "Marblehead Johnson" to bridge the gap between albums, being aware that they could not produce an entire album on their tour bus. Since they were busy throughout the year, it was "pretty much written in sound checks" while touring Japan.

In December 1996, the band had returned to London after spending the year touring their debut album, Expecting to Fly. Whilst in his shared house in South Wimbledon, their guitarist, Adam Devlin sat on his bedroom floor with a Yamaha iX 4-track, recording parts of partially written songs and ideas for around two weeks. Little came out of that time period apart from "Sleazy Bed Track", "Tone Blooze" and the album's hidden track "A Woman Gone Done Left Me", which was released as its 4-track recording.

To help the band adapt their new song concepts, their record label, A&M Records hired them a rehearsal facility in Bletchingley, Surrey, for a few weeks, called The House In The Woods. In the first session while there, they came up with "Sleazy Bed Track", "Solomon Bites the Worm" and "Sky Will Fall." The band played "Sleazy Bed Track" live for the first time on 11 December 1996 at the Roundhouse, Chalk Farm. Their lead singer, Mark Morriss introduced it by saying "For something old, this is quite a new song."

Upon arrival to Rockfield Studios in Monmouthshire, Wales, the band had picked up their pace with writing songs. The last song they demoed there was "If...". After leaving the studio, all songs were written but remained mostly nameless. Allegedly, the band lost the master tapes of the complete album on a train from Wales, furthering the slow process of its release.

Regarding the album's title, artwork, and overall theme, Morriss said "we settled on the Last Chance Saloon thing because, when we were in the studio, we were kind of... you know, you do get very secluded and you create your own little existences where... and we kind of fantasised that we were gun slingers for about six months." The band also said that it was inspired from the tequila they were drinking while recording.

When asked about being "forgotten" after a year off, Devlin said "Well, it is a bit worrying. We've had no press for a year and it's been a long time. But we've come back with a good album, and if everyone else has half as much faith in it as we do, then we'll be OK."

The working titles of the opening tracks, "Tone Blooze" and "Unpainted Arizona", were "The Godfather I" and "The Godfather II", after the 1970s Francis Ford Coppola films The Godfather and its sequel The Godfather II. They used these names when playing them at V Festival in 1999. During the LP's production, the band nicknamed it as "Album Schmalbum" before thinking of a real title for it.

== Production and musical style ==
Return to the Last Chance Saloon was recorded at Rockfield Studios in Monmouthshire, Wales, during the summer and autumn of 1997. It was produced and mixed by Hugh Jones and was engineered by Phil Auty. As well as this, Jones is credited for performing handclaps, providing backing vocals, playing piano, Hammond organ and mellotron.

In terms of the songwriting, Morriss shared in an interview from August 1998 that he thought "There's a bit more intelligence in the lyrics too, a bit more thought going into it", and while they were a pop group, the band were more than a "straightforward, tidy, little guitar band."

"We threw in the kitchen sink. We wanted to change the sonics on this album, the way we recorded the bass and drums. I think it's more chaotic than Expecting to Fly. It has it mellow moments, but I think the highs are higher and the lows are lower."

— Mark Morriss, Uncut, 1998

The band tried a different approach for the album compared to their 1996 debut, Expecting to Fly, aiming to break away from the jangly sound they were currently known for. Morriss said they wanted to prove themselves by making one big "ambitious"-sounding record, although mentioned even when making it he thought the album was too long and that it could lose around three songs. Another goal they attempted was giving it a "melancholy" sound, aiming to contrast the "bright and breezy pop music" and the "heavy and in your face."

The record used Gretsch and Telecaster electric guitars, and Vox AC30 amplifiers, whereas Expecting to Fly used Rickenbackers and many reverb techniques. The alarms in "U.T.A." are sampled from Star Trek, the beginning of "The Jub-Jub Bird" samples an unspecified Bill Hicks song, and the lyrics for "If..." are partly from Glen Campbell's 1968 single "Wichita Lineman". Devlin stated that "Sky Will Fall" was country-influenced, as well as his favourite track from the album.

Morriss cited the exact moment he found inspiration for Return to the Last Chance Saloon as watching the rock band Jack at a gig as they "blew him away." At the time, he was contemplating his "own navel" and saw its simplicity through the performance. He told Melody Maker that around this time "Adam, Scott and Eds were busy thrashing out their own ideas in the rehearsal room. They'd eventually get fed up and end up playing Jackson Five numbers."

== Release and promotion ==
After charting at number 10 on the UK Singles Chart, a live performance of "Solomon Bites the Worm" was broadcast on Top of the Pops in February 1998. Additionally, another live performance of "If...", which peaked at number 13 on the chart, was featured on TFI Friday in April 1997. By this point, Morriss had developed a throat infection, which led to them having to cancel several tour dates.

NME's Mark Beaumont wrote in November 1998 "A few months ago the Bluetones released a single called 'Sleazy Bed Track'. You may not have noticed. The Bluetones certainly didn't", sarcastically pointing out the band received much less commercial attention at the time of A&M's departure.

== Critical reception ==
Professional ratings
Review scores
Source	Rating
AllMusic	3/5 stars
NME	6/10 stars
The Press and Journal	3.5/5 stars
Select	3.5/5 stars
The Sunday Telegraph	3/5 stars
The Independent	4/5 stars
Uncut	3/5 stars

Johnny Cigarettes of NME wrote that "at its best this is a very fine record by a band who still frequently promise greatness." However, he also stated "The trouble with the Bluetones, you are tempted to conclude after a while, is that they are so easy to like, always demand your respect, and invariably sustain your interest. But you can't imagine ever loving them."

James Delingpole of Q magazine said that the album was a "make-or-break affair", referring to the band as a "dreary four-piece with a wimpy-voiced singer who sang not-very-good songs far too quietly." Despite the harsh criticism, he found it "pretty impressive" at times, praising Devlin's guitar work, comparing it to the Smiths, Led Zeppelin, and Radiohead. Delingpole claimed that the "letdown is singer Mark Morriss, whose voice sounds fine when it's distorted or drowned out on the full-on, rock-out tracks like Solomon Bites the Worm, but unbearably whiny on the slow, sensitive numbers."

The Sunday Telegraph's Anthony Thornton generally complimented the record and the band, although said "What it lacks, however, is a pop gem as immediate and catchy as Slight Return." Melissa Gunn wrote that "What is so special about this album is the pure quality of it", citing "If..." as an example as a song that "displays the true brilliance" of the group, containing "unique lyrics and fantastic background accompaniment."

In her review of several pop albums, Angela Lewis of The Independent stated that "If with debut album Expecting to Fly they were optimistic freshers, this is their triumphant graduation ceremony." Uncut's Dave Simpson wrote that "they've been away for just long enough since to warrant fears of a pre-Second Coming band breakdown. But no. They've ridden back into poptown with a fine album."

== Commercial performance ==
Commercially, Return to the Last Chance Saloon had a noticeably lower performance compared to what Expecting to Fly had achieved, selling 100,000 copies in the UK as opposed to 300,000. Despite this, it still entered the UK top 10. On 6 March 1998, it was certified Silver by the British Phonographic Industry (BPI). Later, on 7 May 1998, it became certified Gold.

== Legacy ==
While reflecting on the album, Morriss referred to it as the only "miss-step" in the band's career for its lengthy duration and the amount of time it took to make. Devlin, however, considered it as one of his favourites, saying it was likely the most fun he had creating a record.

In March 2023, the band announced on Facebook an October tour of fifteen dates in England and one in Scotland, celebrating the twenty-fifth release anniversary of Return to the Last Chance Saloon by playing it in its entirety for the first time.

== Track listing ==
All tracks were written by Mark Morriss, Eds Chesters, Adam Devlin and Scott Morriss.

No.	Title	Length
1.	"Tone Blooze"	2:27
2.	"Unpainted Arizona"	3:09
3.	"Solomon Bites the Worm"	3:09
4.	"U.T.A."	4:04
5.	"4-Day Weekend"	3:57
6.	"Sleazy Bed Track"	4:41
7.	"If..."	5:12
8.	"The Jub-Jub Bird"	4:26
9.	"Sky Will Fall"	3:16
10.	"Ames"	4:44
11.	"Down at the Reservoir"	3:19
12.	"Heard You Were Dead"	4:04
13.	"Broken Starr" (track finishes at 6:05 and stays silent between this time and 13:05)	15:52
14.	"A Woman Gone Done Left Me" (hidden track that starts at 13:05 and ends at 15:52)	2:47
Total length:		1:05:07

== Personnel ==
Personnel per booklet.

The Bluetones

- Mark Morriss – vocals, backing vocals, harmonica, vocoder, handclaps, mellotron, drum machine
- Adam Devlin – guitar, banjo, piano, handclaps, mandolin, E-bow, mellotron, backing vocals
- Scott Morriss – bass, backing vocals, Moog synthesiser, percussion, handclaps, alarm clock
- Eds Chesters – drums, percussion, coconut percussion, marimba, tubular bells, timpani, piano, handclaps, backing vocals, whistling

Additional musicians

- Hugh Jones – piano, handclaps, Hammond organ, mellotron, backing vocals

Production

- Hugh Jones – producer, mixing
- Phil Auty – mix engineer
- Neil Burrow – management
- Julian Able – management
- Scott Morriss – painting

== Charts ==
Weekly chart

Chart (1998)	Peak position
UK Albums (Official Charts)	10

Singles

Single	Chart (1998)	Peak position
"Solomon Bites the Worm"	UK Singles (Official Charts)	10
"If..."	UK Singles (Official Charts)	13
"Sleazy Bed Track"	UK Singles (Official Charts)	35
