= Slight Return =

1996 single by the Bluetones

Single by the Bluetones

from the album Expecting to Fly
- B-side: "The Fountainhead"
- Released: February 1995
- Genre: Britpop; jangle pop
- Length: 3:14
- Label: Superior Quality
- Songwriters: Mark Morriss; Adam Devlin; Scott Morriss; Eds Chesters

The Bluetones singles chronology
"Slight Return" (1995)	"Are You Blue or Are You Blind?" (1995)

"Slight Return"
- Cover art featuring a bombus lucorum bee

Single by the Bluetones

from the album Expecting to Fly
- B-side: "Don't Stand Me Down"; "Nae Hair On't"
- Released: 22 January 1996
- Recorded: Mid-1995
- Studio: Ridge Farm (Surrey, England)
- Genre: Britpop; jangle pop
- Length: 3:21
- Label: A&M; Superior Quality
- Songwriters: Mark Morriss; Adam Devlin; Scott Morriss; Eds Chesters
- Producers: Hugh Jones; Steve Harris; The Bluetones

The Bluetones singles chronology
"Bluetonic" (1995)	"Slight Return" (1996)	"Cut Some Rug" / "Castle Rock" (1996)

Music video
- "Slight Return" on YouTube

"Slight Return" is a song by the English indie rock band the Bluetones, released as their first single in February 1995, on 7-inch blue vinyl, available for their early fans through mail order and at their tour with the rock band Supergrass. Its B-side is "The Fountainhead", which was later included on their debut album Expecting to Fly (1996). Limited to 2000 copies, the single was named after the subtitle for Jimi Hendrix's "Voodoo Child (Slight Return)" as a working title until Bluetones frontman, Mark Morriss, struggled to find another name for it.

"Slight Return" was then reissued on 22 January 1996 as the second single from Expecting to Fly. It peaked at number two on the UK Singles Chart and is the band's highest-placing single. There is a hidden lyric at the 1:47 mark of the song where Morriss says, "Make it funky now!", telling BBC Radio 1's Evening Session that he did not think anyone would notice it. Occasionally, he sings the lyric live.

== Background and recording ==
After the band left a previous local Hounslow group they were in called the Bottlegarden, they reformed as the Bluetones in 1993, working as a three-piece temporarily without a drummer before meeting Eds Chesters. "Slight Return" was the fourth or fifth song they wrote in this time, while they were in their earlier twenties. Their bassist, Scott Morriss wrote its chord progression and structure without words or a melody. Their guitarist, Adam Devllin worked around the guitar parts, adding a solo, and Mark Morriss came up with the vocals. Together, they worked on the instrumental at the end which originally sampled Tom Courtenay in the 1963 comedy drama film Billy Liar.

At first, it worked well at early shows, leading them to release the 7-inch, which was a demo recording. This version of the track was archived on the band's 2007 compilation album, The Early Garage Years. After the band's reformation in April 2015 after their initial 2011 split, they reissued the single for a second time on Acid Jazz Records as part of their Jukebox Tour. Its reissue featured the demo track along with the demo for their 1995 single "Bluetonic", which originally appeared on Fierce Panda Records' 1994 EP compilation, Return To Splendour.

After getting signed to A&M Records and finishing the recording of the album after five or six weeks at Ridge Farm Studio, the label suggested the song to be released as the second single from Expecting to Fly. The band themself were reluctant to this idea since they felt that it would be "short-changing" their fanbase who bought it while they were starting out. They were planning on making the second single "Carnt Be Trusted" instead, which was rejected for not having a chorus. The label also recommended changing the title since it is never explicitly said in the lyrics, although they rejected this since it is referenced in the closing lines "I'm coming home/But just for a short while".

Morriss has revealed that the song's meaning is about somebody who feels cut-off from the world, their friends and their loved-ones.

== Release and reception ==
"Slight Return" was re-released in January 1996 as the band's third single, less than a month before the release of their debut album, Expecting to Fly. It entered the midweek UK Singles Chart at number two, beneath Babylon Zoo's "Spaceman" which gained significant exposure after appearing in a television advertisement for Levi's jeans. The band were at an airport flying to a press junket when their former manager received a message on his pager saying "Call the label." Mark Morriss said he could not believe its chart position until he got to their hotel and found out it was selling by the truckload. Adam Devlin however found out when he was at a laundrette since his shared house in Wimbledon he was living in at the time did not have a washing machine. He was called by their manager and informed it had reached number two.

NME praised the song, giving it Single of the Week, writing that the band's "knack of articulating a mood of hand-wringing melancholia reaches new peaks" with the release of the single which is "all filtered through Mark Morriss' peculiarly tuneful whine of a vocal." They also noted their appeal to its first B-side, "Don't Stand Me Down", stating that they "dare to merge such darkly contrasting emotions against a gorgeous rolling blues." Everett True of Melody Maker wrote that the track creates incandescent beauty in his review of Expecting to Fly. Lily Moayeri of MTV Online compared their music to the sound of a Manchester band as opposed to a band from London. She acknowledged that they were frequently linked to the Stone Roses and rather said that, "if you liked the Stone Roses, you will probably like the Bluetones."

Upon the single's release, it featured on several music programmes such as Top of the Pops, The Chart Show, Later... with Jools Holland, and previously The White Room as their television debut before signing to A&M Records.

The song is generally remembered and associated as a jangly track at the height of the Bluetones' career during the Britpop movement. It was referred to as a "chirpy jangle" by Select.

== Single cover ==
The song's single cover depicts a bombus lucorum bee, as a nod to the logo of the association football team Adam Devlin supports, Brentford F.C.

== Music video ==
Morriss has stated that the concept for the song's promotional video was initially inspired by the 1962 coming-of-age film, The Loneliness of the Long Distance Runner, combined with the idea of indulgence, where the band would portray marathon runners, and towards the end there would be long tables of food like cakes and burgers, instead of water. It was filmed at the Royal Arsenal Gatehouse and its surrounding areas in Woolwich in south-east London and was directed by Lindy Heymann. The video was included on both the band's November 1997 Mondo Concerto VHS and DVD release and their October 2007 Blue Movies DVD.

== Track listings ==
All tracks were written by Mark Morriss, Adam Devlin, Scott Morriss, and Eds Chesters.

UK limited-edition blue vinyl 7-inch single (1995)

A. "Slight Return"
B. "The Fountainhead"

UK 7-inch and cassette single; European CD single (1996)

1. "Slight Return"
2. "Don't Stand Me Down"

UK, Australian, and Japanese CD single (1996)

1. "Slight Return"
2. "Don't Stand Me Down"
3. "Nae Hair On't"

US CD single (1996)

1. "Slight Return"
2. "Don't Stand Me Down"
3. "Nae Hair On't"
4. "Are You Blue or Are You Blind?"

UK 7-inch single (2015)

A. "Slight Return" (demo)
B. "No. 11" (demo)

== Credits and personnel ==
Credits are taken from the Expecting to Fly album booklet and CD single notes.

Studio

- Recorded in mid-1995 at Ridge Farm Studios (Surrey, England)

The Bluetones

- Mark Morriss – writing, vocals
- Adam Devlin – writing, six-string guitar, twelve-string guitar
- Scott Morriss – writing, backing vocals, electric bass guitar
- Eds Chesters – writing, drums, percussion

Additional personnel

- Hugh Jones – production, mixing
- Steve Harris – co-production
- The Bluetones – co-production
- Helen Woodward – mix engineering
- Geoff Pesche – mastering
- Trevor Ray Hart – photography

== Charts ==
=== Weekly charts ===
Chart (1996)	Peak position
Australia (ARIA)	60
Europe (Eurochart Hot 100)	13
Finland (Suomen virallinen lista)	19
Iceland (Íslenski Listinn Topp 40)	5
Ireland (IRMA)	15
Scottish Singles Sales (Official Charts)	3
Sweden (Sverigetopplistan)	52
UK Singles (Official Charts)	2
UK Indie (Music Week)	1

=== Year-end charts ===
Chart (1996)	Position
Iceland (Íslenski Listinn Topp 40)	49
UK Singles (OCC)	59
UK Airplay (Music Week)	15

== Certifications ==
Region	Certification	Certified units/sales
United Kingdom (BPI)	Silver	200,000^{^}
^{^} Shipments figures based on certification alone.

== Release history ==
Region	Date	Format(s)	Label(s)	Ref.
United Kingdom	February 1995	7-inch vinyl	Superior Quality	
United Kingdom	22 January 1996	7-inch vinyl; CD; cassette	Superior Quality	
Japan	25 February 1996	CD	A&M	
