= Fatsuit =

Bodysuit to fatten an actor's appearance

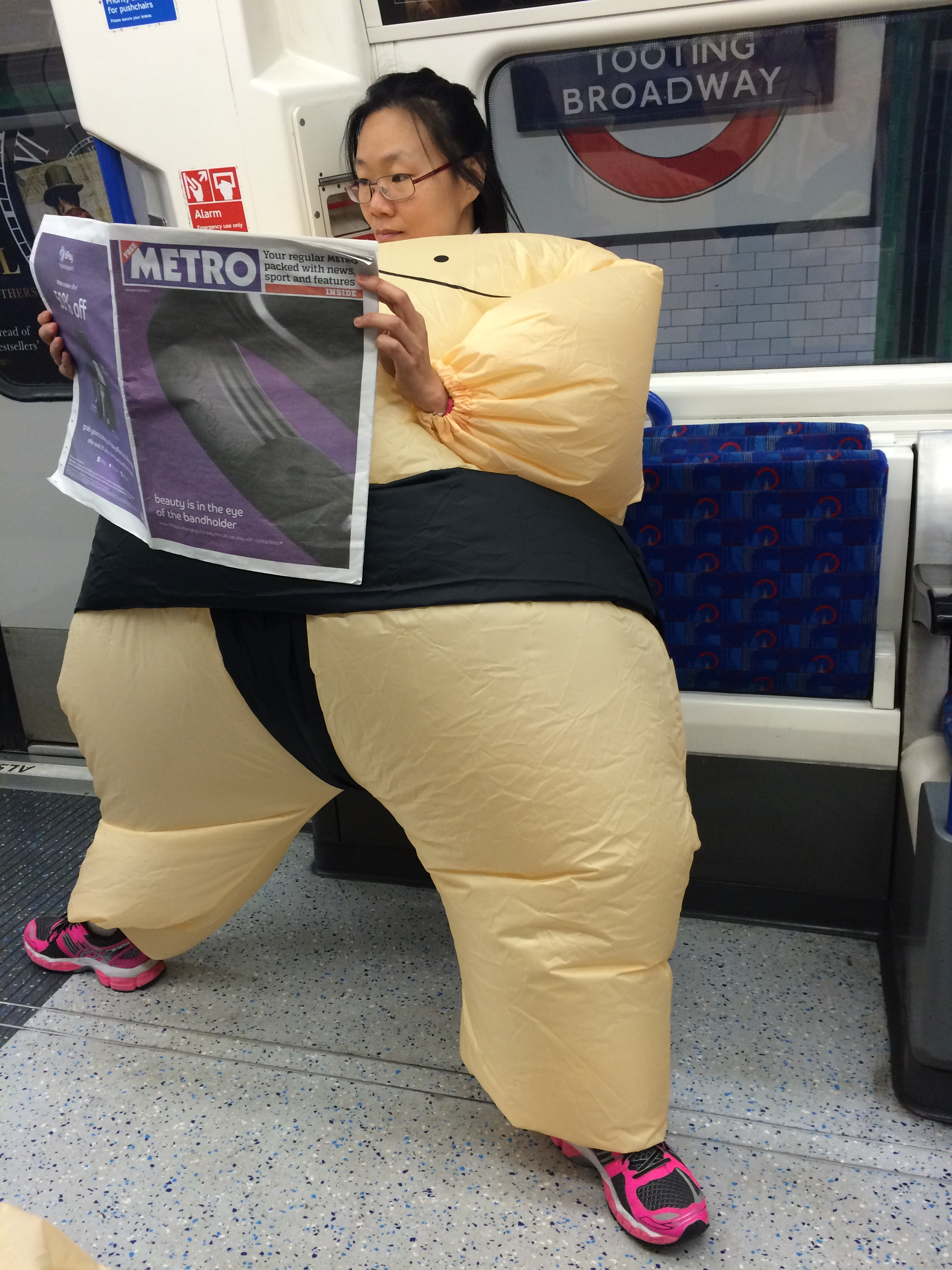
A fatsuit being worn in London

A fatsuit, also known as a fat suit or a fat-suit, is a bodysuit-like undergarment used to thicken the appearance of an actor or actress of light to medium build into an overweight or obese character, in conjunction with prosthetic makeup. Fatsuits worn by characters are either deliberately visible or mainly concealed. Most are intended as unseen body padding beneath a costume (e.g., Rosemary Shanahan in Shallow Hal, and Sherman Klump in The Nutty Professor), others appear as realistic flesh and are viewed directly (e.g., Fat Bastard in Austin Powers, and Les Grossman's hands in Tropic Thunder). A fatsuit is often used to provide comedic effect, as in music videos for "Fat" by "Weird Al" Yankovic, "Marblehead Johnson" by The Bluetones, "Keine Lust" by Rammstein and "Way 2 Sexy" by Drake, and the episode "The Cooper Extraction" of The Big Bang Theory.

== Experience of obesity ==
Fatsuits may also be used to impart the experience of being obese to the wearer, not just the appearance of obesity to their audience. The suit in this case is weighted, as well as padded. Where the intention is to impart the experience of being seen as overweight in a community, its appearance must also be realistic and so a fatsuit rather than just a weight belt is needed. Several celebrities noted for their slimness have worn such garments and recorded their, and others', reactions as documentary of social attitudes to weight.

== See also ==
- Bodysuit
- Prosthetic makeup
