= West Thames College =

Coordinates: 51.4753°N 0.3423°W

Location
- London Road, TW7 4HS; Isleworth, Greater London; England

Information
- Type: Further and Higher Education College
- Established: 1976 (as Hounslow Borough College)
- Ofsted: Reports
- Gender: Mixed
- Enrollment: 5,200+ (2014)
- Website: http://www.west-thames.ac.uk/

West Thames College is a medium-sized college of further and higher education in West London, England. It was formed in 1976, originally named Hounslow Borough College, having gained its current name in 1993. The college has two campuses in the London Borough of Hounslow: a main campus in Isleworth and a smaller Skills Centre in Feltham. As of 2014 there were over 5,200 enrolled students at the college. The college offers a wide range of A Levels and specialist vocational courses up to higher education level: BTECs, NVQs, City & Guilds, Foundation Degrees and HNDs.

== Isleworth Campus ==
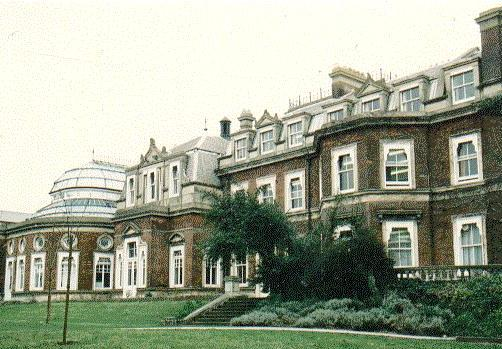
Spring Grove House (formerly Pears House) in 1988

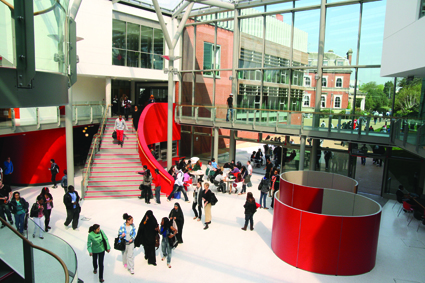
West Thames College Atrium building in 2010

The main college campus in Isleworth includes the Grade II listed Spring Grove House – once the home of 18th century botanist and explorer Sir Joseph Banks – and modern buildings such as the Millennium Building (built 1999, refurbished 2008 and extended 2010), the Atrium Building (opened 2010) and the Sir Joseph Banks Building (opened 2011).

Facilities include the new 140-seat Endeavour Theatre; performance, dance and rehearsal studios; a professional Media and Music Centre with TV studio, recording and editing suites; hair and beauty salons which are open to the public; specialist makeup studios; sports and fitness centre with full-sized sports hall, gym and outdoor pitches; art and design studios; a Learning Resource Centre on three storeys with drop-in IT suites and extensive library; engineering workshops and science laboratories. There are also modern leisure facilities for students including spacious common rooms and cafes.

== Feltham Campus ==
The Feltham Skills Centre was officially opened in 2003 by future Prime Minister Gordon Brown, then Chancellor of the Exchequer. Around 650 students study practical vocational skills and training at the Skills Centre, including catering, plumbing, brickwork, painting and decorating, electrical installation, engineering, carpentry and motor vehicle maintenance.

== History ==
Spring Grove House, a Grade II listed building which forms part of the college's Isleworth campus, was the main country residence of Sir Joseph Banks from 1779 to his death in 1820 (he purchased the freehold in 1808). Banks carried out scientific experiments in the grounds of the house and Queen Charlotte visited Banks and his wife there in 1813.

The first recorded house on the site was built around 1645. Elisha Biscoe bought this house in 1754, demolished it and built Spring Grove House. After Biscoe's death, his son leased the house to Banks.

Spring Grove House was substantially rebuilt and extended by its later owners, Henry Pownall in the mid 19th century and Andrew Pears in the late 19th century. It is an excellent example of late Victorian architecture and interior design, with a fine Georgian room as an added bonus. The ground floor rooms of the building were sensitively restored and redecorated in 2011.

In 1922 the house was purchased by Middlesex County Council. It opened in that year as the new site of Hounslow Polytechnic (renamed Spring Grove Polytechnic) which had been established in 1892 and had used premises in Hanworth Road. The following year Spring Grove Secondary School moved to the house, sharing the building with the Polytechnic who offered almost entirely evening classes.

In 1946 Spring Grove Secondary School became Spring Grove Grammar School. It moved to new premises in Lampton in 1959 and Spring Grove House was taken over by Isleworth Polytechnic as a full-time college. Following the merger of Isleworth and Chiswick polytechnics, the college became Hounslow Borough College in 1976. In 1993 the college acquired incorporated status and was renamed West Thames College.

Spring Grove House is open to the public one Saturday every September as part of Open House London.

== Honours ==
West Thames College also gained national Beacon Awards for Equality and Diversity in 2008 and 2009.

The college has a reputation for its creative arts courses, especially specialist makeup. Students have won the International Makeup Artist Trade Show (IMATS) 5 times.

== Notable alumni ==
- Celena Cherry, lead singer with Honeyz
- Anne-Marie Duff, actress (Shameless, Nowhere Boy, The Virgin Queen)
- Martin Hancock, actor (Defiance, Coronation Street, Holby City)
- Freddie Mercury, lead vocalist of Queen, studied at the college when it was known as Isleworth Polytechnic
- Mark Morriss and Scott Morriss of the Bluetones
- Rufus Sewell, actor (Zen, Pillars of the Earth)
