= A New Athens (album) =

Studio album by The Bluetones
- Released: 31 May 2010
- Recorded: 2009–2010
- Studio: Green Lane
- Genres: Indie pop, indie rock
- Length: 48:06
- Label: CIA
- Producer: Gordon Mills Jr.

The Bluetones chronology
The Bluetones (2006)	A New Athens (2010)	Drive Thru EP (2024)

Singles from A New Athens
- 1. "Carry Me Home" Released: 13 June 2010; 2. "Golden Soul" Released: 14 November 2010

Professional ratings
Review scores
Source	Rating
AllMusic	3/5 stars
Herald Scotland	(favorable)
inthenews.co.uk	7/10 stars
PopMatters	7/10 stars
Slant Magazine	3/5 stars
WalesOnline	7/10

A New Athens is the sixth studio album by English indie rock band the Bluetones. It was released on 31 May 2010 on CIA Recordings. It failed to chart in the Top 200 UK Albums Chart after its first week on release.

Its first single was "Carry Me Home", released on 13 June 2010, on download. A second single, "Golden Soul", was released on 14 November 2010, on download.

In June 2021, a deluxe edition of the album featuring exclusive material was released on limited edition heavyweight blue vinyl on Demon Records for Record Store Day 2021.

== Track listing ==
All tracks written by: Chesters, Devlin, Morriss, Morriss:

1. "The Notes Between the Notes Between the Notes"
2. "Firefly"
3. "A New Athens"
4. "Culling Song"
5. "Into The Red"
6. "Golden Soul"
7. "The Day That Never Was"
8. "Carry Me Home"
9. "Half the Size of Nothing"
10. "Haunted by You"
11. "Pranchestonelle"
12. "Hey Schmoopy" (hidden track)

== Personnel ==
The Bluetones

- Adam Devlin – guitar
- Eds Chesters – drums
- Mark Morriss – vocals
- Scott Morriss – bass

Additional musicians

- Alex-Lee Richards – keyboards
- Andy Lewis - cello
- Matt Berry - backing vocals
- Imogen Andrews - backing vocals

Production

- Gordon Mills Jr.

Design

- David Fawcett - painting

== Production ==
The record was recorded at Green Lane Studio and was engineered by Gordon Mills in his sister's home studio in her back garden in Chertsey, Surrey. The guitarist, Adam Devlin noted that the recording process was more enjoyable than some of the recording of some of their other albums and made it for their own entertainment without worrying about how well it performed. He also said that it was likely the least amount of money he spent on recording an album. The lead singer, Mark Morriss cited the record as his favourite they had made as a band and was disappointed by its reception.
