= Science & Nature (The Bluetones album) =

2000 studio album by the Bluetones

Studio album by the Bluetones
- Released: 15 May 2000
- Recorded: Summer 1999
- Studios: Sawmills (Cornwall, England)
- Genres: Rock; indie rock; alternative rock
- Length: 45:15
- Labels: Mercury; Superior Quality
- Producer: John Cornfield

The Bluetones chronology
Return to the Last Chance Saloon (1998)	Science & Nature (2000)	Luxembourg (2003)

Singles from Science & Nature
- 1. "Keep the Home Fires Burning" Released: 21 February 2000; 2. "Autophilia (or How I Learned to Stop Worrying and Love My Car)" Released: 8 May 2000

Professional ratings
Review scores
Source	Rating
AllMusic	3/5 stars
Dotmusic	7/10 stars
NME	7/10 stars
Q	4/5 stars
The Guardian	3/5 stars

Science & Nature is the third studio album by the English indie rock band the Bluetones, released on 15 May 2000 by Mercury Records. Produced by John Cornfield, it was the band's first album that their keyboardist Richard Payne played on. It spawned the hit singles "Keep the Home Fires Burning" and "Autophilia (or How I Learned to Stop Worrying and Love My Car)". The album itself peaked at number 7 on the UK Albums Chart. "Mudslide" was released as an EP in October 2000.

In 2019, the LP was reissued on 180g translucent vinyl for the first time through Demon Music Group, alongside the heavyweight blue vinyl reissue of their following 2002 greatest hits compilation, The Singles, which had never been released on vinyl until then.

== Production ==
Science & Nature was recorded over the course of nine weeks at Sawmills Studios in Golant, Cornwall during the summer of 1999. In their first rehearsal session, the band recorded three songs with former Orange Juice lead singer Edwyn Collins – "Tiger Lily", "Autophilia (or How I Learned to Stop Worrying and Love My Car)", and "One Speed Gearbox". According to their frontman, Mark Morriss, they came out sounding "plain awful", which led them to think they had lost their "mojo" but realised it was their choice of producer. At the time, Collins had been heavily drinking and was focussed on his Channel 4 sitcom, West Heath Yard. Since time was running out for the album's production, the band decided to find a new producer.

The band enjoyed Supergrass' eponymous album and so got in touch with their current producer, John Cornfield. They said they could have recorded the album within around three weeks but decided to spend more time enjoying the process as their budget could allow it. "The Last of the Great Navigators" started off as an instrumental until Morriss wrote its lyrics after floating in a boat at night.

== Reception ==
Iain Forrester of Stylus Magazine stated that Science & Nature "abandons the sound they stuck to rigidly elsewhere," and "while being successfully aware of their limitations throws everything they can think of (country, jazz, folk, prog) at melodic pop." He called it "inventive and gently surprising." Drowned in Sound's Thomas Blatchford briefly reflected on the record in a later review, saying that it contained "invention and refined sensibility."

Jason Damas of AllMusic felt that the album was largely not as new wave-influenced as many suggested prior to release, except on "Mudslide", but did find the album to contain "a bit more of a pop leaning." Dotmusic's Jackie Flynn argued that "if the Bluetones didn't exist then there'd be no real need to invent them. All they do is make pleasantly satisfying records and unfortunately that's not really enough these days." John Harris of Q magazine praised the album and rated it highly, with a reputation of previously strongly criticising the band's material. Caroline Sullivan of The Guardian wrote that "Mark Morriss's plaintive voice breathes life into fragile love songs and moshpit rockers, complemented by Adam Devlin's liquid guitar shape, for the sunniest record this spring."

== Track listing ==
All tracks were written by Mark Morriss, Adam Devlin, Scott Morriss, Eds Chesters, and Richard Payne.

No.	Title	Length
1.	"Zorrro"	3:39
2.	"The Last of the Great Navigators"	3:48
3.	"Tiger Lily"	3:25
4.	"Mudslide"	4:21
5.	"One Speed Gearbox"	3:46
6.	"Blood Bubble"	3:33
7.	"Autophilia (or How I Learned to Stop Worrying and Love My Car)"	4:59
8.	"Keep the Home Fires Burning"	3:27
9.	"The Basement Song"	5:14
10.	"Slack Jaw"	2:59
11.	"Emily's Pine"	6:03
12.	"It's a Boy" (Japanese bonus track)	1:34
Total length:		45:15

== Personnel ==
Credits are taken from the Science & Nature CD album notes.

The Bluetones

- Mark Morriss – vocals, guitar
- Adam Devlin – guitar
- Scott Morriss – bass guitar, backing vocals
- Eds Chesters – drums

Additional musicians

- Richard Payne – keys
- Robin Hopcraft – trumpet (track 1)
- Melvin Duffy – pedal steel guitar (track 5)
- Bob Peters – conductor, copyist (track 7)
- John Hutchens – euphonium (track 7)
- Chris Leonard – flugelhorn (track 7)
- Monty Ray – flugelhorn (track 7)
- Sky Murphy – trombone (track 7)
- Therese Shepherd – tuba (track 7)

Production

- John Cornfield – producer
- Neil Burrow – management

Design

- Yacht Associates – design, art direction
- Scott Morriss – art
- Jonathan Shaw – photographer

== Charts ==
Weekly chart

Chart (2000)	Peak position
UK Albums (Official Charts)	7

Singles

Single	Chart (2000)	Peak position
"Keep the Home Fires Burning"	UK Singles (Official Charts)	13
"Autophilia (or How I Learned to Stop Worrying and Love My Car)"	UK Singles (Official Charts)	18
