= Soho (band) =

English musical trio

- Soho (1991)

Background information
- Origin: London and Wolverhampton, England
- Genres: Pop; electronic; trip hop
- Years active: 1988–1999
- Labels: Hedd Records, Savage Records, Atco Records, Rhino Entertainment
- Past members: Jacqueline Cuff; Pauline Cuff; Timothy London; Liam Gillick; Eds Chesters; Leigh Gorman; Barry Smith; Graham Dove; Nigel Lackey

Soho were an English musical trio consisting of identical twin sisters Jacqueline (Jacqui) Cuff and Pauline Cuff with producer Tim London (also known as Timothy Brinkhurst). Other members of the group have included Liam Gillick, Eds Chesters, Leigh Gorman and Barry Smith. Bob and Henry Morris played with the trio when they were known as Groovalax.

== Career ==
Identical twins Jacqui and Pauline Cuff were born 1962 in Wolverhampton, England, and Timothy Brinkhurst was born in 1960. In the early 1980s, when the Cuff sisters were student nurses, they performed together in St Albans, Hertfordshire before meeting Brinkhurst. The trio performed under the names Tim London's Orgasm and Tim London and the Soho Sisters. As Soho, the group recorded three albums for Virgin subsidiary Hedd Records, although only one, Noise, was released.

The group is best known for their hit song "Hippychick" (composed by Brinkhurst and credited to Johnny Marr), which reached #14 on the American Billboard Hot 100 chart hit in December 1990 and #2 on the Billboard Hot Dance Club Play chart. It also became a top-10 hit single on the UK Singles Chart in 1991. The song features a prominent sample from the Smiths' "How Soon Is Now?" sequenced over a contemporary urban rhythm. London told Mojo magazine that it "was written as a blues before the Smiths' samples and the rhythm were added". The single appears on Soho's 1990 album Goddess.

In 1991, Soho recorded a single with Adamski, "Born to Be Alive", which peaked at No. 51 in the UK chart. The song is credited to Soho and Adamski and is not related to the 1979 disco hit. In 1994, Soho signed to Magnet/Warners on the strength of two self-financed albums that were recorded after Savage Records had folded. The LPs, including Oosh (an anagram of "Soho"), remained unreleased until 2008, when Yard was released as a digital download.

During the 1990s, Soho performed a cover version of the Icicle Works hit "Birds Fly (Whisper to a Scream)" for the soundtrack of the film Scream. The track "Nuthin' on My Mind" was featured in the 1991 John Hughes film Career Opportunities. "Hippychick" appeared on the 1990 compilation album Happy Daze.

The band attained some brief press notoriety in 1992 with their track "Claire's Kitchen" (on Thug), which referenced the alleged affair between prime minister John Major and caterer Clare Latimer.

Brinkhurst moved to Edinburgh in the early 2000s. He managed the band Young Fathers, coproducing and cowriting five of their albums.

In 2017, Brinkhurst again teamed again with the Cuff sisters and main vocalist Law Holt in the electronic music collective Iklan, which released Album Number 1 on the Soulpunk label in 2020.

== Discography ==
=== Albums ===
- Noise (1989)
- Goddess (1990) (AUS No. 102)
- Thug (1992)
- Baby Baby Baby Baby (1993)
- Yard (1994)
- Another London (1995)
- Soho – Soho (1996)
- Family BC (1999)

=== Singles ===
List of singles, with selected chart positions
Title	Year	Peak positions							Album
Title	Year	UK	AUS	NED	NZ	US	US Alter	US Dance	Album
"Piece of You"	1988	80	—	—	—	—	—	—	Noise
"You Won't Hold Me Down"	1988	141	—	—	—	—	—	—	Noise
"Message from My Baby"	1989	167	—	—	—	—	—	—	Noise
"Boy"	1989	168	—	—	—	—	—	—	Goddess
"Hippychick"	1990	67	21	62	7	14	11	2	Goddess
"Freaky" (US only)	1991	—	—	—	—	—	—	32	Goddess
"Hippychick" (UK re-release)	1991	8	—	—	—	—	—	—	Goddess
"Love Generation"	1991	85	—	—	—	—	—	—	Goddess
"Out of My Mind"	1991	—	156	—	—	—	—	—	Goddess
"Ride"	1992	—	—	—	—	—	—	—	Thug
"Radio Soul Groove"	1992	—	—	—	—	—	—	—	Thug
"Stupid"	1996	—	—	—	—	—	—	—	Soho Soho
"—" denotes releases that did not chart or were not released.
