= The Bluetones =

English indie rock band

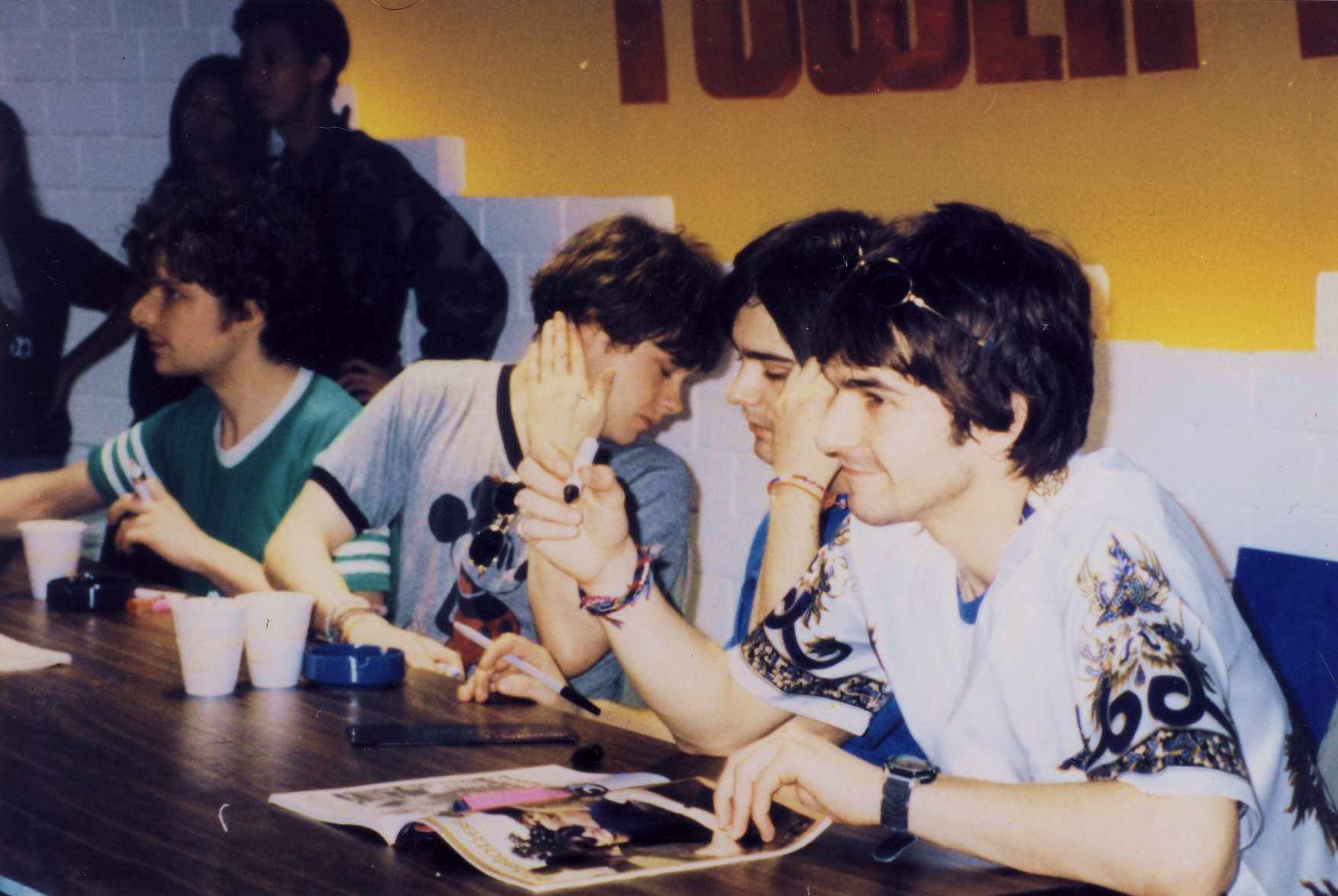
- The Bluetones in 1996

Background information
- Origin: Hounslow, London, England
- Genres: Britpop; indie rock; jangle pop; indie pop
- Years active: 1993–2011, 2015–present
- Labels: Superior Quality; A&M; Mercury; Cooking Vinyl; CIA; Brainhole
- Members: Mark Morriss; Adam Devlin; Scott Morriss; Eds Chesters
- Past members: Richard Payne
- Website: bluetones.band

The Bluetones are an English indie rock band formed in Hounslow, West London, in 1993. They comprise Mark Morriss (vocals), Adam Devlin (guitar), Mark's younger brother Scott Morriss (bass guitar) and Eds Chesters (drums). A fifth member, Richard Payne (keys), came on board between 1998 and 2002, although he still regularly works and tours with the band. Before their official formation, all members, excluding Chesters, were originally in a group called the Bottlegarden.

The band have scored thirteen Top 40 singles and three Top 10 albums on the UK charts. Although their commercial success waned in the post-Britpop era, they continued to tour and release new records. Their most recent album, Atlas, was released in May 2026, just under sixteen years after their previous 2010 album, A New Athens.

== History ==
=== 1989–1994: Formation and early years ===
On 12 April 1989, after going to see the Stone Roses play at the ICA in London after a tube strike, with a friend Robin and an acquaintance Gareth, Mark Morriss was offered to join the Bottlegarden, since they were looking for a bassist and had informed them he recently started playing both bass and electric guitar. After a couple of rehearsals, Morriss decided to bring his brother Scott along to fill in on bass as a stopgap to begin with but eventually joined as he was improving fast, shaping them as a five-piece. They started playing venues in 1990, mainly around Hounslow. Their other guitarist besides Morriss left to go to university soon after this.

Around this time, Morriss moved from his home into a shared house with members from the rock band Dodgy for two years, also meeting the Bluetones guitarist Adam Devlin, who was in a local "scuzzy" indie band called A Perfect Mess. He later left A Perfect Mess to join the Bottlegarden, who were more baggy focussed and Madchester-inspired. Robin, the founding member and lead vocalist, left soon after Devlin joined. Since the remaining four members of the group did not originally own it, they disbanded and reformed as the Bluetones, a name suggested by Devlin. Without a singer, Morriss experimented with vocals initially until they found a new drummer, although ended up becoming the sole singer. Their drummer left just as they started, after the realisation that they were becoming older and making little progress. The three then settled, writing and demoing songs together temporarily without any drums.

They were introduced to their drummer Eds Chesters, who was working with the pop trio Soho at the time, by Dodgy's drummer, Matthew Priest at the Dodgy Club, since they needed a replacement drummer. Chesters attended one of their rehearsal sessions in the garage they used, and listened to the first song they had demoed together, "A Parting Gesture", and decided to join them after hearing it, having previously had doubts about the age gap and musical style between him and Soho. Devlin said in 2015 that when he spent time with Chesters before joining, they "just clicked seamlessly."

The band started playing venues in 1993, mostly at the Red Lion pub in Brentford every few months and at the former venue Bull & Gate in Kentish Town, London. Later, they grew popularity from supporting associated bands such as Supergrass, the Charlatans, Strangelove and Shed Seven.

=== 1995–1996: Breakthrough and Expecting to Fly ===
On 5 June 1995, the band released their debut stand-alone single "Are You Blue or Are You Blind?", on their sublabel Superior Quality Recordings, which reached the lower half of the Top 40 on the UK Singles Chart, peaking at number 31. Despite this, its music video, directed by Thomas Napper, featured on both The Chart Show on and Top of the Pops.

After the release and publication of two singles through Fierce Panda Records, the band signed to A&M Records after a signing battle in 1996, and released Expecting to Fly on 12 February on their Superior Quality imprint. It was named after a single by Buffalo Springfield, one of their biggest influences. The album entered the UK Albums Chart at number 1, knocking Oasis' second studio album (What's the Story) Morning Glory? off that position for a week. Its singles were "Bluetonic", "Slight Return" and "Cut Some Rug", with the latter reaching number 2 on the UK Singles Chart. "Cut Some Rug" was released as a double A-side single, partnered with "Castle Rock". The LP was certified platinum by the British Phonographic Industry (BPI) in March 1998 for sales of 300,000, as well as 82,000 on first-week sales. Following the touring and promotional duties for the album, the band released the stand-alone single "Marblehead Johnson" in September 1996 to bridge the gap between albums.

=== 1997–2002: Return to the Last Chance Saloon and Mercury Records ===
After spending a few weeks rehearsing new material in the studio The House In The Woods in Bletchingley, Surrey, the Bluetones booked Rockfield Studios in Monmouthshire, Wales, to record a second album. The album, Return to the Last Chance Saloon, was released on 9 March 1998. While failing to repeat the commercial success of Expecting to Fly, it reached the top 10 on the UK Albums Chart. Its singles were "Solomon Bites the Worm", "If...", "Sleazy Bed Track" and "4-Day Weekend". The first two singles reached number 10 and 13, respectively, on the UK Singles Chart. The band recruited their keyboardist Richard Payne at a similar time for the promotional duties for Return to the Last Chance Saloon. He became an official member towards the production of their third album.

In 2000, the Bluetones signed to Mercury Records, owned by Universal Music Group, after A&M were sold to a new company, although did not receive the treatment they expected. The band released their third album, Science & Nature, which again reached the top 10 and featured the hit singles "Keep the Home Fires Burning" and "Autophilia (or How I Learned to Stop Worrying and Love My Car)".

In 2002, Mercury suggested releasing a greatest hits compilation after three studio albums. Although the band personally thought they were still at an early stage in their career, they seemed to have little involvement and direction towards it. Because of this, they compromised by writing new material for the album. The album, titled The Singles, was released on 8 April 2002 and featured all of their singles at the time, excluding "Castle Rock", with the addition of four exclusive tracks, a limited-edition second disc and its own single, "After Hours". The Singles received relative praise and was certified Silver by the BPI.

=== 2003–2011: Later career and initial split ===
After a relatively praised response from The Singles, the band left Mercury and released their fourth studio album, Luxembourg, primarily under Superior Quality, to mixed reviews in 2003. It featured the double A-side single "Fast Boy/Liquid Lips" and "Never Going Nowhere", which both charted in the Top 40.

A three-album deal was signed in late 2005 with the Cooking Vinyl record label, promptly followed by the limited EP release Serenity Now and a full UK tour. Named after a reference to the Seinfield episode "The Serenity Now", the EP was independently released by the band through mail order, and was being sold on tour dates.

In early 2006, Universal issued a comprehensive box set of all the Bluetones singles, B-sides and additional bonus tracks released between 1995 and 2003, titled A Rough Outline: The Singles & B-sides 95 - 03.

The single "My Neighbour's House" was released in the UK on 19 September 2006, and was taken from their self-titled album, which was released in October that year. It failed to chart in the UK Albums Chart after its first week on sale. The album was also released in the US, the first such occurrence since their debut. Although no reason was cited at first, on 1 October 2006, it was announced that a planned nine-date tour of North America, Japan and Australia had been scrapped. However, on 1 November 2006, the band began a month-long tour of Europe in support of their new release, including two sold-out nights at Glasgow's King Tut's Wah Wah Hut.

It was later revealed that in September 2006, the band's former tour manager they had since 1994 robbed them of hundreds of thousands of pounds. Since he declared himself bankrupt, he faced no consequences. The band found out after receiving an email the day before they were set to do their nine-date tour. It was cancelled since no money for the flights or hotels had been funded.

The Bluetones performing at Hart Hill Community Centre in 2007

In February 2007, the band released the compilation BBC Radio Sessions containing tracks recorded for BBC sessions between 1994 and 2000. This was followed in June with their first full live album, Once Upon a Time in West Twelve, recorded at the Shepherd's Bush Empire in West London on 18 November 2005, and was followed on 29 October 2007, by a live DVD of the same concert under the title Beat about the Bush. 2007 also saw the release of a compilation album of early demo recordings, titled The Early Garage Years. They also released a DVD under the title Blue Movies, which included their first fifteen promotional music videos with exclusive band commentary and additional commentary from Edgar Wright for the videos he directed, and various Top of the Pops performance archives.

In January 2008, the band began a mini-tour of Scotland, playing the five cities, Stirling, Dunfermline, Aberdeen, Glasgow and Edinburgh, in as many nights. In May 2008, a ten-date tour covered Cambridge, Whitehaven, Sheffield, Newcastle upon Tyne, Birmingham, London, Bristol, Manchester and Darwen, including one of the last few concerts at the Astoria. They also played a gig with Dodgy on 17 May 2009, at a secret London venue, to benefit the homelessness charity Crisis, as part of the charity's 'Hidden Gigs' campaign against hidden homelessness.

In December 2008, the band embarked on a five-date tour, taking place in Lincoln, Manchester, Sheffield and Birmingham. The tour saw them playing their debut album, Expecting to Fly, in full. Some further dates were subsequently announced for February and March 2009. This followed another DVD release by CIA Recordings in May, Expecting to Fly Live, produced and directed by Alan Miles. It featured a recording of them playing the album in full at the Astoria on 18 May as one of the last acts to perform before the venue shut down.

On 31 May 2010, the band released a new album through CIA entitled A New Athens. Despite moderate praise, the album failed to appear on the UK Albums Chart.

The Bluetones performing at Shepherd's Bush Empire in 2011 on their farewell tour

On 28 March 2011, the band announced on their Myspace account they would split after a farewell tour in the following autumn after seventeen years of touring and six studio albums. The tour started on 3 September at The Orange Box, Yeovil, Somerset, and ended on 22 September at the O_{2} Academy Birmingham. For some of these dates, they changed into dressing gowns for a second encore.

On 17 January 2013, Morriss, Devlin and Chesters played a one-off solo show at the Queen of Hoxton as part of Morriss' Pledge campaign which helped fund the production of his second solo studio album, A Flash of Darkness.

=== 2015–present: Reformation and new releases ===
On 13 April 2015, the band announced that they would reform after a mutual agreement for a new UK tour, which coincided with the forthcoming twentieth anniversary of Expecting to Fly's release. Entitled the Jukebox Tour, its dates were between April and May 2016.

In summer 2017, they co-headlined the Star Shaped Festival tour run by the popular Britpop club of the same name alongside the newly reformed Sleeper. This took place in Birmingham, London, Manchester and Glasgow in July and August 2017.

On 6 August 2021, the band released a six-CD box set compilation of all of their releases on Superior Quality from 1994 to 2002 on Edsel Records as well as featuring three previously unreleased demo recordings. Its exclusive release included signed copies and five badges. A year after, on 12 August 2022, they released a follow-up four-CD box set compilation of their releases from 2003 to 2010, featuring two unreleased tracks.

On 1 May 2026, the band released their first album in almost sixteen years entitled Atlas. It was released on their independent label, Brainhole Records and featured all nine tracks from three previous EP releases from 2024 to 2025 along with a bonus track. Although it failed to chart the UK Albums Chart, it reached number 20 on the Scottish Albums Chart.

== Band members ==
=== Current ===
- Mark Morriss – lead vocals (1993–2011, 2015–present)
- Adam Devlin – lead guitar (1993–2011, 2015–present)
- Scott Morriss – bass, backing vocals (1993–2011, 2015–present)
- Eds Chesters – drums, percussion (1993–2011, 2015–present)

=== Touring ===
- Richard Payne – keys (1998–2011, 2015–present)
- Paul Beard – keys (2002–2003)
- Alex Lee-Richards – keys (2008–2018)

=== Former ===
- Richard Payne – keys (1998–2002)

== Discography ==
The Bluetones discography
- Studio albums: 7
- Extended plays: 6
- Live albums: 2
- Compilation albums: 8
- Singles: 22
- B-sides: 38
- Video albums: 4
- Music videos: 20

The discography of the Bluetones, an English indie rock band, consists of seven studio albums, eight compilation albums, two live albums, six extended plays, twenty-two singles and four video releases.

=== Studio albums ===
List of studio albums, with selected chart positions and certifications
Title	Album details	Chart positions			Sales	Certifications (sales thresholds)
Title	Album details	UK	SCO	AUS	Sales	Certifications (sales thresholds)
Expecting to Fly	Released: 12 February 1996; Labels: A&M, Superior Quality; Formats: CD, cassette, LP	1	1	44	UK 300,000	BPI: Platinum
Return to the Last Chance Saloon	Released: 9 March 1998; Labels: A&M, Superior Quality; Formats: CD, cassette, LP	10	8	—	UK 100,000	BPI: Gold
Science & Nature	Released: 15 May 2000; Labels: Mercury, Superior Quality; Formats: CD, cassette, LP	7	8	—		
Luxembourg	Released: 12 May 2003; Label: Superior Quality; Formats: CD, LP	49	51	—		
The Bluetones	Released: 9 October 2006; Label: Cooking Vinyl; Formats: CD, LP, digital download	100	91	—		
A New Athens	Released: 31 May 2010; Label: CIA; Formats: CD, LP, digital download	—	—	—		
Atlas	Released: 1 May 2026; Label: Brainhole; Formats: CD, LP	—	20	—		

=== Live albums ===
- Once Upon a Time in West Twelve (2007)
- Bluetonic (2017) (reissue of Once Upon a Time in West Twelve)

=== Compilation albums ===
List of compilation albums, with selected chart positions and certifications
Title	Album details	Chart positions	Certifications (sales thresholds)
Title	Album details	UK	Certifications (sales thresholds)
Are You Blind?	Released: May 2000 (limited edition promotional CD); Labels: Superior Quality, A&M; Formats: CD, LP	—	
The Singles	Released: 8 April 2002; Labels: Superior Quality, Mercury; Formats: CD, CS	14	BPI: Silver
A Rough Outline: The Singles & B-sides 95 - 03	Released: 7 March 2006; Labels: Superior Quality, Mercury; Formats: 2xCD, 3xCD	156	
BBC Radio Sessions	Released: 26 February 2007; Label: Mercury; Format: CD	164	
The Early Garage Years	Released: 30 July 2007; Label: Cooking Vinyl; Format: CD	—	
Collection	Released: 21 April 2008; Label: Spectrum Music; Format: CD	—	
Superior Quality Recordings 1994-2002	Released: 6 August 2021; Label: Edsel; Format: 6xCD	—	
Superior Quality Recordings 2003-2010	Released: 12 August 2022; Label: Edsel; Format: 4xCD	—	

=== Extended plays ===
- A Bluetones Companion (1995) (Europe-and-Japan-only release)
- Mudslide EP (2000)
- Serenity Now (2005) (mail-order-only release)
- Drive Thru EP (2024)
- In The Cut EP (2025)
- London Weekend Television EP (2025)

=== Singles ===
List of singles, with selected chart positions
Year	Single	Chart positions			Certifications (sales thresholds)	Album
Year	Single	UK	AUS	IRL	Certifications (sales thresholds)	Album
1995	"Slight Return" (limited edition 7")	—	—	—		—
1995	"Are You Blue or Are You Blind?"	31	—	—		—
1995	"Bluetonic"	19		—		Expecting to Fly
1996	"Slight Return" (reissue)	2	60	15	BPI: Gold	Expecting to Fly
1996	"Cut Some Rug"	7	—	—		Expecting to Fly
1996	"Castle Rock"	7	—	—		—
1996	"Marblehead Johnson"	7	—	—		—
1998	"Solomon Bites the Worm"	10	—	—		Return to the Last Chance Saloon
1998	"If..."	13	—	—		Return to the Last Chance Saloon
1998	"Sleazy Bed Track"	35	—	—		Return to the Last Chance Saloon
1998	"4-Day Weekend" (mail-order-only release)	—	—	—		Return to the Last Chance Saloon
2000	"Keep the Home Fires Burning"	13	—	—		Science & Nature
2000	"Autophilia (or How I Learned to Stop Worrying and Love My Car)"	18	—	—		Science & Nature
2002	"After Hours"	26	—	—		The Singles
2003	"Fast Boy/Liquid Lips"	25	—	—		Luxembourg
2003	"Never Going Nowhere"	40	—	—		Luxembourg
2006	"My Neighbour's House"	68	—	—		The Bluetones
2006	"Head on a Spike"	135	—	—		The Bluetones
2007	"Surrendered"	—	—	—		The Bluetones
2010	"Carry Me Home"	—	—	—		A New Athens
2010	"Golden Soul"	—	—	—		A New Athens
2022	"Move Closer"	—	—	—		—
2022	"I Like to Lie"	—	—	—		A New Athens

=== Music videos ===
List of music videos, showing year released and director
Year	Title	Director
1995	"Are You Blue or Are You Blind?"	Thomas Napper
1995	"Bluetonic"	Dom & Nic
1996	"Slight Return"	Lindy Heymann
1996	"Cut Some Rug"	Hammer & Tongs
1996	"Marblehead Johnson"	Dom & Nic
1998	"Solomon Bites the Worm"	John Hardwick
1998	"If..."	Tony Hill
1998	"Sleazy Bed Track"	Unknown
1998	"4 Day Weekend"	Koji Morimoto
2000	"Keep the Home Fires Burning"	Edgar Wright
2000	"Mudslide"	Unknown
2000	"Autophilia (or How I Learned to Stop Worrying and Love My Car)"	Jake & Jim
2002	"After Hours"	Edgar Wright
2003	"Fast Boy"	Maggie Kelly
2003	"Never Going Nowhere"	Gareth McLennan
2006	"Head on a Spike"	Scott Morriss
2010	"Carry Me Home"	Scott Morriss
2010	"Golden Soul"	Scott Morriss
2025	"In The Cut"	Gerard Giorgi-Coll
2025	"London Weekend Television"	William Sash & Jack Stephenson

=== Video/DVD releases ===
- Mondo Concerto (1997) (reissued in 1998)
- Blue Movies (2007)
- Beat About the Bush (2007)
- Expecting to Fly Live (2009)
