= Ridge Farm Studio =

Former recording studio in England, United Kingdom

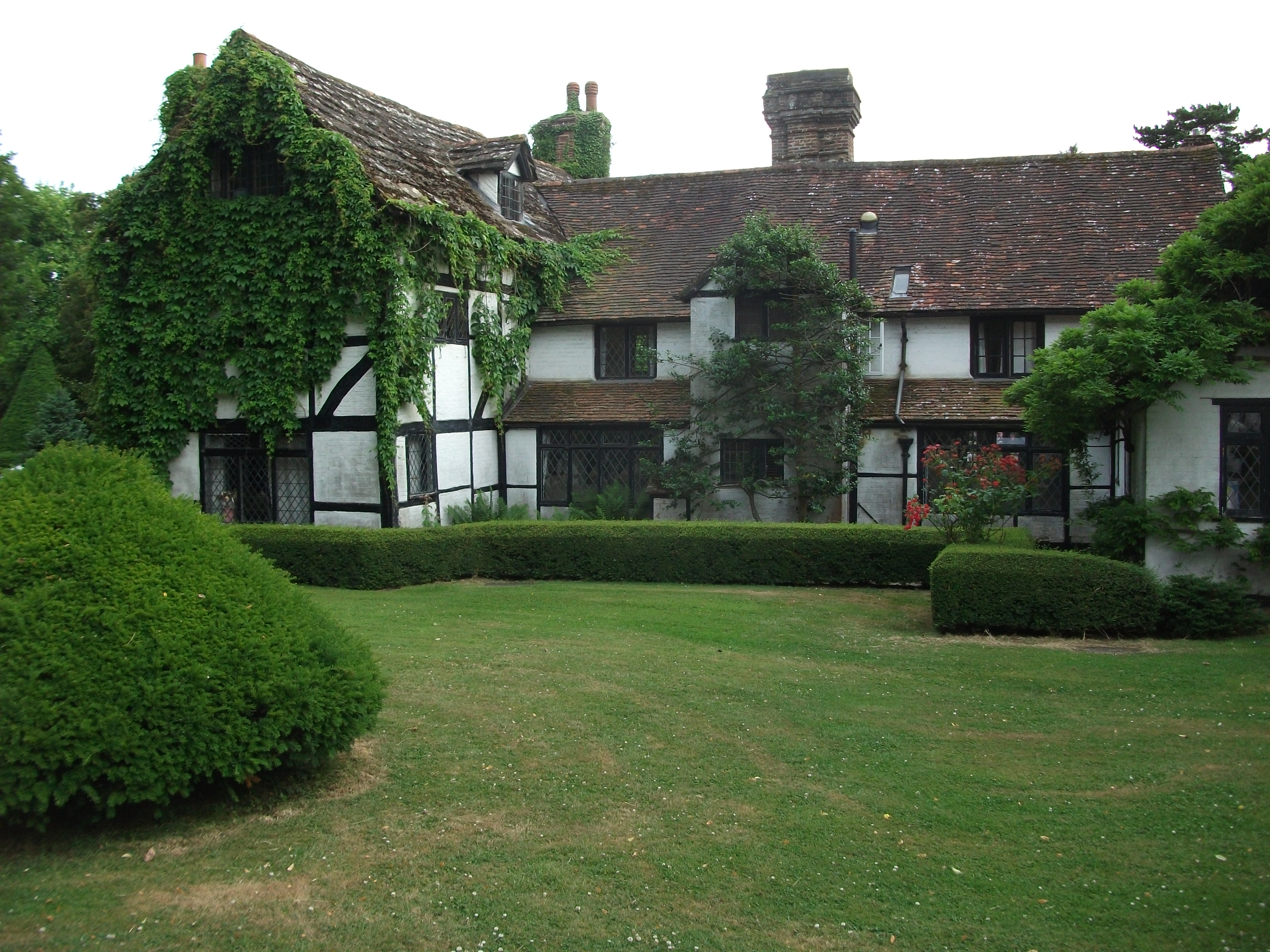
- Ridge Farm in 2015
- Type: Recording studio
- Industry: Music industry
- Founded: 1975
- Defunct: 2003
- Headquarters: Capel, Surrey, England
- Key people: Frank Andrews and Billy Andrews

Ridge Farm Studio was a recording studio located in the village of Rusper, England, near the Surrey and Sussex border. One of the earliest residential studios in the United Kingdom, it operated for over twenty-five years and had artists, musicians, and producers from all over the world record and produce music there.

The oldest part of the building, originally a medieval farmhouse, and what was to become Ridge Farm Studio, was built in the mid-17th century and additions to the building were added over the centuries. The studio was surrounded by 12 acres (49,000 m^{2}) of land that included gardens, orchards, meadows and woodland.

== History ==
The studio was established in 1975 by Frank Andrews, a lighting technician who had toured across the UK with bands such as Queen, ABBA, and the Rolling Stones. Andrews returned home from tour to discover his parents had moved to a different place, which is where Ridge Farm Studio was born. He started the studio with his brother, Billy, as a quiet place for bands to rehearse.

Ridge Farm Studio did well enough that Andrews was eventually able to buy the property from his parents. It remained a popular location well into the 1990s, after the surge of Britpop. However, bookings eventually dwindled. Joe Jackson was the last person to record there in 2002.

The studio's clients included the Smiths, Oasis, Supergrass, Roxy Music, Pearl Jam, Wet Wet Wet, OMD, Bad Company, Queen, Jethro Tull, Rush, Ozzy Osbourne, Mew, Brainstorm, and Gang of Four. It closed in early 2003, and it is now used as a facility for weddings, banquets and meetings.
