= Hugh Jones (producer) =

British record producer

Hugh Jones is a British record producer with many important post-punk, new wave and alternative rock albums to his credit.

== Career ==
In the early 1970s, Jones worked as an apprentice engineer in IBC Studios in Central London, while acting as lead singer in the band Mistral. He made his name in the early 1980s, with a jangly sound that was better received than those of many of his contemporaries. Though many of his early clients were big-name acts—Echo & the Bunnymen, the Sound, Modern English, and the Damned, for example—his recent production credits have been more esoteric, though many admire his work with the Charlatans and Kitchens of Distinction.

Jones was later closely associated with Rockfield Studios in Wales and recorded many of his most successful records there including those of Simple Minds, Echo & the Bunnymen, the Damned, Dumptruck, the Icicle Works, the Charlatans, Heidi Berry, Del Amitri, the Bluetones, Shack and Gene.

== Production credits ==
1970s

- 1973 - Return to Forever - Light as a Feather (engineer)
- 1976 - Ralph McTell - Another Star Ascending (The Boxer) (engineer)
- 1977 - London - Animal Games (engineer)
- 1979 - Simple Minds - Real to Real Cacophony (engineer)

1980s

- 1980 - Adam and the Ants - Kings of the Wild Frontier (engineer)
- 1980 - The Teardrop Explodes - Kilimanjaro (engineer)
- 1980 - Simple Minds - Empires and Dance (engineer)
- 1981 - Simple Minds - Sons and Fascination/Sister Feelings Call (engineer)
- 1981 - Echo & the Bunnymen - Heaven Up Here
- 1981 - The Sound - From the Lions Mouth
- 1981 - The Undertones - Positive Touch
- 1982 - Fiat Lux - several singles & one mini album (Hired History)
- 1983 - Clock DVA - Advantage
- 1983 - Monsoon - Third Eye (co-producer and engineer)
- 1982 - Modern English - After the Snow
- 1982 - The Damned - Strawberries
- 1984 - The Icicle Works - The Icicle Works
- 1984 - Modern English - Ricochet Days
- 1984 - Rubber Rodeo - Scenic Views
- 1985 - The Icicle Works - The Small Price of a Bicycle (one track)
- 1985 - The Colourfield - Virgins and Philistines
- 1985 - Stan Ridgway - The Big Heat (two tracks)
- 1985 - Del Amitri - Del Amitri
- 1986 - Here's Johnny - Hellzapoppin
- 1986 - I Can Crawl - Desert (two tracks)
- 1986 - Stump - Quirk Out
- 1986 - That Petrol Emotion - Manic Pop Thrill
- 1986 - Siouxsie and the Banshees - Tinderbox (engineer)
- 1987 - Balaam & the Angel - Greatest Story Ever Told
- 1987 - The Saints - All Fools Day
- 1987 - Dumptruck - For the Country
- 1988 - James - Strip-mine
- 1988 - Roe - Hombre (Single)
- 1988 - Stump - A Fierce Pancake
- 1988 - Voice of the Beehive - Let It Bee
- 1989 - Frazier Chorus - Sue
- 1989 - Mary My Hope - Suicide Kings
- 1989 - Del Amitri - Waking Hours
- 1989 - James Ray and the Performance - Dust Boat

1990s

- 1990 - Vagabond Joy - Baby's Not a Guru
- 1990 - Kitchens of Distinction - Strange Free World
- 1990 - Ultra Vivid Scene - Joy 1967-1990
- 1990 - The Connells - One Simple Word
- 1991 - Died Pretty - Doughboy Hollow
- 1991 - Vagabond Joy - We're Going Home
- 1992 - Richard Barone - Clouds Over Eden
- 1992 - The Charlatans - Between 10th and 11th
- 1992 - Pale Saints - In Ribbons
- 1993 - Heidi Berry - Heidi Berry
- 1993 - Died Pretty - Trace
- 1993 - Not Drowning, Waving - Circus
- 1994 - The Glee Club - Mine
- 1994 - Pale Saints - Slow Buildings
- 1994 - Dodgy - Homegrown
- 1994 - The Family Cat - Magic Happens
- 1996 - The Bluetones - Expecting to Fly
- 1996 - Heidi Berry - Miracle
- 1996 - Dodgy - Free Peace Sweet
- 1997 - The Mutton Birds - Envy of Angels
- 1998 - The Bluetones - Return to the Last Chance Saloon
- 1999 - Gene - Revelations
- 1999 - Shack - HMS Fable
- 1999 - Dream City Film Club - Stranger Blues

2000s

- 2001 - Gene - Libertine
- 2002 - The Charlatans - Songs from the Other Side
- 2002 - Easyworld - This Is Where I Stand
- 2004 - Obi - Diceman Lopez
- 2005 - Echo & the Bunnymen - Siberia
- 2006 - The Bluetones - The Bluetones
- 2006 - Harrisons - No Fighting in the War Room
- 2006 - My Elvis Blackout - Back in the Food Chain (EP)
- 2007 - My Elvis Blackout - Six Tracks (EP)
- 2007 - I Say Marvin - Powerdown!
- 2008 - I Say Marvin - Gloria
- 2010 - Modern English - Soundtrack
