= Mark Morriss =

English musician (born 1971)

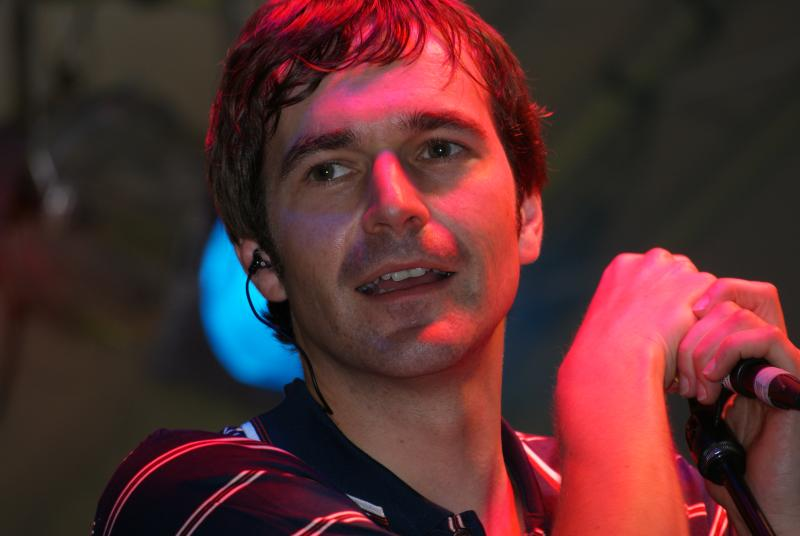
- Morriss in 2009

Background information
- Also known as: Fi-Lo Beddow
- Born: Mark James Morriss; 18 October 1971 (age 55); Chiswick, London, England
- Origin: Hounslow, London, England
- Genres: Indie rock; alternative rock; Britpop; soft rock; folk
- Occupations: Musician; singer; songwriter
- Instruments: Vocals; guitar
- Years active: 1993–present
- Labels: Fulfill; PledgeMusic; Acid Jazz; Reckless Yes
- Member of: The Bluetones
- Formerly of: The Bottlegarden; The Mummys; The Maypoles; The Helicopter of the Holy Ghost
- Website: markmorrissmusic.co.uk

Mark James Morriss (born 18 October 1971) is an English musician, singer and songwriter. He is the lead singer of the indie rock band the Bluetones. The older brother of bandmate/illustrator Scott Morriss, he began a solo career in 2006, fronted the backing group the Mummys, worked with Matt Berry's band the Maypoles, and sung lead vocals for the Helicopter of the Holy Ghost project.

Since 2008, Morriss has been playing solo shows across the UK while not touring with the Bluetones. Following the band's temporary split in 2011, he continued these shows and expanded his solo discography. Since 2023, he started touring acoustic shows across the UK with Bluetones guitarist Adam Devlin, playing their songs.

== Early life ==
Morriss was born in Chiswick, West London, although grew up in Hounslow, West London. His mother was a huge fan of music and named Morriss' younger brother Scott after British-American musician Scott Walker, and worked behind the bar at Shepperton Studios. His step-father was an accountant.

From a young age, Morriss showed a strong interest in football, considering Kenny Dalglish to be his hero, supporting Liverpool. Being the captain for his school football team for five years, he had trials for Crystal Palace at age 10. He stopped playing five years later, as he felt it was becoming too competitive.

Following an injury from a tree accident, Morriss was unable to play football in his free time and decided to spend more time in his school's music department, and ended up getting guitar lessons outside of school. In this time, he befriended some of the founding members of the Bottlegarden, a group from 1989 that Morriss was involved with until its disbandment in 1993, with its lasting members rebranding as the Bluetones.

At the time he was taking his A-levels, Morriss' mother was relocating to a small village in Cornwall as she was getting married since Morriss' father left home in 1983. Since he had issues with his step-father, he moved in with his former girlfriend's family, and Scott, who was in the middle of sitting his GCSEs, moved into their grandparents' house, which was on the same estate. One of the earliest tracks written by the Bluetones, "The Fountainhead", was written about Morriss not wanting to seem a disappointment to his grandfather, who he viewed as a father figure.

Morriss attended Cranford Community School and West Thames College, where he dropped out. He left school with six GCSEs and three A-levels in English, art and theatre studies.

== Career ==
=== The Bluetones ===
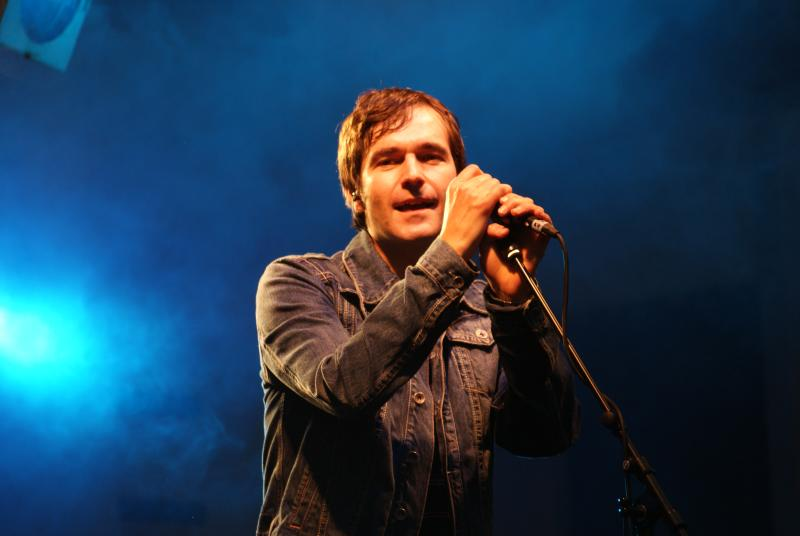
Morriss performing at Rochdale Feel Good Festival 2009

After leaving the Bottlegarden, Morriss co-formed the Bluetones in 1993 with his younger brother Scott Morriss and Adam Devlin. Their drummer left soon after their formation and they were introduced to Eds Chesters by their housemate Matthew Priest, the drummer of the rock band Dodgy. Chesters decided to leave his current group, Soho, to join the Bluetones. Previously playing rhythm guitar, Morriss experimented with performing vocals until they eventually found a lead vocalist although ended up sticking with the role. Although all members were credited as songwriters for their physical releases, Morriss primarily wrote some of their early songs like "Bluetonic", released in October 1995.

After signing to A&M Records, the band released their debut album Expecting to Fly on 12 February 1996. The album peaked at number one on the UK Albums Chart on first-week sales of 82,000, publicising Morriss as a new figure in the middle of the Britpop movement.

Melody Maker compared Morriss' early songwriting to the Smiths, the Stone Roses and the Field Mice. Sylvia Patterson of NME wrote that one of his songs is "incorrigibly cheery", and Everett True considered it to have "incandescent beauty". Examples of Morriss' influences are Bill Hicks, Buffalo Springfield, Love, Scott Walker, the Smiths, and the Stone Roses.

After the success of Expecting to Fly, the band spent a lot of time touring, which further delayed the production process of their second album. In August 1998, Morriss said "I'm still covered in scars and fucking cuts and bruises from the last tour, there was a bit of crowd trouble you see." Their second album, Return to the Last Chance Saloon, released on 9 March 1998, failed to repeat the same commercial performance their debut achieved as the post-Britpop era started to emerge. Peaking at number ten on the in the Top 40, It sold 100,000 copies, while Expecting to Fly sold 300,000. Despite this, he continued to release music until their initial split in 2011. After their reformation in April 2015, the band released their first album since 2010, Atlas, in May 2026.

=== Solo ===
Morriss performing at the Parish, Huddersfield, in 2009

At first, Morriss released music under the alias Fi-Lo Beddow, reluctant to use his name to begin with. The pseudonym comes from a rephrased name of the protagonist from the 1978 American action comedy film Every Which Way but Loose, Philo Beddoe. He embarked on this identity in March 2004 and self-released an EP of five tracks in February 2006, entitled The Fi-Lo Beddow EP.

Morriss released his debut solo album Memory Muscle in May 2008 to praised reviews. A folk-tinged record, it featured re-recorded versions of all five tracks from The Fi-Lo Beddow EP. As well as this, it contained two covers of songs from Teenage Fanclub and Lee Hazlewood. The strings on the record were arranged by film composer David Arnold, who became a fan of the Bluetones' 1996 debut album Expecting to Fly whilst scoring the science fiction action film Indpendence Day, released in the same year.

Following the Bluetones' initial split in September 2011, Morriss hosted a one-off solo show with Bluetones members Adam Devlin and Eds Chesters at the Queen of Hoxton in London on 17 January 2013 as part of his PledgeMusic campaign used to help fund the production money towards his planned second solo album, A Flash of Darkness. The album was released in 2013 as a Pledge campaign, although was reissued in 2014 through Acid Jazz Records. This was followed by another Acid Jazz release in 2015, The Taste of Mark Morriss, an album of covers of "artists as diverse as OMD and [the] Sisters of Mercy".

In August 2017, Morriss self-released his fourth solo album, Look Up, available through Pledge. After signing to Reckless Yes Records, the album received a reissue, and was given various special edition vinyl treatment.

=== Other collaborations ===
Morriss has recorded the theme music for all of the children's audiobooks written by David Walliams, released on HarperCollins. Morriss included these instrumentals on his second solo EP from 2013, This Is the Lie (And That's the Truth). He had known Walliams for around fifteen years prior, when Morriss "was the famous one." He became a member of Matt Berry's live band, the Maypoles, and regularly toured the UK with this outfit as a rhythm guitarist and backing vocalist. He additionally performed backing vocals on Berry's fourth studio album Kill the Wolf (2013), which was also released by Acid Jazz.

In 2021, Morriss appeared as the vocalist for Billy Reeves' the Helicopter of the Holy Ghost project, on their only album Afters. Morriss joined former theaudience member Reeves on the album, which was co-produced by Richard Archer of Hard-Fi, with the album also featuring members of Cocteau Twins, Engineers and Gazpacho.

In 2021, Morriss, Nigel Clark of Dodgy and Chris Helme of the Seahorses formed the short-lived supergroup together entitled MCH, their combined surname initials (Morriss, Clarke, Helme). They wrote songs together, trying to capture a "broad, poppy sound".

== Television appearances ==
In 2001, Morriss, alongside the other members of the Bluetones, had an uncredited cameo appearance in the second series of Edgar Wright's Spaced, who also directed the music videos for Bluetones singles "Keep the Home Fires Burning" (2000) and "After Hours" (2002). Later in 2003, Morriss had another cameo appearance and line in the first series of the sketch show Little Britain as a politician.

In May 2022, Morriss made a guest appearance in the fourteenth series of the BBC One quiz programme Pointless Celebrities, where he and Rick Witter of Shed Seven both won the jackpot for charity.

== Personal life ==
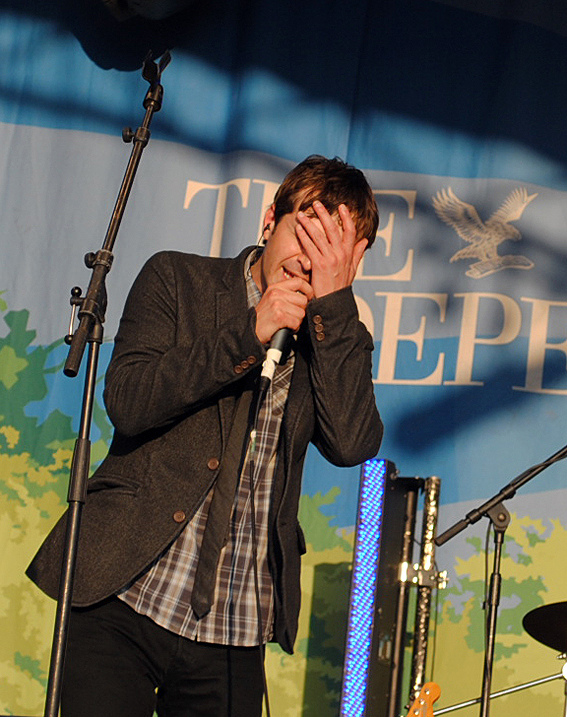
Morriss performing at Wychwood Festival 2011

Morriss has lived in Royal Tunbridge Wells, Kent since 2009, and was made aware of the town from playing there in March 2003 at The Forum, finding that something about the place "stuck" with him from the number of different towns he woke up in in the band's tour bus. He moved there as a commuter belt from London with plans to start a family. The band revisited The Forum as part of their 2011 farewell tour before their initial split.

=== Abuse allegations ===
In November 2021, allegations of emotional and physical abuse against Morriss were made by his ex-wife, Anna Wharton. Morriss disputed the claims, telling The Guardian, "I may have been thoughtless and selfish in some of the dealings in my personal life of late, but these allegations of abuse and gaslighting are wholly untrue, and I refute them completely." Following these allegations, Morriss was dropped from the Big Britpop Family Party in London, and dismissed from the Helicopter of the Holy Ghost. MCH's ending coincided with this.

On 2 March 2022, Morriss issued a statement on his website in response to his ex-wife's allegations made against him.

=== Views ===
When asked by Melody Maker in September 1995 seven reasons to hate, Morriss answered with Millwall F.C., lad culture, Saturday night "telly", anti-smokers, Sting, Bob Hoskins, and "98% of people in the music industry."

Morriss stated in September 2011 that he no longer reads NME as he finds it depressing because they write about "the new Rita Ora single or the X Factor winner single, which is not what you get into the NME for."

In May 2016, Morriss stated he shows no interest in the English rock band Oasis or their fanbase and that they "bore him shitless." While he explained he had nothing against their frontman Liam Gallagher, he said that he should focus on his clothing company, Pretty Green, rather than contemplating a potential musical comeback.

Three of the tracks from Morriss' 2019 fourth solo album, Look Up, were written about the Brexit vote. The outcome of the vote made him question his place in the country and how he had always perceived it.

When asked about his views on religion, Morriss said he was "baffled" by organised religion, but curious about spirtuality in people, more than "just the matter of which we're made." He said he believed that everyone is affected by everything in the world "on a deep, on a daily, and an unconscious, as well as conscious, level", and that having a sense of peace gives him comfort when needed. He is against the concept of "you must believe", as he finds an element of control behind them. Beyond morals, Morriss has stated he does not like the idea of rules.

=== Favourite albums ===
Morriss has cited his favourite albums as On the Beach by Neil Young, Purple Rain by Prince and the Revolution, Forever Changes by Love, Scott 4 by Scott Walker, Hatful of Hollow by the Smiths, Check Your Head by the Beastie Boys, Rio by Duran Duran, The Stone Roses by the Stone Roses, Substance 1987 by New Order, and Please by Pet Shop Boys.

== Discography ==
=== Solo ===
Albums

- Memory Muscle (2008)
- A Flash of Darkness (2014) (originally a Pledge campaign album, but reissued through the Acid Jazz label)
- The Taste of Mark Morriss (2015)
- Look Up (2019) (originally a Pledge campaign album, but reissued on vinyl in 2019 through the Reckless Yes label)

EPs

- The Fi-Lo Beddow EP (2006)
- This Is the Lie (And That's the Truth) (2014)

Singles

- "I'm Sick" (2008)
- "Lay Low" (2008) (download-only)
- "Space Cadet" (2014)
- "Lucretia (My Reflection)" (2015)
- "All the Wrong People" (2019)
- "The Beans" (2019)

=== The Bluetones ===
- Expecting to Fly (1996)
- Return to the Last Chance Saloon (1998)
- Science & Nature (2000)
- Luxembourg (2003)
- The Bluetones (2006)
- A New Athens (2010)
- Atlas (2026)
