= Adam Devlin =

English musician (born 1969)

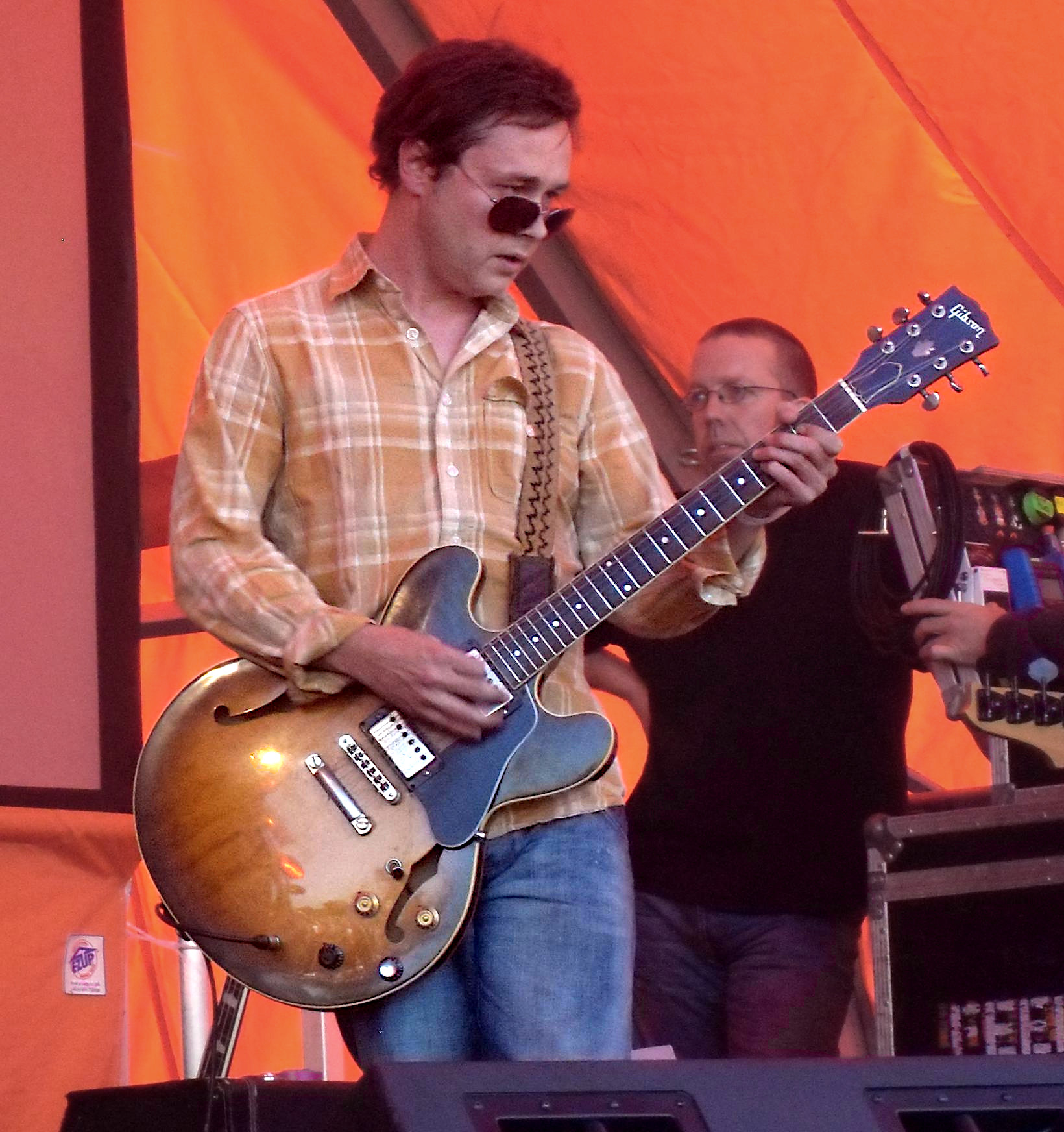
- Devlin in 2011

Background information
- Born: Adam Tadek Gorecki; 17 September 1969 (age 57); Lambeth, London, England
- Origin: Hounslow, London, England
- Genres: Indie rock; alternative rock; jangle pop; Britpop
- Occupations: Musician; guitarist; songwriter
- Instrument: Electric guitar
- Years active: 1993–present
- Member of: The Bluetones
- Formerly of: A Perfect Mess; Thee Cee Cees
- Website: x.com/ad_I_am

Adam Patrick Devlin (born 17 September 1969) is an English musician and songwriter. He is the guitarist of the indie rock band the Bluetones, and has been described as one of the most skilled guitarists from the Britpop era.

== Early life ==
Devlin was born in Lambeth, South London, and was raised in a household passionate for football. His family supported Chelsea and he experimented with various different teams to support but decided to stay with Brentford. The Bluetones' biggest hit, "Slight Return", depicts a bombus lucorum bee on its single cover as a nod to Brentford's logo.

Growing up, Devlin showed a large interest in music. He mostly listened to bands such as the Smiths, Orange Juice, Aztec Camera, Felt, the Alarm and Big Country. Between the ages of 16 to 19, he went to two gigs every week.

Devlin attended Gunnersbury School for Boys and left with 10 O-levels and 1 A-level in art. He dropped out of college to become a graphic designer.

== Career ==
The Bluetones frontman, Mark Morriss, met Devlin while moving into a shared house while in another local Hounslow rivalry Madchester-inspired baggy group called A Perfect Mess. Since Morriss and his brother Scott were in a group together where its founding members were leaving, called the Bottlegarden, they shared their frustration with Devlin and said it would work out for them if he could join their group which he agreed to. After their drummer left, the three continued to write music together and ended up disbanding and reforming as the Bluetones. As they started to achieve record success, Devlin was living in another shared house in Wimbledon.

Ted Kessler of NME wrote in January 1995 that Devlin "plays with the skill and dexterity of a man with either three hands or Johnny Marr's genes." In February 1995, Melody Maker referred to him as an "embryonic John Squire". When asked by The Independent's Jennifer Rodger how he would describe himself as a musician in April 1998, Devlin responded "As a kind of soulful, pop, rock extravaganza. A revue. Rustic, urbane and uncivilised."

On receiving Britpop backlash in January 1998, Devlin stated "Britpop did go belly up, but the acid test is if we come out of that unscathed. Most of those bands have fallen flat on their face, but I can't see that happening to us."

In 1999, the band initially recruited Orange Juice lead singer Edwyn Collins to produce their 2000 third studio album, Science & Nature. After a "plain awful" recording session of three songs, they realised they had chosen the wrong producer and that it was a difficult time for Collins in his personal life. Devlin described this as a "massive shame" for him as he was a big fan of Orange Juice.

Devlin performing at Shepherd's Bush Empire in 2011

Following the Bluetones' split in 2011, Devlin formed Thee Cee Cees with singer-songwriter Chris T-T. The band released their debut album Solution Songs in 2015. He also played guitar on Morriss' solo EP, The Fi-Lo Beddow EP, in February 2006.

On 17 January 2013, alongside Morriss and the Bluetones drummer Eds Chesters, Devlin played a one-off gig at the Queen of Hoxton in London as part of Morriss' Pledge campaign to help fund money for the production of his second solo album, A Flash of Darkness.

In 2015, the Bluetones reformed for a tour of the UK, which coincided with the forthcoming twentieth anniversary of their 1996 debut album, Expecting to Fly.

Since 2023, Devlin and Morriss started performing acoustic shows around the UK outside of band tours.

== Guitars ==
Devlin playing a Gibson ES-335 at the Rochdale Feel Good Festival in 2009

As a late teenager, Devlin gained an interest in Rickenbacker guitars because of guitarists who used them, such as Johnny Marr of the Smiths, Paul Weller of the Jam, and Roger McGuinn of the Byrds. This was also because when he gained an interest in playing the guitar, he kept seeing them and liked the way they looked visually. He played both the Rickenbacker 360 and the Rickenbacker 360/12 on Expecting to Fly.

For their 1998 second album, Return to the Last Chance Saloon, Devlin switched to the Gretsch Duo Jet and the 1996 Fender Telecaster for a more "robust" approach in an attempt to create a different sounding record. Some of the other guitars he played later in his career were the Epiphone Casino and the Gibson ES-335.

== Personal life ==
On 29 March 2016, Devlin's brother Simon Gorecki was murdered along with his partner Natasha Sadler-Ellis at their home in Canterbury, Kent, by her ex-boyfriend. Following their deaths, they appeared in the second series of Channel 5's A Killer Makes a Call. Devlin told KentOnline "I'm of course curious to see the documentary and I'll absolutely watch it as it will be hard not to."

== Discography ==
=== The Bluetones ===
- Expecting to Fly (1996)
- Return to the Last Chance Saloon (1998)
- Science & Nature (2000)
- Luxembourg (2003)
- The Bluetones (2006)
- A New Athens (2010)
- Atlas (2026)

=== Fi-Lo Beddow ===
- The Fi-Lo Beddow EP (2006)

=== Thee Cee Cees ===
- Solution Songs (2015)
