= Eds Chesters =

English musician (born 1971)

- Chesters in 2016

Background information
- Born: Edward Daniel Chesters; 24 October 1971 (age 55); Bishop Auckland, County Durham, England
- Genres: Indie rock; alternative rock; Britpop
- Occupations: Musician; drummer; songwriter; osteopath
- Instrument: Drum kit
- Years active: 1990–2011, 2015–present
- Member of: The Bluetones; Some Dogs
- Formerly of: Puppy Dogs From Hell; Brando; Soho

Edward Daniel Chesters (born 24 October 1971) is an English musician, drummer and osteopath. He is the drummer, percussionist and partial songwriter of the indie rock band the Bluetones and the former drummer of the pop trio Soho. Additionally, he works with the country band Some Dogs.

== Early life ==
Chesters was born in Bishop Auckland, County Durham. He developed an interest in music from a young age and later cited his influences on his career particularly from the 1960s. His older brothers, who he got most of his music interests from, were in bands and one of their friends taught him how to play boogie-woogie on piano. He credited this as an introduction to the rhythm of drumming after getting his left hand to create a rhythm and his right to create a riff. His brother in law became a tour manager for the Bluetones.

Chesters discovered drumming at age 11 through one of his brothers who owned a kit. For years, he tried playing similarly to Small Faces drummer Kenney Jones, and later Reni of the Stone Roses. Some of his other influences around this time were Ringo Starr of the Beatles, John Bonham of Led Zeppelin and Clyde Stubblefield.

The first band Chesters joined was in the market town Crook when he was 13, playing after school days. Before moving to London, he spent time in other local bands called Puppy Dogs From Hell and Brando. He left his comprehensive school with three A-levels in maths, physics, and chemistry. Chesters' older brother was approached by Soho, asking if he wanted to join them. Since he was already in a group, he suggested Chesters instead who was studying chemistry at university at the time and could have become a pharmacist.

== Career ==
After joining Soho, Chesters was offered a tour of America with them. Since he was a year into a course at Newcastle University, he had to decide whether to accept the tour offer or to continue the course. He ended up agreeing to tour, moving to London and spending a year touring with them. Soon after, the group began making plans to record a second album and Chesters felt as if he was not involved and did not fit in, mainly because of the age gap between him and the rest of the members. He also found it hard gaining significant chart success at 19 with their 1990 hit single "Hippychick" and that they used drum machines and sequencers. He also appeared on the Top of the Pops broadcast performance of the single. After seeing the Verve play their first London gig at The Dome in Tufnell Park in 1991, he had second thoughts about being with Soho.

After spending time at the Dodgy Club in Hounslow, Chesters was made aware by Dodgy's drummer Matthew Priest that his housemates at the time, the other three members of the Bluetones, were looking for a replacement drummer. The three would occasionally attend the club and Priest introduced them to him. Chesters said that he and the lead singer Mark Morriss "instantly clicked", being a similar age with the same interests. After spending time with the band, he mentioned it was inevitable they would end up together even though he was getting lots of money from Soho, finding it was right for him. One night, Chesters came to their house in 1993 and listened to "A Parting Gesture" without its drums, which was the first song they had demoed as a band, and decided to join after this.

In 2000, Chesters sang lead vocals on "Soup du Jour", one of the B-sides to "Autophilia (or How I Learned to Stop Worrying and Love My Car)", the band's second single from their third album, Science & Nature.

Chesters graduated from the British School of Osteopathy in 2010 and has been a member of the General Osteopathic Council since the same year. He works as a qualified mobile osteopath in Ealing, helping people of all ages with musculoskeletal conditions and specialises in back pain and injury.

After the band's split in 2011, Along with Morriss and Bluetones guitarist Adam Devlin, Chesters played a one-off gig at the Queen of Hoxton in London on 17 January 2013 as part of Morriss' Pledge campaign to help fund his second solo album, A Flash of Darkness. Although the whole band started feeling ready for a comeback in 2015, Chesters sending an email to them all asking this sold the idea to them.
