= List of UK charts and number-one singles (1969–1988) =

The UK Singles Chart is the official chart for the United Kingdom of singles. The chart is compiled by the Official Charts Company and the beginning of an "official" singles chart is generally regarded as February 1969 when the British Market Research Bureau (BMRB) started to compile the chart in a joint venture between the BBC and Record Retailer. Charts were used to measure the popularity of music and, initially, were based on sheet music. In 1952, NME imitated an American idea from Billboard magazine and began compiling a chart based on physical sales of the release. Rival publications such as Record Mirror, Melody Maker, Disc began to compile their own charts in the mid-to-late 1960s. Trade paper Record Retailer compiled its first chart in March 1960.

This list covers the period from the start of the BMRB chart in February 1969 to the last independently compiled charts of NME and Melody Maker in May 1988 (after which both published the Market Research Information Bureau chart). This period includes the point at which compilation of the UK Singles Chart was taken over by Gallup in January 1983.

During these 19 years, there were a total of 343 "canonical" number-ones, plus an additional 150 that are not recognised by the Official Charts Company. From 1969 to 1971, the figure also included additional number-ones from Top Pops (which changed its name to Music Now in 1970); in 1969, six of the "non-canonical" number-ones only reached the top of their charts, a figure that would never be repeated. 36 non-canonical number-ones only made the top of NME's charts, while Melody Maker had 44 stand-alone number-ones. Eleven of the number-ones in the Official Charts' canon did not make the top of any of the other charts.

Notable differences between the canonical and non-canonical charts include the Christmas 1980 season, when NME and Melody Maker had Jona Lewie's "Stop the Cavalry at number-one while the canonical seasonal number-one was "There's No One Quite Like Grandma" by St Winifred's School Choir. One of the more controversial instances of the BMRB era involved the Sex Pistols' anti-monarchy single "God Save the Queen," which NME had at number-one during the Silver Jubilee of Elizabeth II. The single, released by Virgin Records, was the highest-selling single of the week but had been banned by the BBC and some major retailers. To prevent it from reaching the top of the BMRB chart, for one-week compilers "decreed that shops which sold their own records could not have those records represented in the chart", thus sales from Virgin Megastores were not counted. Despite reaching number-two on the official chart, it is sometimes referred to as reaching number one. However, "God Save the Queen" reached no higher than number five on the Melody Maker chart.

== Main charts ==
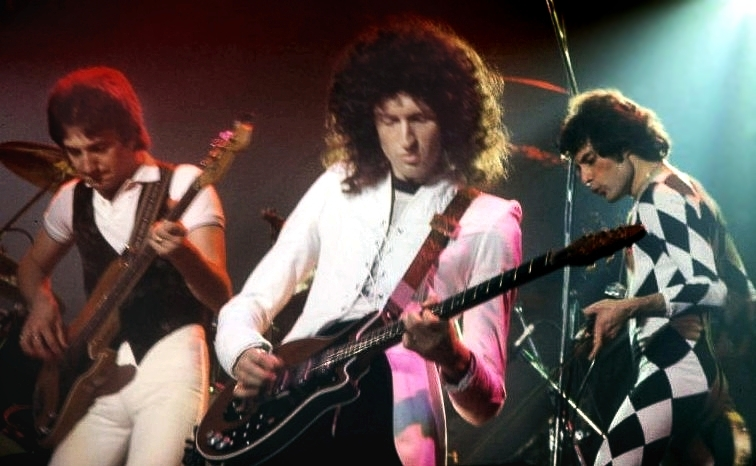
Queen, who spent nine weeks at number one with "Bohemian Rhapsody" in 1975, also had two number-ones that are not recognised in the Official Charts Company's canon.

=== British Market Research Bureau (BMRB) ===
On 15 February 1969, the BMRB was commissioned in a joint venture by the BBC and Record Retailer to compile the singles and album charts. BMRB compiled the first chart from postal returns of sales logs from 250 record shops. The sampling cost approximately £52,000 and shops were randomly chosen and submitted figures for sales taken up to the close of trade on Saturday. The data was compiled on Monday and given to the BBC on Tuesday to be announced on Johnnie Walker's afternoon show and later published in Record Retailer (rebranded Music Week in 1972). However, the BMRB often struggled to have the full sample of sales figures returned by post. The 1971 postal strike meant that data had to be collected by telephone but this was deemed inadequate for a national chart, and by 1973 the BMRB was using motorcycle couriers to collect sales figures. A World in Action documentary exposé in 1980 revealed corruption within the industry; stores' chart-returns dealers would frequently be offered bribes to falsify sales logs.

=== New Musical Express (NME) ===
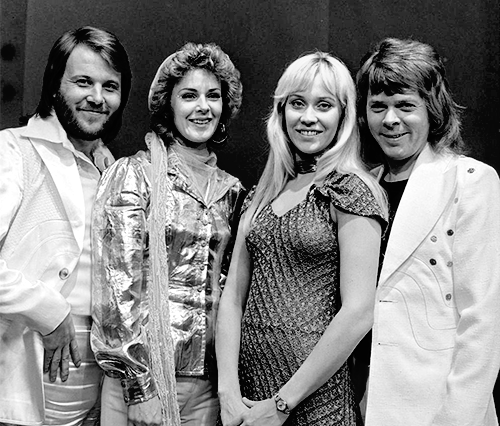
ABBA, who had a total of eleven number-one singles between 1974 and 1982 – nine of which topped the official charts, and an additional two not recognised in the Official Charts Company's canon.

The New Musical Express (NME) chart was the first in the United Kingdom to gauge musics' popularity by physical sales – previously sheet music sales were used. NME's co-founder Percy Dickins imitated the chart produced by American Billboard magazine and began to compile Britain's first hit parade in 1952. Other periodicals produced their own charts and The Official Charts Company and Guinness' British Hit Singles & Albums regard NME as the canonical British singles chart until 10 March 1960. After this Record Retailer is regarded as the canonical source until February 1969, when the BMRB chart began. However, during the 1960s NME had the biggest circulation of charts in the decade and was the most widely followed.

After 1969, NME continued to compile charts in the 1970s and 1980s and ended its time as the longest running independently compiled in May 1988.

=== Melody Maker ===
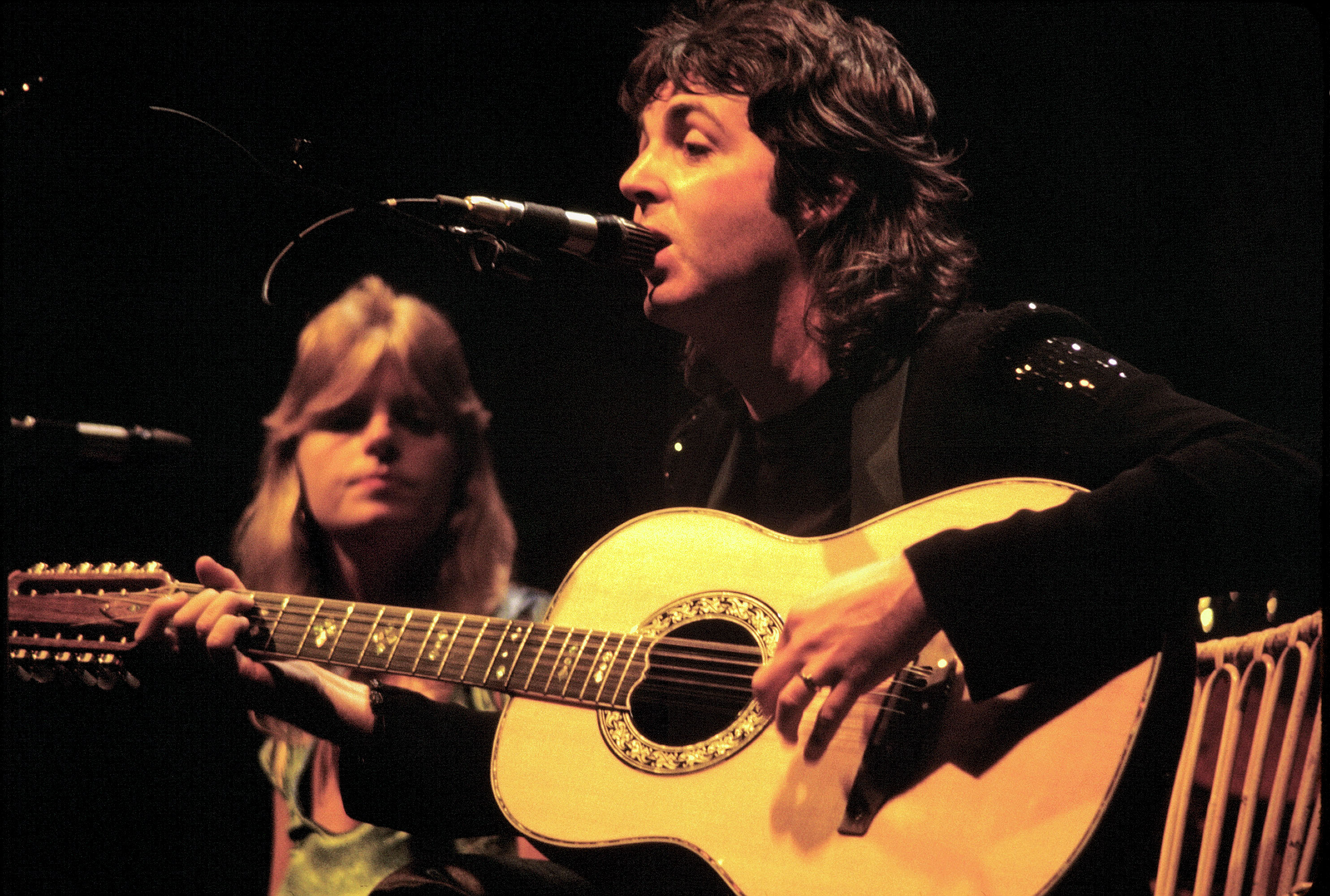
Paul McCartney with wife and Wings band member Linda. McCartney wrote the Wings song "Mull of Kintyre" which was the best selling record of the decade; in 1976 the band had two additional number-ones (one on each of the "other" charts) that are not recognised in the Official Charts Company's canon.

Melody Maker compiled its own chart from 1956 until 1988 which was used by many national newspapers. It was the third periodical to compile a chart and rivaled existing compilers NME and Record Mirror. Melody Maker's chart, like NME's, was based on a telephone poll of record stores. Melody Maker compiled a Top 20 for its first chart using figures from 19 shops on 7 April 1956. During the 1950s, sample sizes ranged from around 14–33 shops and on 30 July 1960 the phoning of record shops was supplemented with postal returns; the first chart to use this method sampled 38 stores from 110 returns. On 26 August 1967, Disc, owned by the same company as Melody Maker, stopped compiling their own chart and started using the Melody Maker chart. In its 9 February 1963 edition, Melody Maker disclosed that it received chart returns from 245 retailers and that its chart was audited by auditors supplied by Middlesex County Council. By the end of 1969, however, with the establishment of the BMRB chart, Melody Maker and NME had reduced their sample pool to 100 stores.

=== Top Pops ===
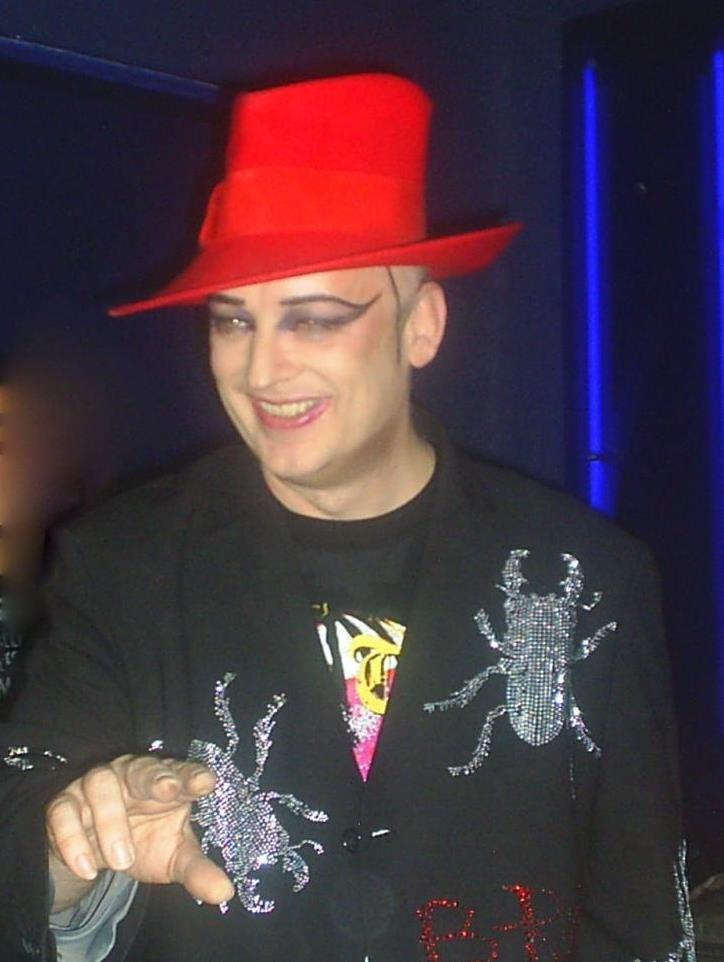
During the 1980s, Culture Club had two "official" number ones, plus two others not recognised in the Official Charts Company's canon.

Top Pops was founded initially as a monthly publication in May 1967. In May 1968 it began compiling a chart based on the telephone sample of 12 W H Smith & Son stores. The charts and paper became weekly the following month. Rebranded Music Now by 1970, the chart and paper ceased publication the following year.

=== Gallup ===
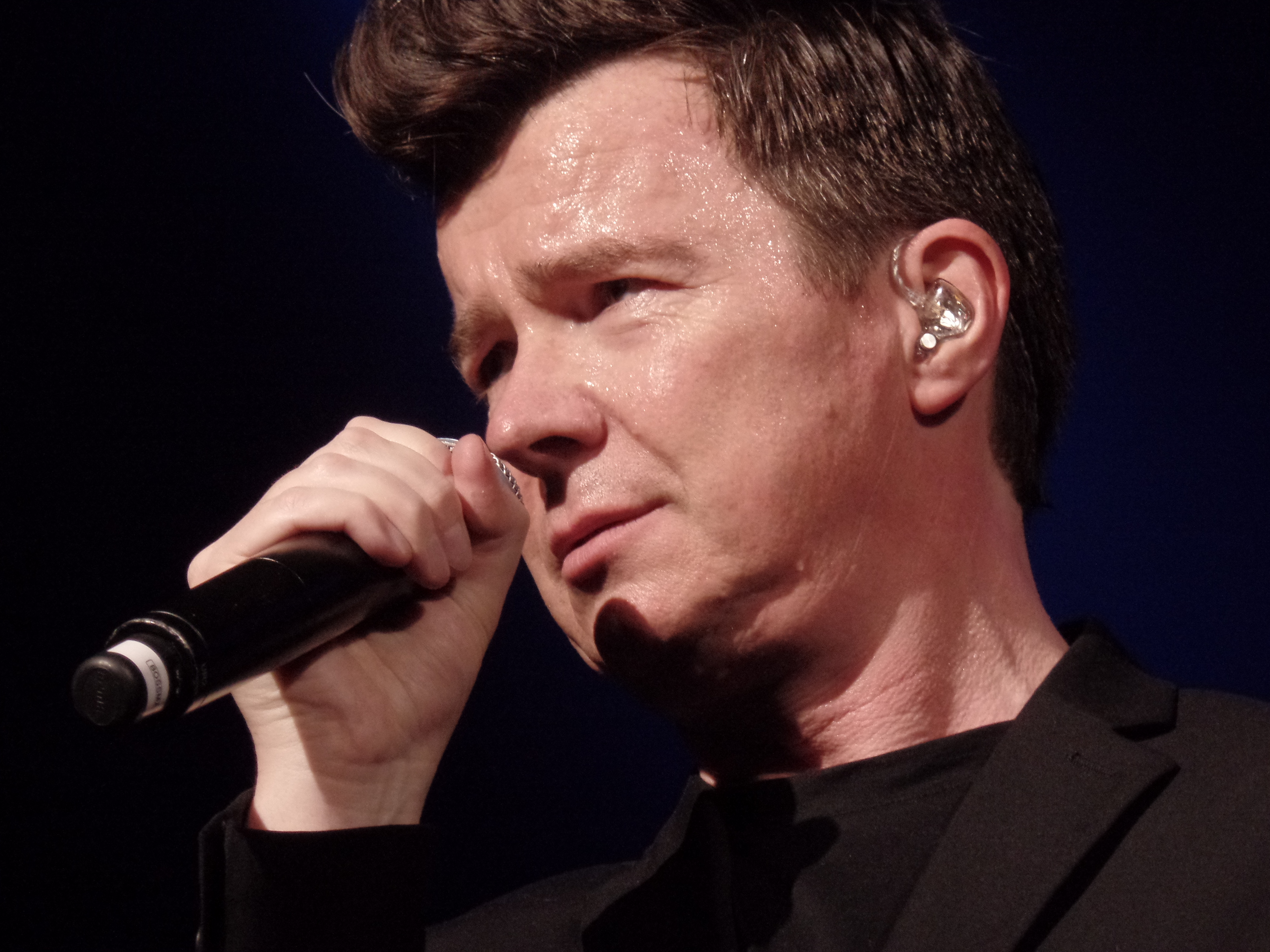
Rick Astley (pictured in 2017) had the distinction of charting the last non-canonical number-one in 1988 with "Together Forever."

On 4 January 1983, compilation of the UK single and album charts was taken over by Gallup who began the introduction of computerised tills which automated the data collection process. The chart was based entirely on sales of physical singles from retail outlets and announced on Tuesday until October 1987, when the Top 40 was revealed each Sunday, due to the new automated process. Gallup would continue to compile the single and album charts for a few more years past the elimination of NME and Melody Maker's independently compiled charts after the 14 May 1988 issues and their switching starting the next week to charts compiled by the Market Research Information Bureau., until 30 June 1990 when the British Phonographic Industry (BPI) terminated its contract with them and switched to a new entity, Chart Information Network (Note: Spotlight Publications is a subsidiary of United Newspapers), which would change its name to The Official UK Charts Company in November 2001.

== Comparison of chart number-ones (1969–1988) ==
Key
| 1–10 | The number of weeks spent as a number-one single on a chart regarded as canonical by the Official Charts Company. |
| No | The single did not reach number one on the chart regarded as canonical at the time. |
| 1–10 | The number of weeks spent as a number-one single on a chart regarded not as canonical by the Official Charts Company. |
| No | The single did not reach number one on the listed chart (which was not regarded as canonical at the time). |
| * | One of the weeks as number-one single was spent jointly with another single and, for the purposes of sorting, is considered less than acts whose time at number one was outright. |

The canonical sources referred to above are BMRB for number ones 266–512 and Gallup for number ones 512–608

Edit by chart considered the canonical source: BMRB • Gallup

| No. (Note: According to the Official Charts Company and the canonical sources, chronologically, which number one it was.) | Artist | Single | BMRB (Note: The names, singles and duration of the number-ones are those given by The Official Charts Company.) | NME (Note: The names, singles and duration of the number-ones are from the NME.) | Melody Maker | Top Pops (Note: The names, singles and duration of the number-ones are from Top Pops (later Music Now).) | Gallup (Note: The names, singles and duration of the number-ones are those given by The Official Charts Company.) |
| No. | Artist | Single | Weeks at number one | | | | |
|---|---|---|---|---|---|---|---|
| 266 | Amen Corner | "(If Paradise Is) Half as Nice" | 2 | 1 | 2 | 2 | — |
| 267 | Peter Sarstedt | "Where Do You Go To (My Lovely)?" | 1 | 4 | 4 | 2 | — |
| 268 | Marvin Gaye | "I Heard It Through the Grapevine" | 3 | 3 | 3 | 2 | — |
| 269 | Desmond Dekker & The Aces | "Israelites" | 1 | 2 | 1 | 1 | — |
| 270 | The Beatles with Billy Preston | "Get Back" | 6 | 5 | 5 | 3 | — |
| — | Herman's Hermits | "My Sentimental Friend" | No | No | No | 2 | — |
| 271 | Tommy Roe | "Dizzy" | 1 | 2 | 2 | 2 | — |
| 272 | The Beatles | "The Ballad of John and Yoko" | 3 | 2 | 3 | 2 | — |
| 273 | Thunderclap Newman | "Something in the Air" | 3 | 2 | 1 | 1 | — |
| — | Edwin Hawkins Singers | "Oh Happy Day" | No | No | No | 2 | — |
| — | Elvis Presley | "In the Ghetto" | No | 1 | 1 | 1 | — |
| 274 | The Rolling Stones | "Honky Tonk Women" | 5 | 5 | 5 | 2 | — |
| — | Robin Gibb | "Saved by the Bell" | No | No | No | 2 | — |
| — | Stevie Wonder | "My Cherie Amour" | No | No | No | 1 | — |
| 275 | Zager and Evans | "In The Year 2525 (Exordium and Terminus)" | 3 | 3 | 3 | 4 | — |
| 276 | Creedence Clearwater Revival | "Bad Moon Rising" | 3 | 3 | 5 | No | — |
| — | Bee Gees | "Don't Forget to Remember" | No | No | No | 1 | — |
| 277 | Jane Birkin and Serge Gainsbourg | "Je t'aime... moi non plus" | 1 | No | No | 2 | — |
| 278 | Bobbie Gentry | "I'll Never Fall in Love Again" | 1 | 3 | 3 | 2 | — |
| 279 | The Archies | "Sugar, Sugar" | 8 | 4 | 4 | 2 | — |
| — | Fleetwood Mac | "Oh Well" | No | 1 | No | 2 | — |
| — | The Tremeloes | "(Call Me) Number One" | No | No | No | 2 | — |
| — | Stevie Wonder | "Yester-Me, Yester-You, Yesterday" | No | 1 | 1 | No | — |
| — | Kenny Rogers and The First Edition | "Ruby, Don't Take Your Love to Town" | No | 1 | No | 1 | — |
| 280 | Rolf Harris | "Two Little Boys" | 6 | 6 | 6 | 6 | — |
| — | Marmalade | "Reflections of My Life" | No | 1 | 1 | 1 | — |
| 281 | Edison Lighthouse | "Love Grows (Where My Rosemary Goes)" | 5 | 3 | 3 | 3 | — |
| — | The Jackson 5 | "I Want You Back" | No | 1 | 1 | 3 | — |
| 282 | Lee Marvin | "Wand'rin' Star" | 3 | 3 | 3 | No | — |
| 283 | Simon & Garfunkel | "Bridge over Troubled Water" | 3 | 4 | 4 | 5 | — |
| 284 | Dana | "All Kinds of Everything" | 2 | No | No | No | — |
| 285 | Norman Greenbaum | "Spirit in the Sky" | 2 | 2 | 4 | 4 | — |
| 286 | England World Cup Squad "70" | "Back Home" | 3 | 3 | 1 | 1 | — |
| — | The Moody Blues | "Question" | No | 1 | No | No | — |
| 287 | Christie | "Yellow River" | 1 | 1 | 3 | 1 | — |
| 288 | Mungo Jerry | "In the Summertime" | 7 | 4 | 4 | 4 | — |
| — | Free | "All Right Now" | No | 3 | 3 | 4 | — |
| — | The Kinks | "Lola" | No | 1 | No | No | — |
| 289 | Elvis Presley | "The Wonder of You" | 6 | 3 | 5 | 3 | — |
| 290 | Smokey Robinson and The Miracles | "The Tears of a Clown" | 1 | 4 | 2 | 4 | — |
| 291 | Freda Payne | "Band of Gold" | 6 | 5 | 5 | 5 | — |
| — | Deep Purple | "Black Night" | No | 1 | 1 | 1 | — |
| 292 | Matthews' Southern Comfort | "Woodstock" | 3 | 3 | 3 | 3 | — |
| 293 | Jimi Hendrix Experience | "Voodoo Child" | 1 | 1 | No | No | — |
| — | Don Fardon | "Indian Reservation" | No | No | 1 | 1 | — |
| 294 | Dave Edmunds's Rockpile | "I Hear You Knocking" | 6 | 3 | 2 | 2 | — |
| — | McGuinness Flint | "When I'm Dead and Gone" | No | 1 | 3 | 3 | — |
| 295 | Clive Dunn | "Grandad" | 3 | 4 | 3 | 3 | — |
| 296 | George Harrison | "My Sweet Lord" | 5 | 6 | 7 | 4 | — |
| 297 | Mungo Jerry | "Baby Jump" | 2 | 1 | 1 | — | — |
| — | Paul McCartney | "Another Day" | No | 1 | No | — | — |
| 298 | T. Rex | "Hot Love" | 6 | 5 | 5* | — | — |
| 299 | Dave and Ansel Collins | "Double Barrel" | 2 | 2 | 2* | — | — |
| — | The Rolling Stones | "Brown Sugar" | No | 1 | No | — | — |
| 300 | Dawn | "Knock Three Times" | 5 | 3 | 3 | — | — |
| — | Free | "My Brother Jake" | No | 1 | No | — | — |
| — | Tony Christie | "I Did What I Did for Maria" | No | 1 | 1 | — | — |
| 301 | Middle of the Road | "Chirpy Chirpy Cheep Cheep" | 5 | 5 | 5 | — | — |
| 302 | T. Rex | "Get It On" | 4 | 3 | 3 | — | — |
| — | The New Seekers | "Never Ending Song of Love" | No | 1 | 1* | — | — |
| 303 | Diana Ross | "I'm Still Waiting" | 4 | 3 | 3* | — | — |
| 304 | The Tams | "Hey Girl Don't Bother Me" | 3 | 2 | 3 | — | — |
| 305 | Rod Stewart | "Reason to Believe" / "Maggie May" | 5 | 6 | 6 | — | — |
| 306 | Slade | "Coz I Luv You" | 4 | 3 | 3 | — | — |
| 307 | Benny Hill | "Ernie (The Fastest Milkman in the West)" | 4 | 5 | 5 | — | — |
| 308 | The New Seekers | "I'd Like to Teach the World to Sing (In Perfect Harmony)" | 4 | 4 | 4 | — | — |
| — | America | "A Horse with No Name" | No | 1 | No | — | — |
| 309 | T. Rex | "Telegram Sam" | 2 | 1 | 2 | — | — |
| 310 | Chicory Tip | "Son of My Father" | 3 | 2 | 2 | — | — |
| — | Don McLean | "American Pie" | No | 1 | 1 | — | — |
| 311 | Nilsson | "Without You" | 5 | 6 | 5 | — | — |
| 312 | Royal Scots Dragoon Guards | "Amazing Grace" | 4 | 4 | 5 | — | — |
| 313 | T. Rex | "Metal Guru" | 4 | 4 | 3 | — | — |
| 314 | Don McLean | "Vincent" | 2 | 3 | 3 | — | — |
| — | Gary Glitter | "Rock and Roll Parts 1 & 2" | No | No | 1 | — | — |
| 315 | Slade | "Take Me Bak 'Ome" | 1 | 1 | No | — | — |
| 316 | Donny Osmond | "Puppy Love" | 5 | 4 | 4 | — | — |
| 317 | Alice Cooper | "School's Out" | 3 | 3 | 3 | — | — |
| 318 | Rod Stewart | "You Wear It Well" | 1 | 2 | 2 | — | — |
| 319 | Slade | "Mama Weer All Crazee Now" | 3 | 2 | 2 | — | — |
| — | T. Rex | "Children of the Revolution" | No | 1 | 1 | — | — |
| 320 | David Cassidy | "How Can I Be Sure" | 2 | 1 | 1 | — | — |
| 321 | Lieutenant Pigeon | "Mouldy Old Dough" | 4 | 4 | 5 | — | — |
| 322 | Gilbert O'Sullivan | "Clair" | 2 | 2 | 2 | — | — |
| 323 | Chuck Berry | "My Ding-a-Ling" | 4 | 3 | 5 | — | — |
| — | Slade | "Gudbuy T'Jane" | No | 1 | No | — | — |
| 324 | Little Jimmy Osmond | "Long Haired Lover from Liverpool" | 5 | 4 | 2 | — | — |
| — | David Bowie | "The Jean Genie" | No | 1 | 1 | — | — |
| 325 | Sweet | "Blockbuster" | 5 | 4 | 4 | — | — |
| — | Strawbs | "Part of the Union" | No | 2 | 2 | — | — |
| 326 | Slade | "Cum On Feel the Noize" | 3 | 2 | 2 | — | — |
| 327 | Donny Osmond | "The Twelfth of Never" | 1 | 2 | 2 | — | — |
| 328 | Gilbert O'Sullivan | "Get Down" | 2 | 1 | 1 | — | — |
| 329 | Dawn featuring Tony Orlando | "Tie a Yellow Ribbon Round the Ole Oak Tree" | 4 | 5 | 4* | — | — |
| 330 | Wizzard | "See My Baby Jive" | 4 | 2 | 3* | — | — |
| 331 | Suzi Quatro | "Can the Can" | 1 | 3 | 3 | — | — |
| 332 | 10cc | "Rubber Bullets" | 1 | 1 | 1 | — | — |
| 333 | Slade | "Skweeze Me Pleeze Me" | 3 | 2 | 2 | — | — |
| 334 | Peters and Lee | "Welcome Home" | 1 | 2 | 1 | — | — |
| 335 | Gary Glitter | "I'm the Leader of the Gang (I Am!)" | 4 | 3 | 3 | — | — |
| — | The Carpenters | "Yesterday Once More" | No | No | 3 | — | — |
| 336 | Donny Osmond | "Young Love" | 4 | 2 | 1 | — | — |
| — | Barry Blue | "Dancin' (on a Saturday Night)" | No | No | 3 | — | — |
| 337 | Wizzard | "Angel Fingers (A Teen Ballad)" | 1 | 1 | 1 | — | — |
| — | David Essex | "Rock On" | No | 1 | No | — | — |
| — | Sweet | "The Ballroom Blitz" | No | 1 | 1 | — | — |
| 338 | Simon Park Orchestra | "Eye Level (Theme From The Thames TV Series "Van Der Valk")" | 4 | 4 | 4 | — | — |
| 339 | David Cassidy | "Daydreamer" / "The Puppy Song" | 3 | 2 | 3 | — | — |
| — | The Osmonds | "Let Me In" | No | 1 | No | — | — |
| 340 | Gary Glitter | "I Love You Love Me Love" | 4 | 4 | 4 | — | — |
| 341 | Slade | "Merry Xmas Everybody" | 5 | 2 | 3 | — | — |
| 342 | New Seekers feat. Lyn Paul | "You Won't Find Another Fool Like Me" | 1 | 2 | No | — | — |
| — | Leo Sayer | "The Show Must Go On" | No | 1 | 3 | — | — |
| — | Sweet | "Teenage Rampage" | No | 1 | No | — | — |
| 343 | Mud | "Tiger Feet" | 4 | 3 | 3 | — | — |
| 344 | Suzi Quatro | "Devil Gate Drive" | 2 | 2 | 3 | — | — |
| 345 | Alvin Stardust | "Jealous Mind" | 1 | 2 | 1 | — | — |
| 346 | Paper Lace | "Billy Don't Be a Hero" | 3 | 3 | 3 | — | — |
| 347 | Terry Jacks | "Seasons in the Sun" | 4 | 2 | 3 | — | — |
| — | Mud | "The Cat Crept In" | No | 1 | 1 | — | — |
| 348 | ABBA | "Waterloo" | 2 | 2 | 3 | — | — |
| 349 | The Rubettes | "Sugar Baby Love" | 4 | 4 | 2 | — | — |
| — | R. Dean Taylor | "There's a Ghost in My House" | No | No | 1 | — | — |
| — | Showaddywaddy | "Hey Rock and Roll" | No | No | 1 | — | — |
| 350 | Ray Stevens | "The Streak" | 1 | 2 | 1 | — | — |
| 351 | Gary Glitter | "Always Yours" | 1 | 1 | 1 | — | — |
| 352 | Charles Aznavour | "She" | 4 | 3 | 4 | — | — |
| 353 | George McCrae | "Rock Your Baby" | 3 | 3 | 2 | — | — |
| 354 | The Three Degrees | "When Will I See You Again" | 2 | 3 | 3 | — | — |
| — | Donny and Marie Osmond | "I'm Leaving It (All) Up to You" | No | No | 1 | — | — |
| 355 | The Osmonds | "Love Me for a Reason" | 3 | 2 | 1 | — | — |
| 356 | Carl Douglas | "Kung Fu Fighting" | 3 | 4 | 2 | — | — |
| 357 | John Denver | "Annie's Song" | 1 | No | 1 | — | — |
| — | Peter Shelley | "Gee Baby" | No | 1 | No | — | — |
| 358 | Sweet Sensation | "Sad Sweet Dreamer" | 1 | No | 2 | — | — |
| 359 | Ken Boothe | "Everything I Own" | 3 | 2 | 3 | — | — |
| — | Queen | "Killer Queen" | No | No | 2 | — | — |
| 360 | David Essex | "Gonna Make You a Star" | 3 | 5 | 1 | — | — |
| — | Gary Glitter | "Oh Yes! You're Beautiful" | No | No | 1 | — | — |
| 361 | Barry White | "You're the First, the Last, My Everything" | 2 | 1 | 1 | — | — |
| 362 | Mud | "Lonely This Christmas" | 4 | 3 | 3 | — | — |
| 363 | Status Quo | "Down Down" | 1 | 1 | 1 | — | — |
| — | Ralph McTell | "Streets of London" | No | 2 | 1 | — | — |
| 364 | The Tymes | "Ms Grace" | 1 | 1 | 2 | — | — |
| 365 | Pilot | "January" | 3 | 2 | 2 | — | — |
| — | The Carpenters | "Please Mr. Postman" | No | 1 | No | — | — |
| 366 | Steve Harley & Cockney Rebel | "Make Me Smile (Come Up and See Me)" | 2 | 1 | 2 | — | — |
| 367 | Telly Savalas | "If" | 2 | 2 | 2 | — | — |
| 368 | Bay City Rollers | "Bye Bye Baby" | 6 | 6 | 6 | — | — |
| — | Bobby Goldsboro | "Honey" | No | 1 | 1 | — | — |
| 369 | Mud | "Oh Boy" | 2 | No | No | — | — |
| — | Minnie Riperton | "Lovin' You" | No | 1 | 2 | — | — |
| 370 | Tammy Wynette | "Stand by Your Man" | 3 | 3 | 3 | — | — |
| 371 | Windsor Davies and Don Estelle | "Whispering Grass" | 3 | 2 | 2 | — | — |
| — | Showaddywaddy | "Three Steps to Heaven" | No | 1 | No | — | — |
| 372 | 10cc | "I'm Not in Love" | 2 | 2 | 3 | — | — |
| 373 | Johnny Nash | "Tears on My Pillow" | 1 | 2 | 1 | — | — |
| 374 | Bay City Rollers | "Give a Little Love" | 3 | 1 | 1 | — | — |
| 375 | Typically Tropical | "Barbados" | 1 | 2 | 2 | — | — |
| 376 | The Stylistics | "Can't Give You Anything (But My Love)" | 3 | 2 | 3 | — | — |
| 377 | Rod Stewart | "Sailing" | 4 | 4 | 4 | — | — |
| — | Leo Sayer | "Moonlighting" | No | 3 | No | — | — |
| 378 | David Essex | "Hold Me Close" | 3 | 3 | 3 | — | — |
| 379 | Art Garfunkel | "I Only Have Eyes for You" | 2 | 2 | 1 | — | — |
| 380 | David Bowie | "Space Oddity" | 2 | 2 | 4 | — | — |
| 381 | Billy Connolly | "D.I.V.O.R.C.E." | 1 | 1 | No | — | — |
| — | Hot Chocolate | "You Sexy Thing" | No | 1 | 1 | — | — |
| 382 | Queen | "Bohemian Rhapsody" | 9 | 6 | 7 | — | — |
| — | Sailor | "A Glass of Champagne" | No | 1 | No | — | — |
| 383 | ABBA | "Mamma Mia" | 2 | 2 | 3 | — | — |
| 384 | Slik | "Forever and Ever" | 1 | 1 | 2 | — | — |
| 385 | The Four Seasons | "December, 1963 (Oh, What a Night)" | 2 | 2 | No | — | — |
| — | Manuel and the Music of the Mountains | "Rodrigo's Guitar Concerto de Aranjuez" | No | No | 1 | — | — |
| 386 | Tina Charles | "I Love to Love (But My Baby Loves to Dance)" | 3 | 3 | 4 | — | — |
| 387 | Brotherhood of Man | "Save Your Kisses for Me" | 6 | 5 | 4 | — | — |
| 388 | ABBA | "Fernando" | 4 | 6 | 5 | — | — |
| 389 | J. J. Barrie | "No Charge" | 1 | 1 | 1 | — | — |
| 390 | The Wurzels | "The Combine Harvester (Brand New Key)" | 2 | No | 1 | — | — |
| — | Wings | "Silly Love Songs" | No | 1 | No | — | — |
| 391 | Real Thing | "You to Me Are Everything" | 3 | 2 | 3 | — | — |
| — | Candi Staton | "Young Hearts Run Free" | No | 1 | 2 | — | — |
| 392 | Demis Roussos | "Excerpts From "The Roussos Phenomenon" (EP)" | 1 | 1 | 1 | — | — |
| 393 | Elton John & Kiki Dee | "Don't Go Breaking My Heart" | 6 | 7 | 5 | — | — |
| — | Wings | "Let 'Em In" | No | No | 1 | — | — |
| 394 | ABBA | "Dancing Queen" | 6 | 5 | 4 | — | — |
| — | Real Thing | "Can't Get By Without You" | No | No | 1 | — | — |
| 395 | Pussycat | "Mississippi" | 4 | 3 | 2 | — | — |
| 396 | Chicago | "If You Leave Me Now" | 3 | 4 | 6 | — | — |
| 397 | Showaddywaddy | "Under the Moon of Love" | 3 | 3 | 3 | — | — |
| 398 | Johnny Mathis | "When a Child Is Born (Soleado)" | 3 | 3 | 3 | — | — |
| 399 | David Soul | "Don't Give Up on Us" | 4 | 3 | 1 | — | — |
| 400 | Julie Covington | "Don't Cry for Me Argentina" | 1 | 3 | 2 | — | — |
| 401 | Leo Sayer | "When I Need You" | 3 | 2 | 4 | — | — |
| — | Heatwave | "Boogie Nights" | No | No | 1 | — | — |
| 402 | The Manhattan Transfer | "Chanson D'Amour" | 3 | 2 | 2 | — | — |
| 403 | ABBA | "Knowing Me, Knowing You" | 5 | 6 | 4 | — | — |
| — | David Soul | "Going In With My Eyes Open" | No | No | 1 | — | — |
| 404 | Deniece Williams | "Free" | 2 | 3 | 1 | — | — |
| 405 | Rod Stewart | "I Don't Want to Talk About It" / "The First Cut Is the Deepest" | 4 | 3 | 5 | — | — |
| — | Joe Tex | "Ain't Gonna Bump No More (With No Big Fat Woman)" | No | No | 1 | — | — |
| — | Sex Pistols | "God Save the Queen" | No | 1 | No | — | — |
| 406 | Kenny Rogers | "Lucille" | 1 | No | No | — | — |
| 407 | The Jacksons | "Show You the Way to Go" | 1 | 2 | 2 | — | — |
| 408 | Hot Chocolate | "So You Win Again" | 3 | 1 | 2 | — | — |
| — | Boney M. | "Ma Baker" | No | 1 | No | — | — |
| 409 | Donna Summer | "I Feel Love" | 4 | 5 | 5 | — | — |
| 410 | Brotherhood of Man | "Angelo" | 1 | 1 | No | — | — |
| 411 | The Floaters | "Float On" | 1 | No | 2 | — | — |
| — | Space | "Magic Fly" | No | 3 | 3 | — | — |
| — | Jean-Michel Jarre | "Oxygène (Part IV)" | No | No | 1 | — | — |
| 412 | Elvis Presley | "Way Down" | 5 | 3 | 1 | — | — |
| 413 | David Soul | "Silver Lady" | 3 | 1 | No | — | — |
| — | La Belle Epoque | "Black Is Black" | No | No | 2 | — | — |
| 414 | Baccara | "Yes Sir, I Can Boogie" | 1 | 1 | No | — | — |
| — | Rod Stewart | "You're in My Heart" | No | 1 | 2 | — | — |
| 415 | ABBA | "The Name of the Game" | 4 | 2 | 2 | — | — |
| — | Status Quo | "Rockin' All Over the World" | No | 1 | 1 | — | — |
| 416 | Wings | "Mull of Kintyre" / "Girls' School" | 9 | 9 | 8 | — | — |
| 417 | Althea & Donna | "Uptown Top Ranking" | 1 | 2 | 3 | — | — |
| 418 | Brotherhood of Man | "Figaro" | 2 | No | No | — | — |
| 419 | ABBA | "Take a Chance on Me" | 3 | 3 | 3 | — | — |
| — | Rose Royce | "Wishing on a Star" | No | No | 1 | — | — |
| 420 | Kate Bush | "Wuthering Heights" | 4 | 3 | 1 | — | — |
| — | Blondie | "Denis" | No | 2 | 3 | — | — |
| 421 | Brian and Michael | "Matchstalk Men & Matchstalk Cats & Dogs (Lowry's Song)" | 3 | No | No | — | — |
| — | Showaddywaddy | "I Wonder Why" | No | 1 | 2 | — | — |
| 422 | Bee Gees | "Night Fever" | 2 | 4 | 3 | — | — |
| 423 | Boney M. | "Rivers of Babylon" | 5 | 4 | 4 | — | — |
| 424 | John Travolta and Olivia Newton-John | "You're the One That I Want" | 9 | 10 | 9 | — | — |
| 425 | Commodores | "Three Times a Lady" | 5 | 4 | 6 | — | — |
| 426 | 10cc | "Dreadlock Holiday" | 1 | 2 | No | — | — |
| 427 | John Travolta and Olivia Newton-John | "Summer Nights" | 7 | 6 | 6 | — | — |
| — | John Travolta | "Sandy" | No | No | 1 | — | — |
| 428 | The Boomtown Rats | "Rat Trap" | 2 | 3 | 2 | — | — |
| 429 | Rod Stewart | "Da Ya Think I'm Sexy?" | 1 | 1 | 2 | — | — |
| 430 | Boney M. | "Mary's Boy Child – Oh My Lord" | 4 | 4 | 4 | — | — |
| 431 | Village People | "Y.M.C.A." | 3 | 3 | 1 | — | — |
| 432 | Ian Dury and The Blockheads | "Hit Me with Your Rhythm Stick" | 1 | 2 | 2 | — | — |
| 433 | Blondie | "Heart of Glass" | 4 | 3 | 4 | — | — |
| — | ABBA | "Chiquitita" | No | 1 | No | — | — |
| 434 | Bee Gees | "Tragedy" | 2 | 1 | 1 | — | — |
| — | Elvis Costello | "Oliver's Army" | No | 1 | 1 | — | — |
| 435 | Gloria Gaynor | "I Will Survive" | 4 | 2 | 4 | — | — |
| — | Village People | "In the Navy" | No | 1 | No | — | — |
| 436 | Art Garfunkel | "Bright Eyes" | 6 | 6 | 5 | — | — |
| — | M | "Pop Muzik" | No | 1 | 1 | — | — |
| 437 | Blondie | "Sunday Girl" | 3 | 1 | 2 | — | — |
| — | Roxy Music | "Dance Away" | No | 1 | 1 | — | — |
| 438 | Anita Ward | "Ring My Bell" | 2 | 3 | 2 | — | — |
| 439 | Tubeway Army | "Are "Friends" Electric?" | 4 | 3 | 3 | — | — |
| — | Janet Kay | "Silly Games" | No | 1 | 1 | — | — |
| 440 | The Boomtown Rats | "I Don't Like Mondays" | 4 | 4 | 5 | — | — |
| 441 | Cliff Richard | "We Don't Talk Anymore" | 4 | 3 | 3 | — | — |
| 442 | Gary Numan | "Cars" | 1 | 2 | 2 | — | — |
| 443 | The Police | "Message in a Bottle" | 3 | 2 | 2 | — | — |
| 444 | The Buggles | "Video Killed the Radio Star" | 1 | 2 | 2 | — | — |
| 445 | Lena Martell | "One Day at a Time" | 3 | 1 | No | — | — |
| 446 | Dr. Hook | "When You're in Love with a Beautiful Woman" | 3 | 4 | 2 | — | — |
| — | The Jam | "The Eton Rifles" | No | No | 1 | — | — |
| 447 | The Police | "Walking on the Moon" | 1 | 1 | 2 | — | — |
| 448 | Pink Floyd | "Another Brick in the Wall (Part II)" | 5 | 4 | 4 | — | — |
| 449 | Pretenders | "Brass in Pocket" | 2 | 2 | 2 | — | — |
| — | Madness | "My Girl" | No | 1 | 1 | — | — |
| 450 | The Special A.K.A. feat. Rico | "Too Much Too Young" (Note: This number-one record was not a single but a five-track extended play (EP) with "Too Much Too Young" as the lead track. The rules now require at most four distinct songs to be eligible for the UK Singles Chart. Although the EP is credited to The Special A.K.A. on the record sleeve the record label credits The Specials.) | 2 | 1 | 2 | — | — |
| 451 | Kenny Rogers | "Coward of the County" | 2 | 2 | 1 | — | — |
| 452 | Blondie | "Atomic" | 2 | 3 | 3 | — | — |
| 453 | Fern Kinney | "Together We Are Beautiful" | 1 | 1 | 1 | — | — |
| 454 | The Jam | "Going Underground" / "Dreams of Children" | 3 | 2 | 3 | — | — |
| 455 | The Detroit Spinners | "Working My Way Back to You – Forgive Me Girl" | 2 | No | 1 | — | — |
| — | Liquid Gold | "Dance Yourself Dizzy" | No | 2 | No | — | — |
| 456 | Blondie | "Call Me" | 1 | 2 | 1 | — | — |
| 457 | Dexys Midnight Runners | "Geno" | 2 | 1 | 3 | — | — |
| 458 | Johnny Logan | "What's Another Year" | 2 | 2 | 1 | — | — |
| — | Hot Chocolate | "No Doubt About It" | No | 1 | No | — | — |
| 459 | The Mash | "Theme from M*A*S*H (Suicide is Painless)" | 3 | 2 | 4 | — | — |
| — | Lipps Inc | "Funkytown" | No | 1 | No | — | — |
| 460 | Don McLean | "Crying" | 3 | 2 | 1 | — | — |
| — | Splodgenessabounds | "Two Pints of Lager and a Packet of Crisps Please" | No | No | 1 | — | — |
| 461 | Olivia Newton-John and the Electric Light Orchestra | "Xanadu" | 2 | 3 | 2 | — | — |
| 462 | Odyssey | "Use It Up and Wear It Out" | 2 | 1 | 2 | — | — |
| — | Diana Ross | "Upside Down" | No | 1 | 1 | — | — |
| 463 | ABBA | "The Winner Takes It All" | 2 | 2 | 2 | — | — |
| 464 | David Bowie | "Ashes to Ashes" | 2 | 2 | 2 | — | — |
| 465 | The Jam | "Start!" | 1 | 1 | 1 | — | — |
| 466 | Kelly Marie | "Feels Like I'm in Love" | 2 | No | No | — | — |
| — | Randy Crawford | "One Day I'll Fly Away" | No | 2 | 2 | — | — |
| 467 | The Police | "Don't Stand So Close to Me" | 4 | 4 | 4 | — | — |
| 468 | Barbra Streisand | "Woman in Love" | 3 | 3 | 2 | — | — |
| 469 | Blondie | "The Tide Is High" | 2 | 2 | 2 | — | — |
| 470 | ABBA | "Super Trouper" | 3 | 2 | 2 | — | — |
| 471 | John Lennon | "(Just Like) Starting Over" | 1 | 1 | 1 | — | — |
| — | Jona Lewie | "Stop the Cavalry" | No | 2 | 3 | — | — |
| 472 | St Winifred's School Choir | "There's No One Quite Like Grandma" | 2 | No | No | — | — |
| 473 | John Lennon | "Imagine" | 4 | 4 | 1 | — | — |
| — | Adam and the Ants | "Antmusic" | No | No | 1 | — | — |
| — | Phil Collins | "In the Air Tonight" | No | 2 | 2 | — | — |
| 474 | John Lennon | "Woman" | 1 | No | No | — | — |
| — | Ultravox | "Vienna" | No | 1 | 2 | — | — |
| 475 | Joe Dolce Music Theatre | "Shaddap You Face" | 3 | 2 | 2 | — | — |
| 476 | Roxy Music | "Jealous Guy" | 2 | 2 | 2 | — | — |
| — | Kim Wilde | "Kids in America" | No | No | 1 | — | — |
| 477 | Shakin' Stevens | "This Ole House" | 3 | 3 | 2 | — | — |
| 478 | Bucks Fizz | "Making Your Mind Up" | 3 | 2 | 2 | — | — |
| — | Ennio Morricone | "Chi Mai (Theme from The Life and Times of David Lloyd George)" | No | 1 | 1 | — | — |
| — | Starsound | "Stars on 45" | No | 1 | 1 | — | — |
| 479 | Adam and the Ants | "Stand and Deliver" | 3 | 2 | 2 | — | — |
| — | Shakin' Stevens | "You Drive Me Crazy" | No | No | 1 | — | — |
| 480 | Smokey Robinson | "Being with You" | 2 | 2 | 3 | — | — |
| 481 | Michael Jackson | "One Day In Your Life" | 2 | 3 | 1 | — | — |
| 482 | The Specials | "Ghost Town" | 3 | 2 | 3 | — | — |
| — | Spandau Ballet | "Chant No. 1 (I Don't Need This Pressure On)" | No | 1 | No | — | — |
| 483 | Shakin' Stevens | "Green Door" | 4 | 3 | 2 | — | — |
| — | Stevie Wonder | "Happy Birthday" | No | 1 | 1 | — | — |
| — | Royal Philharmonic Orchestra | "Hooked on Classics" | No | No | 1 | — | — |
| 484 | Aneka | "Japanese Boy" | 1 | 1 | 1 | — | — |
| 485 | Soft Cell | "Tainted Love" | 2 | 1 | 2 | — | — |
| 486 | Adam and the Ants | "Prince Charming" | 4 | 5 | 3 | — | — |
| — | The Police | "Invisible Sun" | No | No | 1 | — | — |
| 487 | Dave Stewart and Barbara Gaskin | "It's My Party" | 4 | 2 | 3 | — | — |
| — | Altered Images | "Happy Birthday" | No | 1 | 1 | — | — |
| 488 | The Police | "Every Little Thing She Does Is Magic" | 1 | 2 | 1 | — | — |
| 489 | Queen and David Bowie | "Under Pressure" | 2 | 2 | 3 | — | — |
| 490 | Julio Iglesias | "Begin The Beguine (Volver A Empezar)" | 1 | 1 | 1 | — | — |
| 491 | The Human League | "Don't You Want Me" | 5 | 3 | 5 | — | — |
| — | ABBA | "One of Us" | No | 1 | No | — | — |
| 492 | Bucks Fizz | "The Land of Make Believe" | 2 | 2 | 1 | — | — |
| 493 | Shakin' Stevens | "Oh Julie" | 1 | No | No | — | — |
| 494 | Kraftwerk | "Computer Love" / "The Model" | 1 | 4 | 3 | — | — |
| — | The Stranglers | "Golden Brown" | No | No | 1 | — | — |
| 495 | The Jam | "Town Called Malice" / "Precious" | 3 | 3 | 3 | — | — |
| 496 | Tight Fit | "The Lion Sleeps Tonight" | 3 | 4 | 7 | — | — |
| 497 | Goombay Dance Band | "Seven Tears" | 3 | 2 | 2 | — | — |
| — | Imagination | "Just an Illusion" | No | No | 1 | — | — |
| 498 | Bucks Fizz | "My Camera Never Lies" | 1 | 2 | No | — | — |
| — | Chas & Dave | "Ain't No Pleasing You" | No | No | 1 | — | — |
| 499 | Paul McCartney and Stevie Wonder | "Ebony and Ivory" | 3 | 2 | 4 | — | — |
| — | Ph.D. | "I Won't Let You Down" | No | 1 | No | — | — |
| 500 | Nicole | "A Little Peace" | 2 | 1 | 1 | — | — |
| — | Yazoo | "Only You" | No | No | 1 | — | — |
| 501 | Madness | "House of Fun" | 2 | 2 | 2 | — | — |
| 502 | Adam Ant | "Goody Two Shoes" | 2 | 3 | 1 | — | — |
| — | Soft Cell | "Torch" | No | No | 1 | — | — |
| 503 | Charlene | "I've Never Been to Me" | 1 | 1 | 1 | — | — |
| 504 | Captain Sensible | "Happy Talk" | 2 | 1 | 1 | — | — |
| — | Steve Miller Band | "Abracadabra" | No | 1 | No | — | — |
| 505 | Irene Cara | "Fame" | 3 | 2 | 3 | — | — |
| 506 | Dexys Midnight Runners and the Emerald Express | "Come On Eileen" | 4 | 4 | 4 | — | — |
| 507 | Survivor | "Eye of the Tiger" | 4 | 3 | 2 | — | — |
| — | Dire Straits | "Private Investigations" | No | 1 | 2 | — | — |
| — | The Jam | "The Bitterest Pill" | No | 1 | 1 | — | — |
| 508 | Musical Youth | "Pass the Dutchie" | 3 | 2 | 2 | — | — |
| 509 | Culture Club | "Do You Really Want to Hurt Me" | 3 | 3 | 3 | — | — |
| 510 | Eddy Grant | "I Don't Wanna Dance" | 3 | 2 | 3 | — | — |
| — | Dionne Warwick | "Heartbreaker" | No | 1 | No | — | — |
| — | The Human League | "Mirror Man" | No | 1 | 1 | — | — |
| 511 | The Jam | "Beat Surrender" | 3 | 2 | 3 | — | — |
| 512 | Renée and Renato | "Save Your Love" (Note: The first three weeks of this record's number-one run was from the last three charts compiled by the BMRB; its last week at number one was from the first chart compiled by Gallup. Its run is thus divided accordingly.) | 3 | 1 | No | — | 1 |
| — | Culture Club | "Time (Clock of the Heart)" | No | 2 | No | — | No |
| 513 | Phil Collins | "You Can't Hurry Love" | — | 2 | 3 | — | 2 |
| 514 | Men at Work | "Down Under" | — | 3 | 3 | — | 3 |
| — | Tears for Fears | "Change" | — | No | 1 | — | No |
| 515 | Kajagoogoo | "Too Shy" | — | 2 | 1 | — | 2 |
| 516 | Michael Jackson | "Billie Jean" | — | 2 | 2 | — | 1 |
| 517 | Bonnie Tyler | "Total Eclipse of the Heart" | — | 2 | 2 | — | 2 |
| — | The Style Council | "Speak Like a Child" | — | No | 1 | — | No |
| 518 | Duran Duran | "Is There Something I Should Know?" | — | 2 | 1 | — | 2 |
| 519 | David Bowie | "Let's Dance" | — | 3 | 4 | — | 3 |
| 520 | Spandau Ballet | "True" | — | 2 | 3 | — | 4 |
| — | Heaven 17 | "Temptation" | — | No | 1 | — | No |
| 521 | New Edition | "Candy Girl" | — | No | 1 | — | 2 |
| 522 | The Police | "Every Breath You Take" | — | 3 | 3 | — | 4 |
| — | David Bowie | "China Girl" | — | 1 | 1 | — | No |
| 523 | Rod Stewart | "Baby Jane" | — | 1 | 2 | — | 3 |
| 524 | Paul Young | "Wherever I Lay My Hat (That's My Home)" | — | 5 | 4 | — | 3 |
| — | Freeez | "I.O.U." | — | No | 1 | — | No |
| 525 | KC and the Sunshine Band | "Give It Up" | — | 1 | 1 | — | 3 |
| — | Spandau Ballet | "Gold" | — | 2 | 2 | — | No |
| 526 | UB40 | "Red Red Wine" | — | 3 | 3 | — | 2 |
| 527 | Culture Club | "Karma Chameleon" | — | 6 | 6 | — | 6 |
| — | Lionel Richie | "All Night Long (All Night)" | — | No | 1 | — | No |
| 528 | Billy Joel | "Uptown Girl" | — | 3 | 2 | — | 5 |
| — | Paul McCartney and Michael Jackson | "Say Say Say" | — | No | 1 | — | No |
| — | The Assembly | "Never Never" | — | 1 | 1 | — | No |
| — | Paul Young | "Love of the Common People" | — | 1 | No | — | No |
| 529 | The Flying Pickets | "Only You" | — | 5 | 5 | — | 5 |
| 530 | Paul McCartney | "Pipes of Peace" | — | 1 | 1 | — | 2 |
| 531 | Frankie Goes to Hollywood | "Relax" | — | 4 | 6 | — | 5 |
| — | Queen | "Radio Ga Ga" | — | 1 | No | — | No |
| 532 | Nena | "99 Red Balloons" | — | 4 | 3 | — | 3 |
| 533 | Lionel Richie | "Hello" | — | 5 | 5 | — | 6 |
| — | Phil Collins | "Against All Odds (Take a Look at Me Now)" | — | 1 | 4 | — | No |
| 534 | Duran Duran | "The Reflex" | — | 2 | No | — | 4 |
| — | The Pointer Sisters | "Automatic" | — | 2 | 1 | — | No |
| 535 | Wham! | "Wake Me Up Before You Go-Go" | — | 2 | 3 | — | 2 |
| 536 | Frankie Goes to Hollywood | "Two Tribes" | — | 8 | 7 | — | 9 |
| 537 | George Michael | "Careless Whisper" | — | 3 | 4 | — | 3 |
| 538 | Stevie Wonder | "I Just Called to Say I Love You" | — | 6 | 5 | — | 6 |
| — | Culture Club | "The War Song" | — | 1 | 1 | — | No |
| 539 | Wham! | "Freedom" | — | 3 | 3 | — | 3 |
| 540 | Chaka Khan | "I Feel for You" | — | 3 | 4 | — | 3 |
| 541 | Jim Diamond | "I Should Have Known Better" | — | 1 | No | — | 1 |
| 542 | Frankie Goes to Hollywood | "The Power of Love" | — | No | 1 | — | 1 |
| 543 | Band Aid | "Do They Know It's Christmas?" | — | 5 | 5 | — | 5 |
| — | Wham! | "Everything She Wants" / "Last Christmas" (Note: "Last Christmas" peaked at number two in the official UK Singles Chart on its original release in December 1984, but eventually reached number one on the chart week ending 7 January 2021.) | — | 1 | 1 | — | No |
| 544 | Foreigner | "I Want to Know What Love Is" | — | 2 | 1 | — | 3 |
| — | Prince | "1999" | — | No | 1 | — | No |
| 545 | Elaine Paige and Barbara Dickson | "I Know Him So Well" | — | 2 | 1 | — | 4 |
| — | King | "Love and Pride" | — | 1 | 2 | — | No |
| 546 | Dead or Alive | "You Spin Me Round (Like a Record)" | — | 2 | 3 | — | 2 |
| 547 | Philip Bailey (duet with Phil Collins) | "Easy Lover" | — | 3 | 4 | — | 4 |
| — | Frankie Goes to Hollywood | "Welcome to the Pleasuredome" | — | 1 | No | — | No |
| 548 | USA for Africa | "We Are the World" | — | No | No | — | 2 |
| — | Tears for Fears | "Everybody Wants to Rule the World" | — | 3 | 4 | — | No |
| 549 | Phyllis Nelson | "Move Closer" | — | 1 | 1 | — | 1 |
| 550 | Paul Hardcastle | "19" | — | 5 | 5 | — | 5 |
| 551 | The Crowd | "You'll Never Walk Alone" | — | 1 | 2 | — | 2 |
| — | Madonna | "Crazy for You" | — | 1 | 1 | — | No |
| 552 | Sister Sledge | "Frankie" | — | 3 | 1 | — | 4 |
| — | Harold Faltermeyer | "Axel F" | — | No | 2 | — | No |
| 553 | Eurythmics | "There Must Be an Angel (Playing with My Heart)" | — | 2 | 1 | — | 1 |
| 554 | Madonna | "Into the Groove" | — | 4 | 5 | — | 4 |
| 555 | UB40 and Chrissie Hynde | "I Got You Babe" | — | 1 | No | — | 1 |
| 556 | David Bowie and Mick Jagger | "Dancing in the Street" | — | 3 | 5 | — | 4 |
| 557 | Midge Ure | "If I Was" | — | 1 | No | — | 1 |
| 558 | Jennifer Rush | "The Power of Love" | — | 4 | 3 | — | 5 |
| — | a-ha | "Take On Me" | — | 1 | 2 | — | No |
| — | Elton John | "Nikita" | — | 1 | No | — | No |
| 559 | Feargal Sharkey | "A Good Heart" | — | 2 | 2 | — | 2 |
| 560 | Wham! | "I'm Your Man" | — | 2 | 2 | — | 2 |
| 561 | Whitney Houston | "Saving All My Love for You" | — | 3 | 4 | — | 2 |
| 562 | Shakin' Stevens | "Merry Christmas Everyone" | — | No | No | — | 2 |
| 563 | Pet Shop Boys | "West End Girls" | — | 2 | 2 | — | 2 |
| 564 | a-ha | "The Sun Always Shines on T.V." | — | 3 | 2 | — | 2 |
| — | Nana Mouskouri | "Only Love" | — | No | 1 | — | No |
| 565 | Billy Ocean | "When the Going Gets Tough, the Tough Get Going" | — | 4 | 3 | — | 4 |
| 566 | Diana Ross | "Chain Reaction" | — | 2 | 3 | — | 3 |
| — | David Bowie | "Absolute Beginners" | — | 1 | No | — | No |
| 567 | Cliff Richard and The Young Ones | "Living Doll" | — | 3 | 3 | — | 3 |
| 568 | George Michael | "A Different Corner" | — | 3 | 3 | — | 3 |
| — | Janet Jackson | "What Have You Done for Me Lately" | — | No | 1 | — | No |
| 569 | Falco | "Rock Me Amadeus" | — | 1 | No | — | 1 |
| — | Patti LaBelle and Michael McDonald | "On My Own" | — | No | 1 | — | No |
| 570 | Spitting Image | "The Chicken Song" | — | 2 | 1 | — | 3 |
| — | Peter Gabriel | "Sledgehammer" | — | No | 2 | — | No |
| 571 | Doctor and the Medics | "Spirit in the Sky" | — | 4 | No | — | 3 |
| — | Simply Red | "Holding Back the Years" | — | No | 1 | — | No |
| — | Nu Shooz | "I Can't Wait" | — | No | 1 | — | No |
| 572 | Wham! | "The Edge of Heaven" | — | 1 | 2 | — | 2 |
| 573 | Madonna | "Papa Don't Preach" | — | 3 | 3 | — | 3 |
| 574 | Chris de Burgh | "The Lady in Red" | — | 2 | 1 | — | 3 |
| 575 | Boris Gardiner | "I Want to Wake Up with You" | — | 3 | 2 | — | 3 |
| 576 | The Communards | "Don't Leave Me This Way" | — | 5 | 5 | — | 4 |
| 577 | Madonna | "True Blue" | — | 1 | 1 | — | 1 |
| 578 | Nick Berry | "Every Loser Wins" | — | 3 | 3 | — | 3 |
| 579 | Berlin | "Take My Breath Away (Love Theme from Top Gun)" | — | 3 | 5 | — | 4 |
| 580 | Europe | "The Final Countdown" | — | 3 | No | — | 2 |
| — | Erasure | "Sometimes" | — | No | 1 | — | No |
| 581 | The Housemartins | "Caravan of Love" | — | 3 | 3 | — | 1 |
| 582 | Jackie Wilson | "Reet Petite (The Sweetest Girl in Town)" | — | 3 | 2 | — | 4 |
| 583 | Steve "Silk" Hurley | "Jack Your Body" (Note: "Jack Your Body" was released on a 12" single that was over 25 minutes long, exceededing the maximum time for a record to be classified as a single. The track should have been classified as an album instead (as it was in NME) and, during the two weeks it spent at number one, "Reet Petite" would have been number one for a fifth week and "I Knew You Were Waiting (For Me)" would have become number one a week earlier.) | — | No | 2 | — | 2 |
| — | Robbie Nevil | "C'est La Vie" | — | 1 | No | — | No |
| 584 | Aretha Franklin and George Michael | "I Knew You Were Waiting (For Me)" | — | 3 | 3 | — | 2 |
| 585 | Ben E. King | "Stand by Me" | — | 3 | 3 | — | 3 |
| 586 | Boy George | "Everything I Own" | — | 1 | 1 | — | 2 |
| 587 | Mel and Kim | "Respectable" | — | 1 | 2 | — | 1 |
| 588 | Ferry Aid | "Let It Be" | — | 2 | 3 | — | 3 |
| — | Club Nouveau | "Lean on Me" | — | No | 1 | — | No |
| 589 | Madonna | "La Isla Bonita" | — | 3 | 1 | — | 2 |
| — | Judy Boucher | "Can't Be with You Tonight" | — | No | 1 | — | No |
| 590 | Starship | "Nothing's Gonna Stop Us Now" | — | 3 | 3 | — | 4 |
| 591 | Whitney Houston | "I Wanna Dance with Somebody (Who Loves Me)" | — | 3 | 3 | — | 2 |
| 592 | The Firm | "Star Trekkin'" | — | 2 | 1 | — | 2 |
| 593 | Pet Shop Boys | "It's a Sin" | — | 3 | 3 | — | 3 |
| 594 | Madonna | "Who's That Girl" | — | 1 | 2 | — | 1 |
| 595 | Los Lobos | "La Bamba" | — | 2 | 1 | — | 2 |
| 596 | Michael Jackson and Siedah Garrett | "I Just Can't Stop Loving You" | — | 3 | 2 | — | 2 |
| 597 | Rick Astley | "Never Gonna Give You Up" | — | 4 | 4 | — | 5 |
| 598 | MARRS | "Pump Up the Volume" / "Anitina (The First Time I See She Dance)" | — | 2 | 3 | — | 2 |
| — | Abigail Mead and Nigel Goulding | "I Want to Be Your Drill Instructor" | — | 1 | No | — | No |
| 599 | Bee Gees | "You Win Again" | — | 3 | 3 | — | 4 |
| — | George Michael | "Faith" | — | 1 | 2 | — | No |
| 600 | T'Pau | "China in Your Hand" | — | 3 | 4 | — | 5 |
| — | Rick Astley | "When I Fall in Love" | — | 3 | 3 | — | No |
| 601 | Pet Shop Boys | "Always on My Mind" | — | 3 | 1 | — | 4 |
| 602 | Belinda Carlisle | "Heaven Is a Place on Earth" | — | 2 | 2 | — | 2 |
| 603 | Tiffany | "I Think We're Alone Now" | — | 2 | 3 | — | 3 |
| 604 | Kylie Minogue | "I Should Be So Lucky" | — | 2 | 2 | — | 5 |
| — | Bomb the Bass | "Beat Dis" | — | 1 | 1 | — | No |
| — | Rick Astley | "Together Forever" | — | 1 | 2 | — | No |
| 605 | Aswad | "Don't Turn Around" | — | 3 | 3 | — | 2 |
| 606 | Pet Shop Boys | "Heart" | — | 2 | 2 | — | 3 |
| 607 | S-Express | "Theme from S-Express" | — | 2 | 1 | — | 2 |
| 608 | Fairground Attraction | "Perfect" | — | 1 | 2 | — | 1 |
