= List of Melody Maker number-one singles of the 1980s =

Melody Maker was a British weekly pop music newspaper which was published between 1926 and 2000. Melody Maker was the third publication (after NME, or New Musical Express, in 1952, and Record Mirror in 1955) to publish a weekly record chart. NME is now regarded as the "canonical" source for record charts by the Official Charts Company in the period up to 10 March 1960; after that, when Record Retailer began compiling a chart, the Official Charts Company and Guinness' British Hit Singles & Albums cited them as the canonical source for the British singles chart. Prior to 15 February 1969, when the British Market Research Bureau (BMRB) chart was established as part of a joint commission by Record Retailer and the BBC, there was no one universally accepted or official source and many periodicals compiled their own chart.

By the 1980s, NME and Melody Maker had the last surviving independently compiled charts in the UK, Record Mirror having ended its own chart in 1962, Disc & Music Echo likewise in 1967, and the short-lived Top Pops/Music Now folding in 1971. Melody Maker was the first to throw in the towel, publishing its last independently compiled chart on 4 June 1988, with NME publishing its last the next week on 11 June 1988. In the respective following weeks, both began publishing Market Research Information Bureau chart.

Notable differences when compared to the official chart run by BMRB and, later, Gallup, and even NME are additional number-one singles in the decade for Rick Astley, Adam and the Ants, The Police, Shakin' Stevens, David Bowie, Frankie Goes to Hollywood and Phil Collins. Significantly, Tears for Fears' song "Everybody Wants to Rule the World" spent four weeks at the top of the Melody Maker chart (and three weeks on the NME chart) although it never topped the Gallup chart. Additionally, as well as making number one on the Melody Maker and NME charts and not the official chart, a-ha's "Take On Me" and Ultravox's "Vienna" were also in the top five best-selling singles of their year. Thirty-two acts achieved a number-one single on the Melody Maker chart (more than NME) but never had an official number-one single (Note: Altered Images, Bomb the Bass, Judy Boucher, Chas & Dave, Club Nouveau, Randy Crawford, Dire Straits, Erasure, Harold Faltermeyer, Freeez, Peter Gabriel, Heaven 17, Imagination, Janet Jackson, King, Patti LaBelle, Jona Lewie, Michael McDonald, Ennio Morricone, Nana Mouskouri, Nu Shooz, The Pointer Sisters, the Royal Philharmonic Orchestra, Simply Red, Splodgenessabounds, Starsound, The Stranglers, The Style Council, Tears for Fears, Ultravox, Kim Wilde, and Yazoo never had an official number-one single; in addition, Boucher, Chas & Dave, Club Nouveau, Erasure, Faltermeyer, Freeez, Gabriel, Heaven 17, Imagination, Jackson, LaBelle, McDonald, Mouskouri, Nu Shooz, the Royal Philharmonic Orchestra, Simply Red, Splodgenessabounds, The Stranglers, The Style Council, Wilde, and Yazoo never had a number-one single on the NME charts.) although two of these had songs they had written reach number one when performed by another artist. (Note: Ennio Morricone's theme "The Good, the Bad and the Ugly" was a number one for Hugo Montenegro and Tears for Fears' song "Mad World" reached number one when performed by Gary Jules.)

== Number-one singles ==
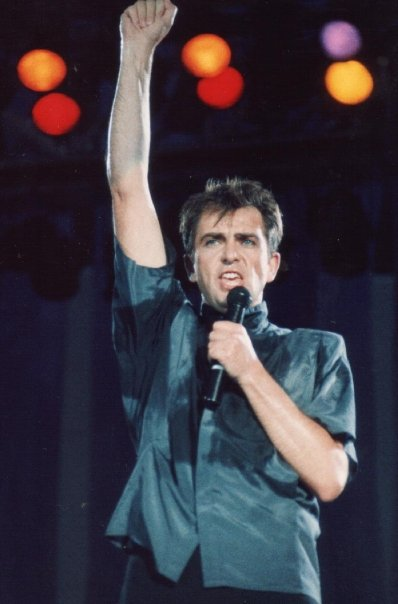
Peter Gabriel's "Sledgehammer" was one of 26 Melody Maker number ones of the 1980s that did not reach the top of the UK Singles or NME charts.

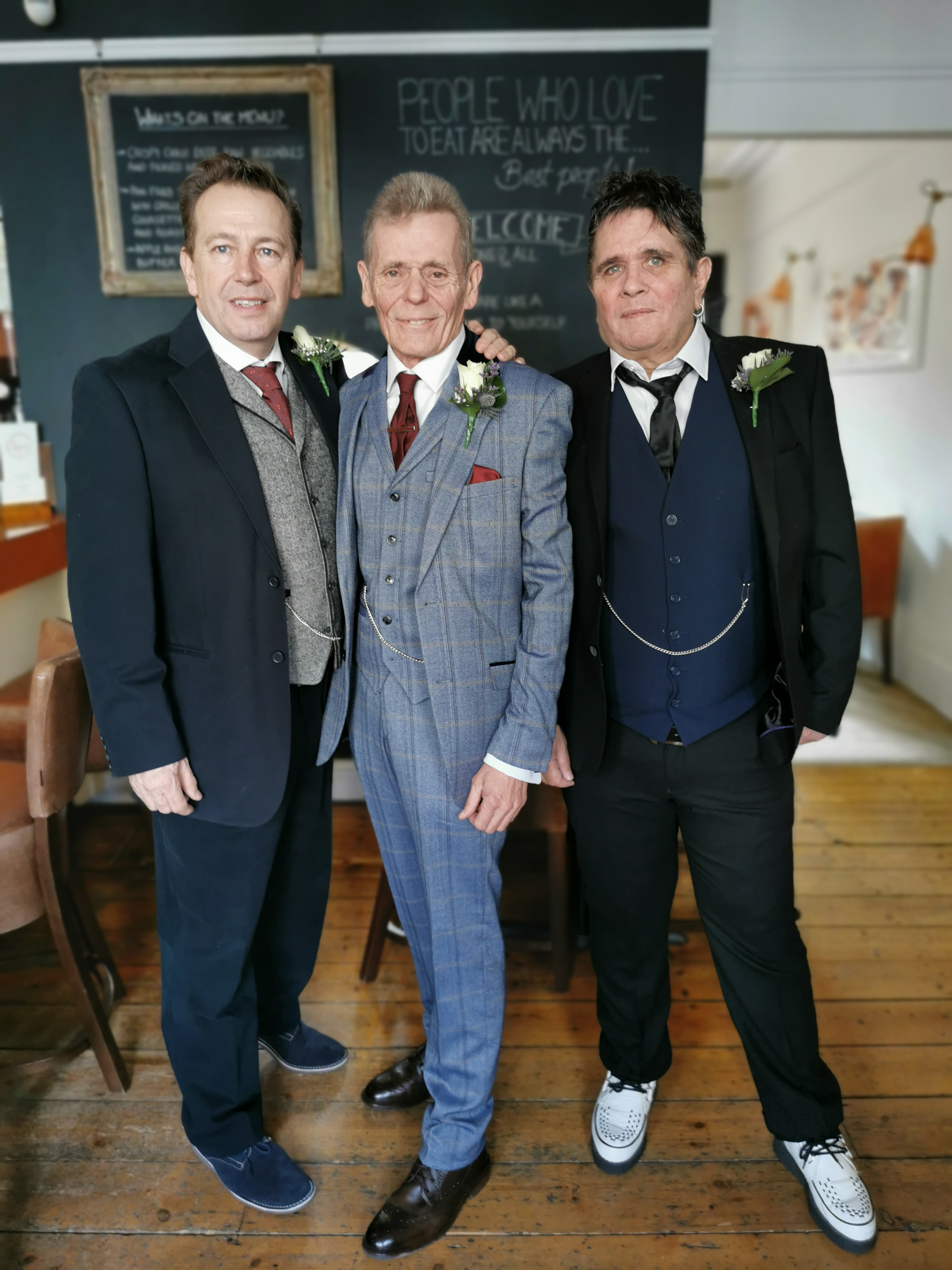
Splodgenessabounds had their only number one in Melody Maker when their "Two Pints of Lager and a Packet of Crisps Please" reached the top in 1980.

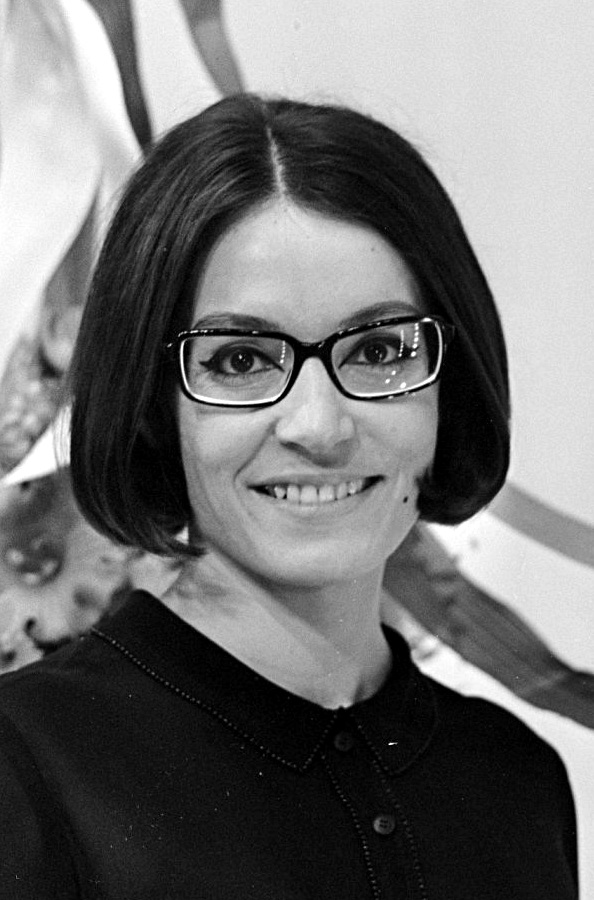
Nana Mouskouri was another artist whose only UK number-one was with Melody Maker when her "Only Love" topped their chart in 1986.

Key
‡	The song did not reach number one on the BMRB which later became the Gallup chart which is considered as the official chart after 15 February 1969.
[nb #]	The song spent a week at number one where it shared the top spot with another song.

No.	Artist (Note: The names, singles, week-ending dates and consecutive duration of the number-ones are from Melody Maker."Melody Maker 1980's Singles Charts request". UKMix.)	Single	Reached number one	Weeks at number one
1980
428	Pretenders	"Brass in Pocket"	19 January 1980	2
429	Madness	"My Girl" ‡	2 February 1980	1
430	The Specials	Too Much, Too Young (E.P.) (Note: This number-one record was not a single but a five-track extended play (EP) with "Too Much Too Young" as the lead track. The rules now require at most four distinct songs to be eligible for the UK Singles Chart. Although the EP is credited to The Special A.K.A. on the record sleeve the record label credits The Specials.)	9 February 1980	2
431	Kenny Rogers	"Coward of the County"	23 February 1980	1
432	Blondie	"Atomic"	1 March 1980	3
433	Fern Kinney	"Together We Are Beautiful"	22 March 1980	1
434	The Jam	"Going Underground"	29 March 1980	3
435	The Detroit Spinners	"Working My Way Back to You – Forgive Me Girl"	19 April 1980	1
436	Blondie	"Call Me"	26 April 1980	1
437	Dexy's Midnight Runners	"Geno"	3 May 1980	3 (Note: Due to a newspaper strike, Melody Maker was not published from 3 May to 31 May 1980; however, the chart details were released retrospectively.)
438	Johnny Logan	"What's Another Year"	24 May 1980	1
439	The Mash	"Theme from M*A*S*H"	31 May 1980	4
440	Don McLean	"Crying"	28 June 1980	1
441	Splodgenessabounds	"Two Pints of Lager and a Packet of Crisps Please" ‡	5 July 1980	1
442	Olivia Newton-John and the Electric Light Orchestra	"Xanadu"	12 July 1980	2
443	Odyssey	"Use It Up and Wear It Out"	26 July 1980	2
444	Diana Ross	"Upside Down" ‡	9 August 1980	1
445	ABBA	"The Winner Takes It All"	16 August 1980	2
446	David Bowie	"Ashes to Ashes"	30 August 1980	2
447	The Jam	"Start!"	13 September 1980	1
448	Randy Crawford	"One Day I'll Fly Away" ‡	20 September 1980	2
449	The Police	"Don't Stand So Close to Me"	4 October 1980	4
450	Barbra Streisand	"A Woman in Love"	1 November 1980	2
451	Blondie	"The Tide Is High"	15 November 1980	3
452	ABBA	"Supertrouper"	6 December 1980	2
453	Jona Lewie	"Stop the Cavalry" ‡	20 December 1980	3
1981
454	John Lennon	"(Just Like) Starting Over"	10 January 1981	1
455	John Lennon	"Imagine"	17 January 1981	1
456	Adam and the Ants	"Ant Music" ‡	24 January 1981	1
457	Phil Collins	"In the Air Tonight" ‡	31 January 1981	2
458	Ultravox	"Vienna" ‡	14 February 1981	1
459	Joe Dolce	"Shaddap You Face"	21 February 1981	2
re	Ultravox	"Vienna" ‡	7 March 1981	1
460	Roxy Music	"Jealous Guy"	14 March 1981	2
461	Kim Wilde	"Kids in America" ‡	28 March 1981	1
462	Shakin' Stevens	"This Ole House"	4 April 1981	2
463	Bucks Fizz	"Making Your Mind Up"	18 April 1981	2
464	Ennio Morricone	"Theme from Lloyd George" ‡	2 May 1981	1
465	Starsound	"Stars on 45" ‡	9 May 1981	1
466	Adam and the Ants	"Stand and Deliver"	16 May 1981	4
467	Shakin' Stevens	"You Drive Me Crazy" ‡	6 June 1981	1
468	Smokey Robinson	"Being with You"	13 June 1981	3
469	Michael Jackson	"One Day In Your Life"	4 July 1981	1
470	The Specials	"Ghost Town"	11 July 1981	3
471	Stevie Wonder	"Happy Birthday" ‡	1 August 1981	1
472	Shakin' Stevens	"Green Door"	8 August 1981	2
473	Royal Philharmonic Orchestra	"Hooked on Classics" ‡	22 August 1981	1
474	Aneka	"Japanese Boy"	29 August 1981	1
475	Soft Cell	"Tainted Love"	5 September 1981	2
476	Adam and the Ants	"Prince Charming"	19 September 1981	3
477	The Police	"Invisible Sun" ‡	10 October 1981	1
478	Dave Stewart and Barbara Gaskin	"It's My Party"	17 October 1981	3
479	Altered Images	"Happy Birthday" ‡	7 November 1981	1
480	The Police	"Every Little Thing She Does Is Magic"	14 November 1981	1
481	Queen and David Bowie	"Under Pressure"	21 November 1981	3
482	Julio Iglesias	"Begin the Beguine"	12 December 1981	1
483	The Human League	"Don't You Want Me"	19 December 1981	5
1982
484	Bucks Fizz	"The Land of Make Believe"	23 January 1982	1
485	Kraftwerk	"The Model"	30 January 1982	1
486	The Stranglers	"Golden Brown" ‡	6 February 1982	1
487	The Jam	"A Town Called Malice" / "Precious"	13 February 1982	3
488	Tight Fit	"The Lion Sleeps Tonight"	6 March 1982	3
489	Goombay Dance Band	"Seven Tears"	27 March 1982	2
490	Imagination	"Just an Illusion" ‡	10 April 1982	1
491	Chas & Dave	"Ain't No Pleasing You" ‡	17 April 1982	1
492	Paul McCartney and Stevie Wonder	"Ebony and Ivory"	24 April 1982	4
493	Nicole	"A Little Peace"	22 May 1982	1
494	Yazoo	"Only You" ‡	29 May 1982	1
495	Madness	"House of Fun"	5 June 1982	2
496	Adam Ant	"Goody Two Shoes"	19 June 1982	1
497	Soft Cell	"Torch" ‡	26 June 1982	1
498	Charlene	"I've Never Been to Me"	3 July 1982	1
499	Captain Sensible	"Happy Talk"	10 July 1982	1
500	Irene Cara	"Fame"	17 July 1982	3
501	Dexy's Midnight Runners	"Come On Eileen"	7 August 1982	4
502	Survivor	"Eye of the Tiger"	4 September 1982	2
503	Dire Straits	"Private Investigations" ‡	18 September 1982	2
504	The Jam	"The Bitterest Pill" ‡	2 October 1982	1
505	Musical Youth	"Pass the Dutchie"	9 October 1982	2
506	Culture Club	"Do You Really Want to Hurt Me"	23 October 1982	3
507	Eddy Grant	"I Don't Want to Dance"	13 November 1982	3
508	The Human League	"Mirror Man" ‡	4 December 1982	1
509	The Jam	"Beat Surrender"	11 December 1982	4
1983
510	Phil Collins	"You Can't Hurry Love"	8 January 1983	3
511	Men at Work	"Down Under"	29 January 1983	3
512	Tears for Fears	"Change" ‡	19 February 1983	1
513	Kajagoogoo	"Too Shy"	26 February 1983	1
514	Michael Jackson	"Billie Jean"	5 March 1983	2
515	Bonnie Tyler	"Total Eclipse of the Heart"	19 March 1983	1
516	The Style Council	"Speak Like a Child" ‡	26 March 1983	1
517	Duran Duran	"Is There Something I Should Know?"	2 April 1983	1
518	David Bowie	"Let's Dance"	9 April 1983	4
519	Spandau Ballet	"True"	7 May 1983	3
520	Heaven 17	"Temptation" ‡	28 May 1983	1
521	The Police	"Every Breath You Take"	4 June 1983	3
522	David Bowie	"China Girl" ‡	25 June 1983	1
523	Rod Stewart	"Baby Jane"	2 July 1983	2
524	Paul Young	"Whenever I Lay My Hat"	16 July 1983	4
525	Freeez	"I.O.U." ‡	13 August 1983	1
526	KC and the Sunshine Band	"Give It Up"	20 August 1983	1
527	Spandau Ballet	"Gold" ‡	27 August 1983	2
528	UB40	"Red Red Wine"	10 September 1983	2
529	Culture Club	"Karma Chameleon"	24 September 1983	6
530	Lionel Richie	"All Night Long (All Night)" ‡	5 November 1983	1
531	Billy Joel	"Uptown Girl"	12 November 1983	2
532	Paul McCartney and Michael Jackson	"Say, Say, Say" ‡	26 November 1983	1
533	The Assembly	"Never Never" ‡	3 December 1983	1
534	The Flying Pickets	"Only You"	10 December 1983	5
1984
535	Paul McCartney	"Pipes of Peace"	14 January 1984	1
536	Frankie Goes to Hollywood	"Relax"	21 January 1984	6
537	Nena	"99 Red Balloons"	3 March 1984	3
538	Lionel Richie	"Hello"	24 March 1984	5
539	Phil Collins	"Against All Odds (Take a Look at Me Now)" ‡	28 April 1984	4
540	The Pointer Sisters	"Automatic" ‡	26 May 1984	1
541	Wham!	"Wake Me Up Before You Go-Go"	2 June 1984	3
542	Frankie Goes to Hollywood	"Two Tribes"	23 June 1984	7
543	George Michael	"Careless Whisper"	11 August 1984	4
544	Stevie Wonder	"I Just Called to Say I Love You"	8 September 1984	5
545	Culture Club	"The War Song" ‡	13 October 1984	1
546	Wham!	"Freedom"	20 October 1984	3
547	Chaka Khan	"I Feel for You"	10 November 1984	4
548	Frankie Goes to Hollywood	"The Power of Love" *	8 December 1984	1
549	Band Aid	"Do They Know It's Christmas?"	15 December 1984	5
1985
550	Wham!	"Everything She Wants" / "Last Christmas" ‡	19 January 1985	1
551	Foreigner	"I Want to Know What Love Is"	26 January 1985	1
552	Prince	"1999" ‡	2 February 1985	1
553	King	"Love and Pride" ‡	9 February 1985	2
554	Elaine Paige and Barbara Dickson	"I Know Him So Well"	23 February 1985	1
555	Dead or Alive	"You Spin Me Round"	2 March 1985	3
556	Philip Bailey (duet with Phil Collins)	"Easy Lover"	23 March 1985	3
557	Tears for Fears	"Everybody Wants to Rule the World" ‡	20 April 1985	2
558	Phyllis Nelson	"Move Closer"	4 May 1985	1
559	Paul Hardcastle	"19"	11 May 1985	5
560	The Crowd	"You'll Never Walk Alone"	15 June 1985	2
561	Madonna	"Crazy for You" ‡	29 June 1985	1
562	Sister Sledge	"Frankie"	6 July 1985	1
563	Harold Faltermeyer	"Axel F" ‡	13 July 1985	2
564	Eurythmics	"There Must Be an Angel"	27 July 1985	1
565	Madonna	"Into the Groove"	3 August 1985	5
566	David Bowie and Mick Jagger	"Dancing in the Street"	7 September 1985	5
567	Jennifer Rush	"The Power of Love"	12 October 1985	3
568	a-ha	"Take On Me" ‡	2 November 1985	2
569	Feargal Sharkey	"A Good Heart"	16 November 1985	2
570	Wham!	"I'm Your Man"	30 November 1985	2
571	Whitney Houston	"Saving All My Love for You"	14 December 1985	4
1986
572	Pet Shop Boys	"West End Girls"	11 January 1986	2
573	a-ha	"The Sun Always Shines on T.V."	25 January 1986	2
574	Nana Mouskouri	"Only Love" ‡	8 February 1986	1
575	Billy Ocean	"When the Going Gets Tough"	15 February 1986	3
576	Diana Ross	"Chain Reaction"	8 March 1986	3
577	Cliff Richard and The Young Ones	"Livin' Doll"	29 March 1986	3
578	George Michael	"A Different Corner"	19 April 1986	3
579	Janet Jackson	"What Have You Done for Me Lately?" ‡	10 May 1986	1
580	Patti LaBelle and Michael McDonald	"On My Own" ‡	17 May 1986	1
581	Spitting Image	"The Chicken Song"	24 May 1986	1
582	Peter Gabriel	"Sledgehammer" ‡	31 May 1986	2
583	Simply Red	"Holding Back the Years" ‡	14 June 1986	1
584	Nu Shooz	"I Can't Wait" ‡	21 June 1986	1
585	Wham!	"The Edge of Heaven"	28 June 1986	2
586	Madonna	"Papa Don't Preach"	12 July 1986	3
587	Chris de Burgh	"The Lady in Red"	2 August 1986	3
588	Boris Gardiner	"I Want to Wake Up with You"	23 August 1986	2
589	The Communards	"Don't Leave Me This Way"	6 September 1986	5
590	Madonna	"True Blue"	11 October 1986	1
591	Nick Berry	"Every Loser Wins"	18 October 1986	3
592	Berlin	"You Take My Breath Away"	8 November 1986	5
593	Erasure	"Sometimes" ‡	13 December 1986	1
594	The Housemartins	"Caravan of Love"	20 December 1986	3
1987
595	Jackie Wilson	"Reet Petite"	10 January 1987	2
596	Steve "Silk" Hurley	"Jack Your Body" (Note: "Jack Your Body" was released on a 12" single that was over 25 minutes long, exceededing the maximum time for a record to be classified as a single. The track should have been classified as an album instead (as it was in NME) and, during the two weeks it spent at number one, "Reet Petite" would have been number one for a third week and "I Knew You Were Waiting (For Me)" would have become number one a week earlier.)	24 January 1987	2
597	Aretha Franklin and George Michael	"I Knew You Were Waiting (For Me)"	7 February 1987	3
598	Ben E. King	"Stand by Me"	28 February 1987	3
599	Boy George	"Everything I Own"	21 March 1987	1
600	Mel and Kim	"Respectable"	28 March 1987	1
601	Ferry Aid	"Let It Be"	4 April 1987	3
602	Club Nouveau	"Lean on Me" ‡	25 April 1987	1
603	Madonna	"La Isla Bonita"	2 May 1987	1
604	Judy Boucher	"Can't Be with You Tonight" ‡	9 May 1987	1
605	Starship	"Nothing's Gonna Stop Us Now"	16 May 1987	3
606	Whitney Houston	"I Wanna Dance with Somebody"	6 June 1987	3
607	The Firm	"Star Trekkin'"	27 June 1987	1
608	Pet Shop Boys	"It's a Sin"	4 July 1987	3
609	Madonna	"Who's That Girl"	25 July 1987	2
610	Los Lobos	"La Bamba"	8 August 1987	1
611	Michael Jackson	"I Just Can't Stop Loving You"	15 August 1987	2
612	Rick Astley	"Never Gonna Give You Up"	29 August 1987	4
613	M|A|R|R|S	"Pump Up the Volume"	26 September 1987	3
614	Bee Gees	"You Win Again"	17 October 1987	3
615	George Michael	"Faith" ‡	7 November 1987	2
616	T'Pau	"China in Your Hand"	21 November 1987	4
617	Rick Astley	"When I Fall in Love" ‡	19 December 1987	3
1988
618	Pet Shop Boys	"Always on My Mind"	9 January 1988	1
619	Belinda Carlisle	"Heaven Is a Place on Earth"	16 January 1988	2
620	Tiffany	"I Think We're Alone Now"	30 January 1988	3
621	Kylie Minogue	"I Should Be So Lucky"	20 February 1988	2
622	Bomb the Bass	"Beat Dis" ‡	5 March 1988	1
623	Rick Astley	"Together Forever" ‡	12 March 1988	2
624	Aswad	"Don't Turn Around"	26 March 1988	3
625	Pet Shop Boys	"Heart"	16 April 1988	2
626	S-Express	"Theme from S-Express"	30 April 1988	1
627	Fairground Attraction	"Perfect"	7 May 1988	2
628	Wet Wet Wet; Billy Bragg and Cara Tivey	"With a Little Help from My Friends" "She's Leaving Home"	21 May 1988	3
