= I Should Be So Lucky =

1987 single by Kylie Minogue

Single by Kylie Minogue

from the album Kylie
- Released: 29 December 1987
- Studio: PWL (London)
- Genre: Pop; Hi-NRG
- Length: 3:28: 3:07 (video version – alternative)
- Label: PWL; Mushroom; Geffen
- Songwriters: Mike Stock; Matt Aitken; Pete Waterman
- Producer: Stock Aitken Waterman

Kylie Minogue singles chronology
"Locomotion" (1987)	"I Should Be So Lucky" (1987)	"Got to Be Certain" (1988)

Alternative cover
- Australian single cover art

Music video
- "I Should Be So Lucky" on YouTube

"I Should Be So Lucky" is a 1987 song performed by Australian singer and songwriter Kylie Minogue from her debut album, Kylie (1988). Released on 29 December 1987 by Mushroom Records and PWL Records, the song became her worldwide breakthrough hit. The image of Minogue on the front cover of the single was shot by David Levine. The song was written and produced for Minogue by Stock Aitken Waterman, who went on to produce Minogue's initial four albums.

The song received positive reviews from contemporary music critics, although some dismissed the "simplistic" lyrical content. Despite this, it received commercial attention around the world, topping the charts in countries such as the United Kingdom, Australia, Germany and South Africa, and peaking within the top-ten in countries like New Zealand and Japan, as well as the Billboard Dance Club Songs chart in the United States. A six-minute dance remix by Pete Hammond was released on 45 rpm 12-inch vinyl for deejays.

In 2023, Minogue voiced a special rendition of "I Should Be So Lucky" for BBC Sport's opening film, to front England's semi-final match against Australia at the 2023 FIFA Women's World Cup.

== Recording and development ==
After the success of her debut single "Locomotion" in Australia, Minogue traveled to London to work with Stock Aitken Waterman, a successful British writing and production team. They knew little of Minogue and had forgotten that she was arriving; as a result, they wrote "I Should Be So Lucky" in forty minutes while she waited outside the recording studio. Mike Stock wrote the lyrics for the song in response to what he had learned about Minogue prior to her arrival. He believed that although she was a successful soap star in Australia and very talented, there must be something wrong with her and figured that she must be unlucky in love. Minogue recorded the song in less than an hour, which Stock attributes to her good ear for music and her quick memorization skills. However, she left the studio angry, not knowing what the song sounded like after she was fed it to sing line by line.

After Minogue finished the recording session, she returned home to Australia to continue work on the soap opera Neighbours. The track was then shelved and forgotten about by the producers, and was only mixed and completed after threats by Mushroom Records general manager Gary Ashley to fly to the UK. Stock later told The Guardian: "We had to get the song together in about 40 minutes and she left not having had a happy experience. We didn’t know we had a hit on our hands and so when it went to No 1 for five weeks, someone said: 'What’s the follow-up?' We didn't have one. So I went out to Australia at the start of 1988 and met her in a bar with Jason and her manager. I basically crawled 100 yards on my knees and apologised profusely."

== Composition ==
"I Should Be So Lucky" is a pop and hi-NRG song which features elements of bubblegum pop and new wave music. According to the music sheet on MusicNotes.com, which was published by Universal Music Publishing Group, the song is set in the key of C major. Minogue's vocals span from D_{4} to C_{5}. The song is set in common time and moves at a moderate tempo of 116 beats per minute. Instrumentation of the song features synthesizers, keyboards and guitars. According to PopMatters, the song features "numerous orchestra hits to the uncomfortably thin sounding drum machine." Waterman has said the tune was inspired by Pachelbel's Canon, but Stock and Aitken said this was not the case. Stock told The Guardian: "Anyone who thinks 'I Should Be So Lucky' is easy should try to play it. It's in four keys, all of them really awkward, and you can't even strum it unless you're a really good musician."

== Critical reception ==
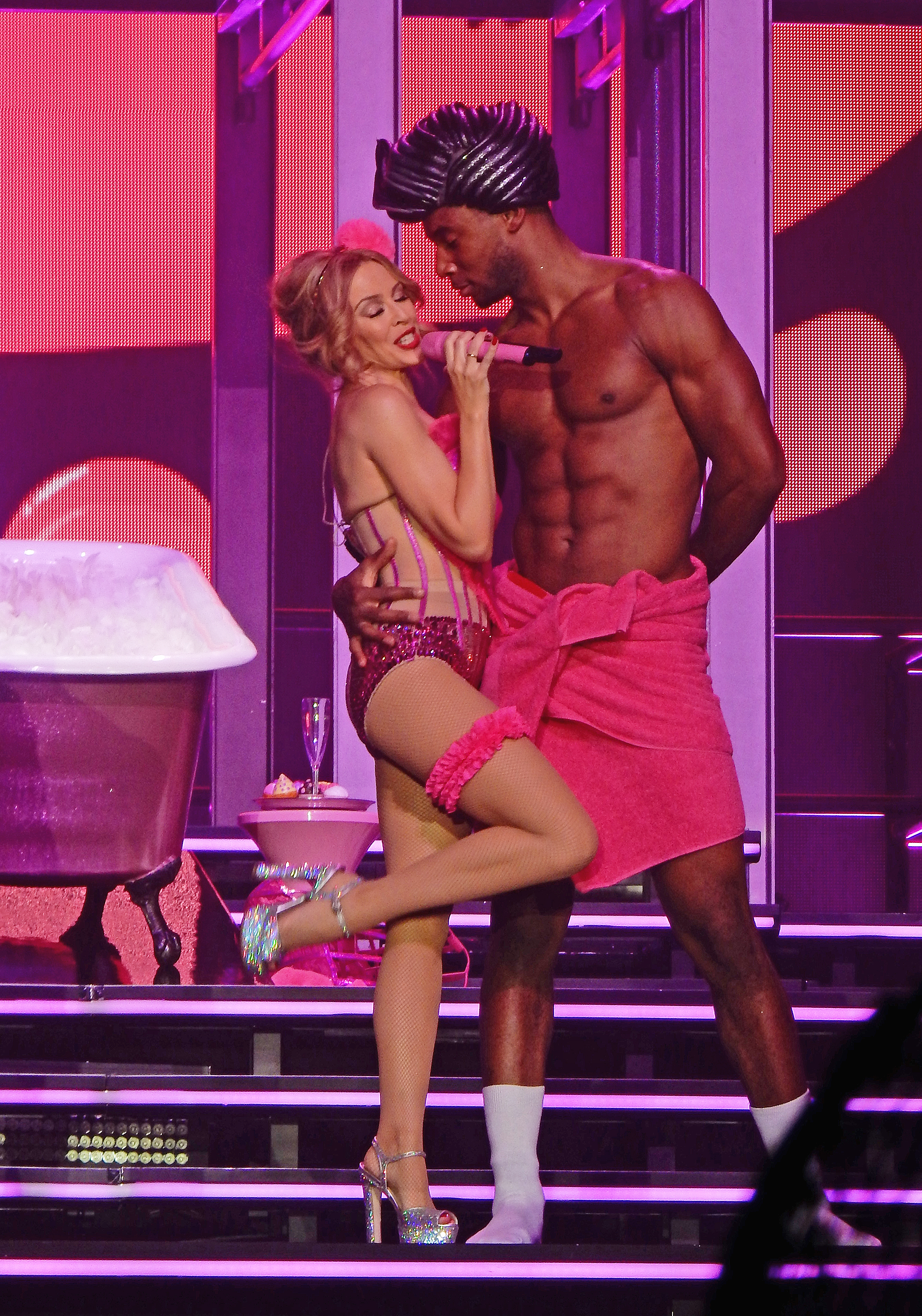
Kylie singing "I Should Be So Lucky" as part of the "Dollhouse Medley", on 2014's Kiss Me Once Tour

"I Should Be So Lucky" garnered positive reviews from some music critics. Nick Levine from Digital Spy called it a "standout track". Chris True from AllMusic had reviewed the album, and highlighted the song as an album standout. But as a separate rating, they gave the single three stars out of five. In the review of The Best of Kylie Minogue (2012), Tim Sendra highlighted it as an album standout. Hunter Felt from PopMatters gave it a positive review, stating "something about Kylie’s innocent yet forceful vocals and the sheer catchiness of the song itself [...] So the song became a beloved secret, and I never bothered to try to tune my friends in on "I Could Be So Lucky", or, crazier yet, proclaim that this "has-been" would be a critical and commercial darling in a few years time." However, he did say the song was clichéd. However, Mark Edwards from Stylus Magazine gave it a scathing remark by saying "Listening to the first tracks on Ultimate Kylie, you want to skip straight through, because early songs like "I Should Be So Lucky" and "Locomotion" are unlistenable—horribly naff, squeaky songs" and criticised Stock, Aitken and Waterman songs they produced in the 80s by stating "[the songs] transport the listener back to a time when every single in the UK charts was either written by Stock, Aitken and Waterman or sung by an Aussie soap star, or both." James Hamilton of Record Mirror called the song a "typically catchy shrill 115 1/2 bpm rinky tinky canterer from Stock Aitken Waterman's Bananarama reject pile", adding that "as by now everyone must be sick of hearing" Minogue. OK! called the song a "classic".

Retrospectively, in 2021, British magazine Classic Pop ranked it number 11 in their list of "Top 40 Stock Aitken Waterman songs". In 2024, the same magazine ranked the song at number 17 in its list of "Top 40 Kylie Minogue songs", describing it as a SAW "squeaky clean confection". In 2023, Robert Moran of Australian daily tabloid newspaper The Sydney Morning Herald ranked the song as Minogue's 56th best song (out of 183), adding that "the peppy overproduction masks a melancholy yearning... Those diva-ish adlibs at the end are hilariously thin, but that's just part of the charm". In 2025, Thomas Edward of Smooth Radio ranked the song seventh in his list of "Stock Aitken Waterman's 15 greatest songs, ranked".

The song was also known to many in the late 1980s and early 1990s as one of Minogue's signature songs, which many critics entering the song on their best track or worst track list. And additionally, in 2011, "I Should Be So Lucky" was added to the National Film and Sound Archive of Australia's Sounds of Australia registry for songs of "cultural, historical and aesthetic significance and relevance". "I Should Be So Lucky" later appeared on seven of Kylie's hit compilations including Greatest Hits (1992), Ultimate Kylie (2004), and Step Back in Time: The Definitive Collection (2019). The song won the Highest-Selling Single award at the 3rd annual ARIA Awards.

== Commercial performance ==
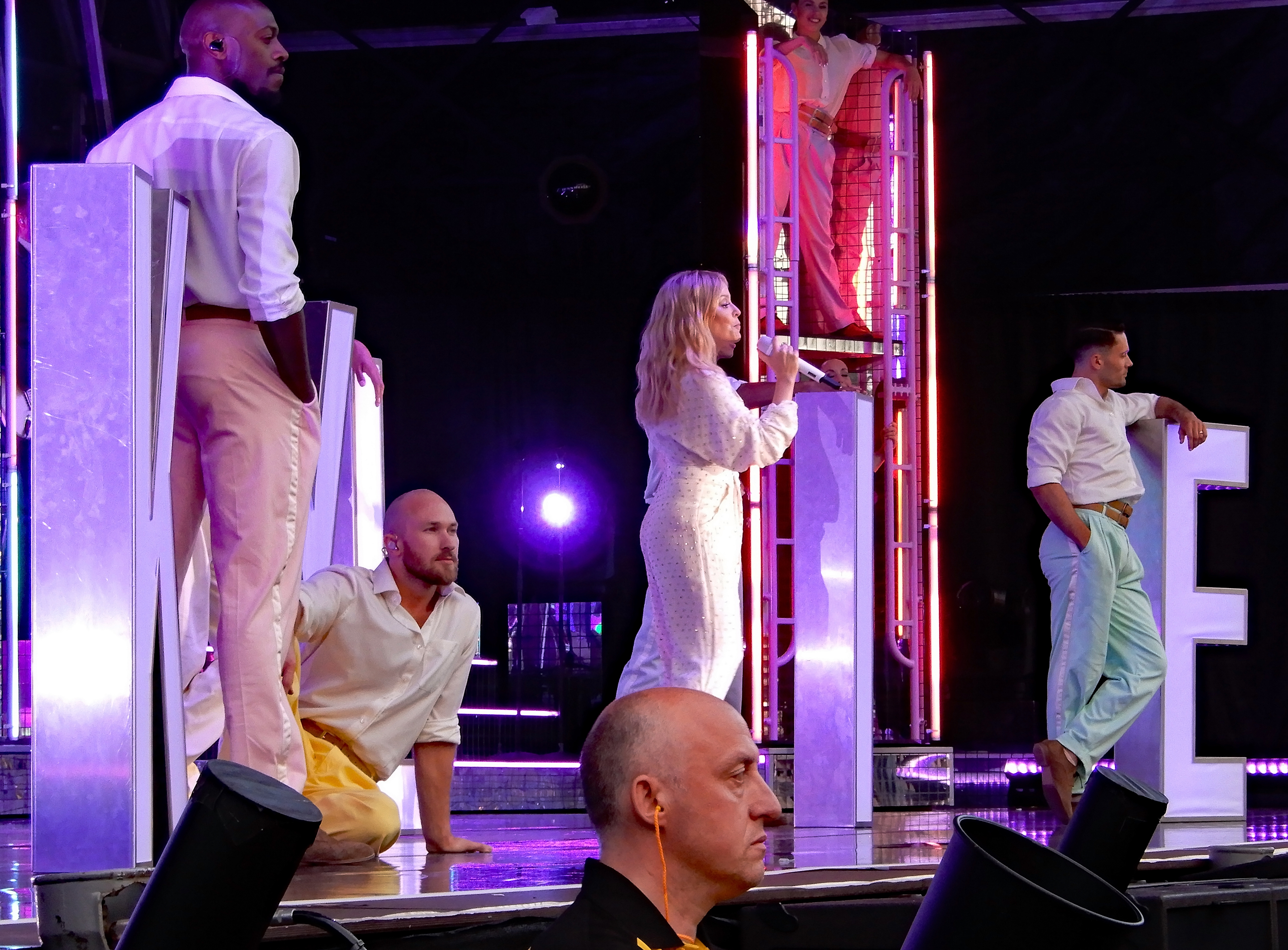
Minogue, flanked by dancers, performing "I Should Be So Lucky" during her 2019 summer tour in Castlefield Bowl

"I Should Be So Lucky" was released in the UK on 29 December 1987, and in Australia on 1 February 1988. It was a commercial success, staying atop the Australian Kent Music Report chart for six consecutive weeks, and became her second number-one single in her home country, following "Locomotion". The single was certified Platinum by the Australian Recording Industry Association (ARIA) and ranked fifth on the year-end chart for 1988. In New Zealand, the song entered at number 15 on New Zealand Top 40 and peaked at number 3 on 27 March 1988, spending twelve weeks on the chart. "I Should Be So Lucky" entered at number 90 on the UK Singles Chart, climbing to number 54 the following week. Three weeks later it rose to number 1, and remained at the top for five weeks. It spent seventeen weeks on the chart. It was certified Gold by the British Phonographic Industry (BPI) for the shipment of 600,000 copies. The song was one of the best-selling singles of 1988, with estimated sales of over 675,000.

In the United States, "I Should Be So Lucky" peaked at No. 28 on the Billboard Hot 100 (dated July 16, 1988) and No. 10 on the US Hot Dance Club Play chart (dated June 4, 1988). Elsewhere, it became a top-five hit in Austria, France, and Norway, as well as a chart hit in Belgium, the Netherlands, and Sweden. and was also a No. 1 hit in Finland, Germany, Hong Kong, Ireland, Israel, and Switzerland, and spent seven weeks atop the South African pop chart. The song was certified Silver by the Syndicat National de l'Édition Phonographique (SNEP) and Gold in Germany.

== Music video ==
The music video for "I Should Be So Lucky" was directed by Chris Langman and filmed during November 1987 at Channel 7 Studios in Melbourne, Australia. The video features Minogue walking through her home, with scenes of her dancing in front of a colourful chalkboard background intercut throughout. It presented a cute, wholesome, young "girl-next-door" image of Minogue to the public, with scenes of her giggling and making funny faces to the camera.

Another version of the video was made for television promotion. This version of the video shows Kylie riding in a car through Sydney. In other parts of the video, she is in the park and passersby are waving to her as she walks by them. This video premiered in the UK on Christmas Day 1987 in a live broadcast from the British Telecom Tower (Christmas Morning With Noel Edmonds, BBC1). The official version of "I Should Be So Lucky" featured in the music video has been released commercially through multiple VHS and DVD collections. Its most recent inclusion is on the companion DVD to her 2012 greatest hits album, The Best of Kylie Minogue. Outtakes from the music video were used in Kylie: The Videos.

== Credits and personnel ==
Credits adapted from Kylie album liner notes.

- Kylie Minogue – vocals
- Dee Lewis – backing vocals
- Mae McKenna – backing vocals
- Mike Stock – backing vocals, keyboards
- Matt Aitken – guitars, keyboards
- A. Linn – drums
- Mark McGuire – engineering
- Pete Hammond – mixing
- Burni Adams – engineering
- Rick O’Neil – mastering engineer

== Charts ==
=== Weekly charts ===
1987–1988 weekly chart performance for "I Should Be So Lucky"
Chart (1987–1988)	Peak position
Australia (Kent Music Report)	1
Austria (Ö3 Austria Top 40)	4
Belgium (Ultratop 50 Flanders)	8
Canada Top Singles (RPM)	61
Denmark (IFPI)	4
Europe (European Hot 100 Singles)	1
Europe (European Airplay Top 50)	3
Finland (Suomen virallinen lista)	1
France (SNEP)	4
Greece (IFPI)	2
Hong Kong (IFPI)	1
Ireland (IRMA)	1
Italy (Musica e dischi)	23
Italy Airplay (Music & Media)	7
Japan (Oricon Singles Chart)	63
Luxembourg (Radio Luxembourg)	1
Netherlands (Single Top 100)	12
Netherlands (Dutch Top 40)	14
New Zealand (Recorded Music NZ)	3
Norway (VG-lista)	5
Panama (UPI)	8
Quebec (ADISQ)	5
South Africa Airplay (EMA)	1
Sweden (Sverigetopplistan)	13
Switzerland (Schweizer Hitparade)	1
UK Singles (Official Charts)	1
UK Dance (Music Week)	1
US Billboard Hot 100	28
U.S. Cashbox Charts	31
US Dance Club Songs (Billboard)	10
US Contemporary Hit Radio (Radio & Records)	30
West Germany (GfK)	1

=== Year-end charts ===
1988 year-end chart performance for "I Should Be So Lucky"
Chart (1988)	Position
Australia (ARIA)	5
Austria (Ö3 Austria Top 40)	30
Belgium (Ultratop 50 Flanders)	80
Europe (European Airplay Top 50)	12
Europe (European Hot 100 Singles)	1
New Zealand (RIANZ)	27
Switzerland (Schweizer Hitparade)	16
UK Singles (OCC)	3
UK Dance (Music Week)	7
West Germany (Media Control)	16

1985–1989 chart performance for "I Should Be So Lucky"
Chart (1985–1989)	Position
Europe (European Hot 100 Singles)	7

== Certifications and sales ==
Region	Certification	Certified units/sales
Australia (ARIA)	Platinum	70,000^{^}
France (SNEP)	Silver	250,000^{*}
Germany (BVMI)	Gold	250,000^{^}
Japan	—	30,140
United Kingdom (BPI)	Gold	702,850
Summaries
Europe	—	1,500,000
^{*} Sales figures based on certification alone.^{^} Shipments figures based on certification alone.

== See also ==
- List of best-selling singles of the 1980s in the United Kingdom
- List of Melody Maker number-one singles of the 1980s
- List of UK charts and number-one singles (1969–1988)
- List of UK top-ten singles in 1988
- List of top 25 singles for 1988 in Australia
- List of European number-one hits of 1988
- List of number-one singles of 1988 (Finland)
- List of number-one hits of 1988 (Germany)
- List of number-one singles of 1988 (Ireland)
- List of number-one singles in Australia during the 1980s
- List of NME number-one singles of the 1980s
- List of UK Independent Singles Chart number ones of the 1980s
- List of UK Singles Chart number ones of the 1980s
- List of number-one singles of the 1980s (Switzerland)
