= List of number-one singles of 1988 (Finland) =

This is the list of the number-one singles of the Finnish Singles Chart in 1988.

== Chart history ==
Issue date	Artist	Title
Week 1	Pet Shop Boys	"Always On My Mind"
Week 2	Pet Shop Boys	"Always On My Mind"
Week 3	Pet Shop Boys	"Always On My Mind"
Week 4	Pet Shop Boys	"Always On My Mind"
Week 5	Pet Shop Boys	"Always On My Mind"
Week 6	AC/DC	"Heatseeker"
Week 7	AC/DC	"Heatseeker"
Week 8	AC/DC	"Heatseeker"
Week 9	Sleepy Sleepers	"Nykäsen Matti"
Week 10	Sleepy Sleepers	"Nykäsen Matti"
Week 11	Sleepy Sleepers	"Nykäsen Matti"
Week 12	Kylie Minogue	"I Should Be So Lucky"
Week 13	Kylie Minogue	"I Should Be So Lucky"
Week 14	Topi Sorsakoski & J. Karjalainen	"On kesäyö/Viimeinen laulu"
Week 15	Topi Sorsakoski & J. Karjalainen	"On kesäyö/Viimeinen laulu"
Week 16	Topi Sorsakoski & J. Karjalainen	"On kesäyö/Viimeinen laulu"
Week 17	Pet Shop Boys	"Heart"
Week 18	Pet Shop Boys	"Heart"
Week 19	Aki & Turo	"Mahtisonni"
Week 20	Aki & Turo	"Mahtisonni"
Week 21	Kylie Minogue	"Got to Be Certain"
Week 22	Kylie Minogue	"Got to Be Certain"
Week 23	Kylie Minogue	"Got to Be Certain"
Week 24	Eppu Normaali	"Afrikka, sarvikuonojen maa"
Week 25	Eppu Normaali	"Afrikka, sarvikuonojen maa"
Week 26	Eppu Normaali	"Afrikka, sarvikuonojen maa"
Week 27	Eppu Normaali	"Afrikka, sarvikuonojen maa"
Week 28	Eppu Normaali	"Afrikka, sarvikuonojen maa"
Week 29	Mory Kanté	"Yé ké yé ké"
Week 30	Mory Kanté	"Yé ké yé ké"
Week 31	Mory Kanté	"Yé ké yé ké"
Week 32	Mory Kanté	"Yé ké yé ké"
Week 33	Ofra Haza	"Im Nin'alu"
Week 34	Kylie Minogue	"The Loco-Motion"
Week 35	Kylie Minogue	"The Loco-Motion"
Week 36	Kylie Minogue	"The Loco-Motion"
Week 37	Kylie Minogue	"The Loco-Motion"
Week 38	Metallica	"Harvester of Sorrow"
Week 39	J. Karjalainen ja Mustat lasit	"Hän"
Week 40	Pet Shop Boys	"Domino Dancing"
Week 41	Pet Shop Boys	"Domino Dancing"
Week 42	Pet Shop Boys	"Domino Dancing"
Week 43	Pet Shop Boys	"Domino Dancing"
Week 44	Pet Shop Boys	"Domino Dancing"
Week 45	Bananarama	"Love, Truth and Honesty"
Week 46	Yazz & The Plastic Population	"Stand Up for Your Love Rights"
Week 47	Yazz & The Plastic Population	"Stand Up for Your Love Rights"
Week 48	Yazz & The Plastic Population	"Stand Up for Your Love Rights"
Week 49	Spagna	"I Wanna Be Your Wife"
Week 50	Michael Jackson	"Smooth Criminal"
Week 51	Michael Jackson	"Smooth Criminal"
Week 52	Stone	"Back to the Stone Age"
