= List of NME number-one singles of the 1980s =

NME (or New Musical Express) is a British weekly pop music newspaper which now exists only online. NME was the first record chart in the United Kingdom based on sales having imitated an idea started in American Billboard magazine on 14 November 1952. From 1960, Record Retailer began compiling a chart and this is regarded by The Official Charts Company and Guinness' British Hit Singles & Albums as the canonical source for the British singles chart. Prior to 15 February 1969, when the British Market Research Bureau (BMRB) chart was established as part of a joint commission by Record Retailer and the BBC, there was no one universally accepted or official source and many periodicals compiled their own chart. Nevertheless, in the 1960s, NME had the biggest circulation of charts in the decade and was most widely followed. Although not regarded as the primary source for UK charts, NME continued to compile an independent chart until 11 June 1988 (Melody Maker ended its own independently compiled chart the preceding week on 4 June). It was the longest independently compiled chart and, when it ceased, NME published the Market Research Information Bureau chart. From 19 February 1983 to 22 September 1984, the new NME chart was broadcast weekly on Capital Radio's Pick of the Pops Take Two, presented by Alan Freeman; this show also featured archive NME charts.

Notable differences when compared to the official chart run by BMRB and, later, Gallup are an additional two number-one singles in the decade for Rick Astley, David Bowie, Spandau Ballet and Phil Collins. Significantly, Tears for Fears' song "Everybody Wants to Rule the World" spent three weeks at the top of the NME chart although it never topped the Gallup chart. Additionally, as well as making number one on the NME chart and not the official chart, a-ha's "Take On Me" and Ultravox's "Vienna" were also in the top five best-selling singles of their year. Eighteen acts achieved a number-one single on the NME chart but never had an official number-one single (Note: Altered Images, The Assembly, Bomb the Bass, Randy Crawford, Dire Straits, King, Jona Lewie, Lipps Inc, Liquid Gold, Abigail Mead and Nigel Goulding, Ennio Morricone, Robbie Nevil, Ph.D., The Pointer Sisters, Starsound, Tears for Fears, Ultravox, and Dionne Warwick never had an official number-one single) although two of these had songs they had written reach number one when performed by another artist. (Note: Ennio Morricone's theme "The Good, the Bad and the Ugly" was a number one for Hugo Montenegro and Tears for Fears' song "Mad World" reached number one when performed by Gary Jules.)

== Number-one singles ==
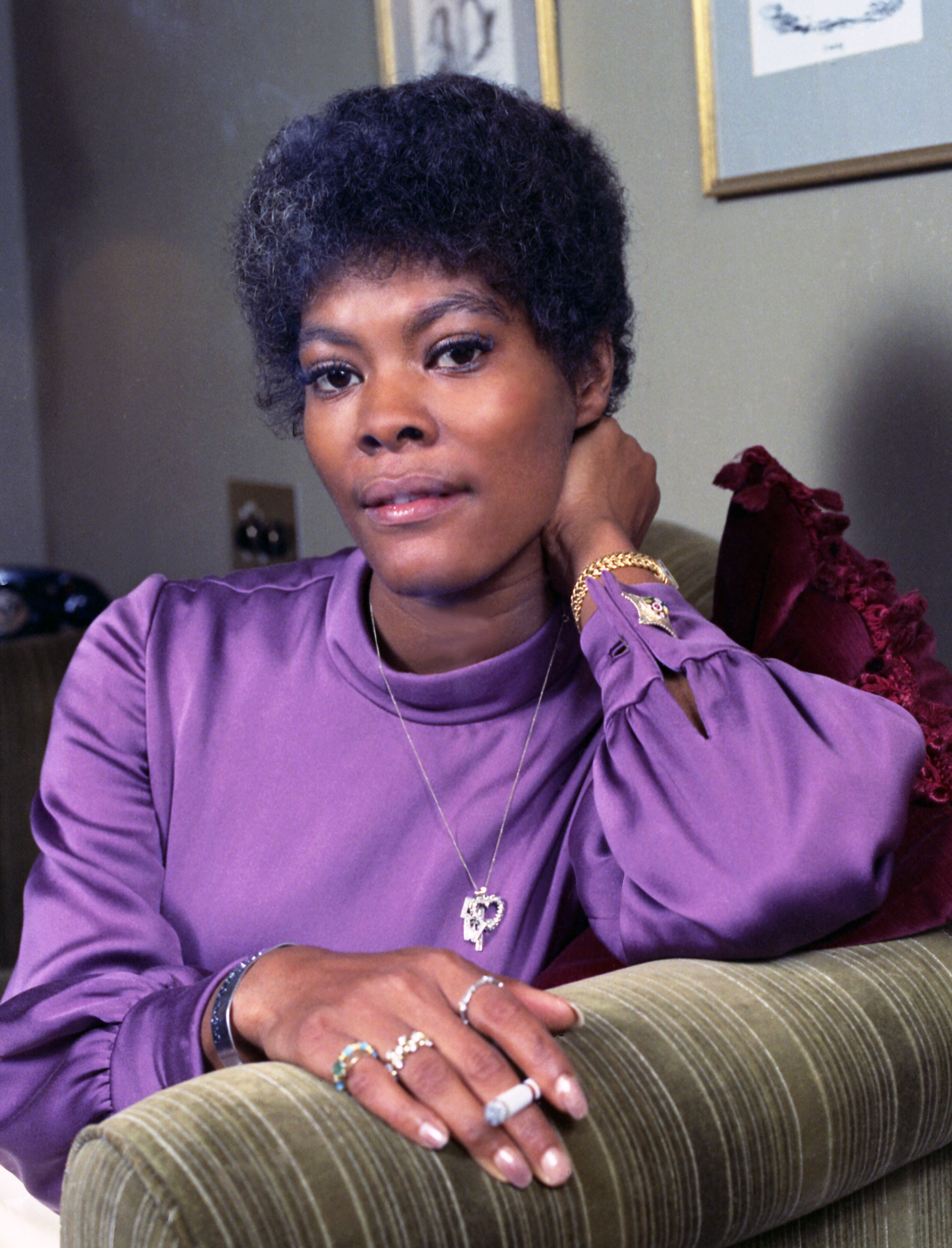
Dionne Warwick was one of 18 acts in the 1980s who made number one in NME but never had a number one on the Official Charts.

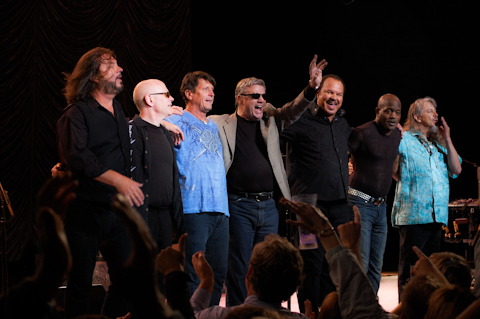
The Steve Miller Band (pictured in 2009) had their first number one on the NME chart (with "Abracadabra") a decade before they had their first "official" number one.

Key
‡	The song did not reach number one on the BMRB which later became the Gallup chart which is considered as the official chart after 15 February 1969.
[nb #]	The song spent a week at number one where it shared the top spot with another song.

No.	Artist (Note: The names, singles, week-ending dates and consecutive duration of the number-ones are from NME.)	Single	Reached number one	Weeks at number one
1980
488	Pretenders	"Brass in Pocket"	19 January 1980	2
489	Madness	"My Girl" ‡	2 February 1980	1
490	The Specials	The Special A.K.A. Live! (Note: This number-one record was not a single but a five-track extended play (EP) with "Too Much Too Young" as the lead track. The rules now require at most four distinct songs to be eligible for the UK Singles Chart. Although the EP is credited to The Special A.K.A. on the record sleeve the record label credits The Specials.)	9 February 1980	1
491	Kenny Rogers	"Coward of the County"	16 February 1980	2
492	Blondie	"Atomic"	1 March 1980	3
493	Fern Kinney	"Together We Are Beautiful"	22 March 1980	1
494	The Jam	"Going Underground"	29 March 1980	2
495	Liquid Gold	"Dance Yourself Dizzy" ‡	12 April 1980	2
496	Blondie	"Call Me"	26 April 1980	2
497	Dexy's Midnight Runners	"Geno"	10 May 1980	1
498	Johnny Logan	"What's Another Year"	17 May 1980	2
499	Hot Chocolate	"No Doubt About It" ‡	31 May 1980	1
500	M*A*S*H	"Theme from M*A*S*H (Suicide is Painless)"	7 June 1980	2
501	Lipps Inc	"Funkytown" ‡	21 June 1980	1
502	Don McLean	"Crying"	28 June 1980	2
503	Olivia Newton-John and the Electric Light Orchestra	"Xanadu"	12 July 1980	3
504	Odyssey	"Use It Up and Wear It Out"	2 August 1980	1
505	Diana Ross	"Upside Down" ‡	9 August 1980	1
506	ABBA	"The Winner Takes It All"	16 August 1980	2
507	David Bowie	"Ashes to Ashes"	30 August 1980	2
508	The Jam	"Start!"	13 September 1980	1
509	Randy Crawford	"One Day I'll Fly Away" ‡	20 September 1980	2
510	The Police	"Don't Stand So Close to Me"	4 October 1980	4
511	Barbra Streisand	"Woman in Love"	1 November 1980	3
512	Blondie	"The Tide Is High"	22 November 1980	2
513	ABBA	"Super Trouper"	6 December 1980	2
514	Jona Lewie	"Stop the Cavalry" ‡	20 December 1980	2 (Note: There was no chart published for the week ending 27 December 1980. In the preceding week, "Stop the Cavalry" was the number-one single. In the next published chart, "(Just Like) Starting Over" claimed the top spot.)
1981
515	John Lennon	"(Just Like) Starting Over"	3 January 1981	1
516	John Lennon	"Imagine"	10 January 1981	4
517	Phil Collins	"In the Air Tonight" ‡	7 February 1981	2
518	Ultravox	"Vienna" ‡	21 February 1981	1
519	Joe Dolce Music Theatre	"Shaddap You Face"	28 February 1981	2
520	Roxy Music	"Jealous Guy"	14 March 1981	2
521	Shakin' Stevens	"This Ole House"	28 March 1981	3
522	Bucks Fizz	"Making Your Mind Up"	18 April 1981	2
523	Ennio Morricone	"Chi Mai (Theme from The Life and Times of David Lloyd George)" ‡	2 May 1981	1
524	Starsound	"Stars on 45" ‡	9 May 1981	1
525	Adam and the Ants	"Stand and Deliver"	16 May 1981	4
526	Smokey Robinson	"Being with You"	13 June 1981	2
527	Michael Jackson	"One Day In Your Life"	27 June 1981	3
528	The Specials	"Ghost Town"	18 July 1981	2
529	Spandau Ballet	"Chant No. 1 (I Don't Need This Pressure On)" ‡	1 August 1981	1
530	Shakin' Stevens	"Green Door"	8 August 1981	1
531	Stevie Wonder	"Happy Birthday" ‡	15 August 1981	1
re	Shakin' Stevens	"Green Door"	22 August 1981	2
532	Aneka	"Japanese Boy"	5 September 1981	1
533	Soft Cell	"Tainted Love"	12 September 1981	1
534	Adam and the Ants	"Prince Charming"	19 September 1981	5
535	Dave Stewart and Barbara Gaskin	"It's My Party"	24 October 1981	2
536	Altered Images	"Happy Birthday" ‡	7 November 1981	1
537	The Police	"Every Little Thing She Does Is Magic"	14 November 1981	2
538	Queen and David Bowie	"Under Pressure"	28 November 1981	2
539	Julio Iglesias	"Begin the Beguine (Volver A Empezar)"	12 December 1981	1
540	The Human League	"Don't You Want Me"	19 December 1981	2 (Note: There was no chart published for the week ending 26 December 1981. In the preceding week, "Don't You Want Me" was the number-one single. In the next published chart, "One of Us" claimed the top spot.)
1982
541	ABBA	"One of Us" ‡	2 January 1982	1
re	The Human League	"Don't You Want Me"	9 January 1982	1
542	Bucks Fizz	"The Land of Make Believe"	16 January 1982	2
543	Kraftwerk	"Computer Love" / "The Model"	30 January 1982	3
544	The Jam	"Town Called Malice"	20 February 1982	3
545	Tight Fit	"The Lion Sleeps Tonight"	13 March 1982	3
546	Goombay Dance Band	"Seven Tears"	3 April 1982	2
547	Bucks Fizz	"My Camera Never Lies"	17 April 1982	2
548	Paul McCartney and Stevie Wonder	"Ebony and Ivory"	1 May 1982	2
549	Ph.D.	"I Won't Let You Down" ‡	15 May 1982	1
550	Nicole	"A Little Peace"	22 May 1982	1
551	Adam Ant	"Goody Two Shoes"	29 May 1982	1
552	Madness	"House of Fun"	5 June 1982	2
re	Adam Ant	"Goody Two Shoes"	19 June 1982	2
553	Charlene	"I've Never Been to Me"	3 July 1982	1
554	Captain Sensible	"Happy Talk"	10 July 1982	1
555	Steve Miller Band	"Abracadabra" ‡	17 July 1982	1
556	Irene Cara	"Fame"	24 July 1982	2
557	Dexy's Midnight Runners	"Come On Eileen"	7 August 1982	4
558	Survivor	"Eye of the Tiger"	4 September 1982	3
559	Dire Straits	"Private Investigations" ‡	25 September 1982	1
560	The Jam	"The Bitterest Pill" ‡	2 October 1982	1
561	Musical Youth	"Pass the Dutchie"	9 October 1982	2
562	Culture Club	"Do You Really Want to Hurt Me"	23 October 1982	3
563	Eddy Grant	"I Don't Wanna Dance"	13 November 1982	2
564	Dionne Warwick	"Heartbreaker" ‡	27 November 1982	1
565	The Human League	"Mirror Man" ‡	4 December 1982	1
566	The Jam	"Beat Surrender"	18 December 1982	1
567	Culture Club	"Time (Clock of the Heart)" ‡	25 December 1982	2 (Note: There was no chart published for the week ending 1 January 1983. In the preceding week, "Time (Clock of the Heart)" was the number-one single. In the next published chart, "Save Your Love" claimed the top spot.)
1983
568	Renée and Renato	"Save Your Love"	8 January 1983	1
569	Phil Collins	"You Can't Hurry Love"	15 January 1983	2
570	Men at Work	"Down Under"	29 January 1983	3
571	Kajagoogoo	"Too Shy"	19 February 1983	2
572	Michael Jackson	"Billie Jean"	5 March 1983	2
573	Bonnie Tyler	"Total Eclipse of the Heart"	19 March 1983	2
574	Duran Duran	"Is There Something I Should Know?"	2 April 1983	2
575	David Bowie	"Let's Dance"	16 April 1983	3
576	Spandau Ballet	"True"	7 May 1983	4
577	New Edition	"Candy Girl"	4 June 1983	1
578	The Police	"Every Breath You Take"	11 June 1983	2
579	David Bowie	"China Girl" ‡	25 June 1983	1
re	The Police	"Every Breath You Take"	2 July 1983	1
580	Rod Stewart	"Baby Jane"	9 July 1983	1
581	Paul Young	"Wherever I Lay My Hat (That's My Home)"	16 July 1983	5
582	KC and the Sunshine Band	"Give It Up"	20 August 1983	1
583	Spandau Ballet	"Gold" ‡	27 August 1983	2
584	UB40	"Red Red Wine"	10 September 1983	3
585	Culture Club	"Karma Chameleon"	1 October 1983	6
586	Billy Joel	"Uptown Girl"	12 November 1983	3
587	The Assembly	"Never Never" ‡	3 December 1983	1
588	Paul Young	"Love of the Common People" ‡	10 December 1983	1
589	The Flying Pickets	"Only You"	17 December 1983	5 (Note: There was no chart published for the week ending 31 December 1983. For the two weeks preceding and succeeding the omitted chart week, "Only You" held the number-one spot.)
1984
590	Paul McCartney	"Pipes of Peace"	21 January 1984	1
591	Frankie Goes to Hollywood	"Relax"	28 January 1984	3
592	Queen	"Radio Ga Ga" ‡	18 February 1984	1
re	Frankie Goes to Hollywood	"Relax"	25 February 1984	1
593	Nena	"99 Red Balloons"	3 March 1984	4
594	Lionel Richie	"Hello"	31 March 1984	5
595	Phil Collins	"Against All Odds (Take a Look at Me Now)" ‡	5 May 1984	1
596	Duran Duran	"The Reflex"	12 May 1984	2
597	The Pointer Sisters	"Automatic" ‡	26 May 1984	2
598	Wham!	"Wake Me Up Before You Go-Go"	9 June 1984	2
599	Frankie Goes to Hollywood	"Two Tribes"	23 June 1984	8
600	George Michael	"Careless Whisper"	18 August 1984	3
601	Stevie Wonder	"I Just Called to Say I Love You"	8 September 1984	6
602	Culture Club	"The War Song" ‡	20 October 1984	1
603	Wham!	"Freedom"	27 October 1984	2
604	Chaka Khan	"I Feel for You"	17 November 1984	3
605	Jim Diamond	"I Should Have Known Better"	8 December 1984	1
606	Band Aid	"Do They Know It's Christmas?"	15 December 1984	5 (Note: There was no chart published for the week ending 29 December 1984. For the two weeks preceding and succeeding the omitted chart week, "Do They Know It's Christmas?" held the number-one spot.)
1985
607	Wham!	"Everything She Wants" / "Last Christmas" ‡ (Note: "Last Christmas" peaked at number two in the UK Singles Chart on its original release in December 1984, but eventually reached number one on the chart week ending 7 January 2021.)	19 January 1985	1
608	Foreigner	"I Want to Know What Love Is"	26 January 1985	2
609	Elaine Paige and Barbara Dickson	"I Know Him So Well"	9 February 1985	1
610	King	"Love and Pride" ‡	16 February 1985	1
re	Elaine Paige and Barbara Dickson	"I Know Him So Well"	23 February 1985	1
611	Dead or Alive	"You Spin Me Round (Like a Record)"	9 March 1985	2
612	Philip Bailey (duet with Phil Collins)	"Easy Lover"	23 March 1985	3
613	Frankie Goes to Hollywood	"Welcome to the Pleasuredome" ‡	13 April 1985	1
614	Tears for Fears	"Everybody Wants to Rule the World" ‡	20 April 1985	3
615	Phyllis Nelson	"Move Closer"	11 May 1985	1
616	Paul Hardcastle	"19"	18 May 1985	5
617	The Crowd	"You'll Never Walk Alone"	22 June 1985	1
618	Madonna	"Crazy for You" ‡	29 June 1985	1
619	Sister Sledge	"Frankie"	6 July 1985	3
620	Eurythmics	"There Must Be an Angel (Playing with My Heart)"	27 July 1985	2
621	Madonna	"Into the Groove"	10 August 1985	4
622	UB40 and Chrissie Hynde	"I Got You Babe"	7 September 1985	1
623	David Bowie and Mick Jagger	"Dancing in the Street"	14 September 1985	3
624	Midge Ure	"If I Was"	5 October 1985	1
625	Jennifer Rush	"The Power of Love"	12 October 1985	3
626	a-ha	"Take On Me" ‡	2 November 1985	1
re	Jennifer Rush	"The Power of Love"	9 November 1985	1
627	Elton John	"Nikita" ‡	16 November 1985	1
628	Feargal Sharkey	"A Good Heart"	23 November 1985	2
629	Wham!	"I'm Your Man"	7 December 1985	2
630	Whitney Houston	"Saving All My Love for You"	21 December 1985	3 (Note: There was no chart published for the week ending 28 December 1985. For the weeks preceding and succeeding the omitted chart week, "Saving All My Love for You" held the number-one spot.)
1986
631	Pet Shop Boys	"West End Girls"	11 January 1986	2
632	a-ha	"The Sun Always Shines on T.V."	25 January 1986	3
633	Billy Ocean	"When the Going Gets Tough, the Tough Get Going"	15 February 1986	4
634	Diana Ross	"Chain Reaction"	15 March 1986	2
635	David Bowie	"Absolute Beginners" ‡	29 March 1986	1
636	Cliff Richard and The Young Ones	"Living Doll"	5 April 1986	3
637	George Michael	"A Different Corner"	26 April 1986	3
638	Falco	"Rock Me Amadeus"	17 May 1986	1
639	Spitting Image	"The Chicken Song"	24 May 1986	2
640	Doctor and the Medics	"Spirit in the Sky"	7 June 1986	4
641	Wham!	"The Edge of Heaven"	5 July 1986	1
642	Madonna	"Papa Don't Preach"	12 July 1986	3
643	Chris de Burgh	"The Lady in Red"	2 August 1986	3
644	Boris Gardiner	"I Want to Wake Up with You"	23 August 1986	3
645	The Communards	"Don't Leave Me This Way"	13 September 1986	5
646	Madonna	"True Blue"	18 October 1986	1
647	Nick Berry	"Every Loser Wins"	25 October 1986	3
648	Berlin	"Take My Breath Away"	15 November 1986	3
649	Europe	"The Final Countdown"	6 December 1986	2
650	The Housemartins	"Caravan of Love"	20 December 1986	3 (Note: There was no chart published for the week ending 27 December 1986. For the weeks preceding and succeeding the omitted chart week, "Caravan of Love" held the number-one spot.)
1987
651	Jackie Wilson	"Reet Petite (The Sweetest Girl in Town)"	10 January 1987	3
652	Robbie Nevil	"C'est La Vie" ‡	31 January 1987	1
653	Aretha Franklin and George Michael	"I Knew You Were Waiting (For Me)"	7 February 1987	3
654	Ben E. King	"Stand by Me"	28 February 1987	3
655	Boy George	"Everything I Own"	21 March 1987	1
656	Mel and Kim	"Respectable"	28 March 1987	2
657	Ferry Aid	"Let It Be"	11 April 1987	2
658	Madonna	"La Isla Bonita"	25 April 1987	3
659	Starship	"Nothing's Gonna Stop Us Now"	16 May 1987	3
660	Whitney Houston	"I Wanna Dance with Somebody (Who Loves Me)"	6 June 1987	3
661	The Firm	"Star Trekkin'"	27 June 1987	2
662	Pet Shop Boys	"It's a Sin"	11 July 1987	3
663	Madonna	"Who's That Girl"	1 August 1987	1
664	Los Lobos	"La Bamba"	8 August 1987	2
665	Michael Jackson	"I Just Can't Stop Loving You"	22 August 1987	2
666	Rick Astley	"Never Gonna Give You Up"	5 September 1987	4
667	M|A|R|R|S	"Pump Up the Volume"	3 October 1987	2
668	Abigail Mead and Nigel Goulding	"I Want To Be Your Drill Instructor" ‡	17 October 1987	1
669	Bee Gees	"You Win Again"	24 October 1987	2
670	George Michael	"Faith" ‡	7 November 1987	1
re	Bee Gees	"You Win Again"	14 November 1987	1
671	T'Pau	"China in Your Hand"	21 November 1987	3
672	Rick Astley	"When I Fall in Love" ‡	19 December 1987	2 (Note: There was no chart published for the week ending 26 December 1987. In the preceding week, "When I Fall in Love" was the number-one single. In the three next published charts, "Always on My Mind" claimed the top spot.)
1988
673	Pet Shop Boys	"Always on My Mind"	2 January 1988	3
674	Belinda Carlisle	"Heaven Is a Place on Earth"	23 January 1988	2
675	Tiffany	"I Think We're Alone Now"	6 February 1988	2
676	Kylie Minogue	"I Should Be So Lucky"	20 February 1988	2
677	Bomb the Bass	"Beat Dis" ‡	5 March 1988	1
678	Rick Astley	"Together Forever" ‡	19 March 1988	1
679	Aswad	"Don't Turn Around"	26 March 1988	3
680	Pet Shop Boys	"Heart"	16 April 1988	2
681	S-Express	"Theme from S-Express"	30 April 1988	2
682	Fairground Attraction	"Perfect"	14 May 1988	1
683	Wet Wet Wet; Billy Bragg and Cara Tivey	"With a Little Help from My Friends" "She's Leaving Home"	21 May 1988	4
