= Judy Boucher =

Reggae and R&B singer

- Born: Saint Vincent, Caribbean
- Genres: Reggae, reggae-pop, lovers rock, R&B
- Occupations: Singer, songwriter
- Instrument: Vocals
- Years active: 1970s–present
- Labels: Orbitone, Kufe

Judy Boucher (born in St. Vincent in the Caribbean) is a reggae and R&B singer. Her first solo song "Dreaming of a Little Island" was a hit in the reggae charts in 1985, and she is best known for her international hit single "Can't Be with You Tonight", which reached No. 2 on the UK Singles Chart in April 1987.

== Music career ==
After being in her brother's band Judy Jack and the Beanstalk, she later became a solo artist. Her music career took a giant step circa 1970. In 1985, Felix Da Silva, a local songwriter, wanted a singer to cover his songs and Boucher was able to record several of them, including "Dreaming of a Little Island", which enjoyed the No. 1 slot in the reggae charts and was subsequently used as the Jamaica Tourist Board's theme tune. An album was released, entitled Can't Be with You Tonight which would change the "ordinary country girl" into an international entertainer by the end of 1987. The title track was released as a single and became a worldwide hit in 1987, also peaking at No. 2 in the UK.

Lizzie Webb, TV's exercise queen at the time, heard the song while driving home and decided to use it as her exercise tune. The UK public began enquiring about it. Boucher's producer released it to satisfy the demand which gave Boucher her first national entry into the charts. The song hit No. 1 during mid-week, but then remained at No. 2 for four weeks in the UK and was also a hit in the Netherlands, Ireland, Switzerland, France, Greece, Spain and the Philippines.

Her Belgian tour remains one of the highlights of her career; it was quite momentous. At an appearance at one stadium, there were 40,000 people with lighted candles chanting "Judy Boucher" as she sang. A surprise call also came from South Africa informing her of being a massive hit there. She took up the invitation to visit but due to the boycott at the time, was unable to perform. However, she was asked to tour Swaziland, Namibia and several other African countries, appearing on TV, radio and in clubs. The response was overwhelming, with people turning up with gifts of all descriptions – animals, gold, clothes etc.

Her follow-up single, "You Caught My Eye" gave Boucher another national hit, peaking at No. 18 in the UK. She did a tour of the Middle East, including Dubai and Abu Dhabi of the UAE. In 1988–89, Boucher decided to take a break, returning in late 1989 with a change of record company and producer.

== Recognition ==
She holds the record for being the first female from the Caribbean to have the longest stay in the national charts with fourteen weeks in 1987.

In recognition of her achievements, Boucher was invited by the government of St. Vincent as their special guest of honour and remains an ambassador for her country.

== Discography ==
=== Albums ===
Year	Album	UK
1986	Can't Be with You Tonight	95
1993	Tears on My Pillow	—
1994	Devoted to You	—
1996	Take Me as I Am	—
1998	Take Your Memory with You	—
2000	Can't Be with You Tonight (CD version)	—
2001	New Way to Say Love	—
2003	Just the Two of Us	—
2003	Not This Time	—
2005	The Best of Judy Boucher (compilation, released in South Africa)	—
2007	Sunshine and Dreams	—
"—" denotes releases that did not chart.

=== Singles ===
Year	Single	UK	Certifications
1985	"Dreaming of a Little Island"	—	
1986	"My Heart Is Yearning"	—	
1986	"Lovely Paradise"	—	
1987	"Can't Be with You Tonight"	2	BPI: Silver
1987	"You Caught My Eye"	18	
1990	"Almost Certainly"	—	
1992	"Sweet Dreams" / "Beneath Still Waters"	—	
1992	"Tears on My Pillow" / "Am I That Easy to Forget"	—	
"—" denotes releases that did not chart.
