= Frankie (Sister Sledge song) =

1985 single by Sister Sledge

Single by Sister Sledge

from the album When the Boys Meet the Girls
- B-side: "Hold Out Poppy"
- Released: May 1985
- Genre: Pop
- Label: Atlantic
- Songwriter: Denise Rich
- Producer: Nile Rodgers

Sister Sledge singles chronology
"We Are Family (Bernard Edwards Remix)" (1984)	"Frankie" (1985)	"Dancing on the Jagged Edge" (1985)

"Frankie" is a song by American vocal group Sister Sledge, released in 1985 as the first single from their eighth studio album, When the Boys Meet the Girls (1985).

== Overview ==
The song was written by Denise Rich (under the pseudonym "Joy Denny") after dreaming while on a flight from the United States to Switzerland. According to the Now That's What I Call Music 5 album (on which the song appears), the song was written about Frank Sinatra.

The song was produced by Chic's Nile Rodgers, who had co-produced the sisters' earlier hits such as "He's the Greatest Dancer" and "We Are Family". The sisters suggested the song to him, but he hated it on first hearing. A week later, he went back to them saying he could not stop singing it, and so he insisted that the group record it.

A marked contrast to the disco cuts which had made them internationally famous in the late 1970s, this girl-pop number became a hit on the UK Singles Chart, spending four weeks at number one in June and July 1985. It fared much less well in the US where it peaked at number 75 on the Billboard Hot 100, No. 32 R&B and No. 15 Adult Contemporary.

"Frankie" was the fifth best-selling single of 1985 with 698,000 sold copies in the United Kingdom.

== Reception ==
In Smash Hits, Dave Rimmer said it was "a song so excruciatingly awful that I nearly broke the record player in the frenzy to take it off."

== Charts ==
=== Weekly charts ===
Chart (1985)	Peak position
Australia (Kent Music Report)	10
Austria (Ö3 Austria Top 40)	27
Belgium (Ultratop 50 Flanders)	4
Canada Adult Contemporary (RPM)	15
Europe (European Hot 100 Singles)	8
Ireland (IRMA)	1
Netherlands (Dutch Top 40)	9
Netherlands (Single Top 100)	10
New Zealand (Recorded Music NZ)	3
Sweden (Sverigetopplistan)	14
UK Singles (Official Charts)	1
US Billboard Hot 100	75
US Adult Contemporary (Billboard)	15
US Hot Black Singles (Billboard)	32
West Germany (GfK)	13

=== Year-end charts ===
Chart (1985)	Position
Australia (Kent Music Report)	81
Belgium (Ultratop)	36
Netherlands (Dutch Top 40)	62
Netherlands (Single Top 100)	59

== Certifications ==
Region	Certification	Certified units/sales
United Kingdom (BPI)	Gold	500,000^{^}
^{^} Shipments figures based on certification alone.
