= Stop the Cavalry =

Single by Jona Lewie
- B-side: "Laughing Tonight"
- Released: 21 November 1980
- Studio: Morgan Studios, London
- Genre: Synth-pop; Christmas
- Length: 2:55
- Label: Stiff
- Songwriter: Jona Lewie
- Producers: Bob Andrews; Jona Lewie

Jona Lewie singles chronology
"Big Shot – Momentarily" (1980)	"Stop the Cavalry" (1980)	"Louise (We Get It Right)" (1981)

"Stop the Cavalry" is an anti-war song and a Christmas song written and performed by the English musician Jona Lewie, released in 1980. The song peaked at number three on the UK Singles Chart in December 1980, at one point being kept from number one by two re-issued songs by John Lennon, who had been murdered on 8 December that year. Initially a stand-alone single, the song was included on Lewie's album Heart Skips Beat which was released nearly two years later.

== Background and composition ==
Lewie wrote the song while living at home with his parents. He told PRS for Music, "I was playing about on my grandmother's piano and came up with a particular refrain I liked and kept coming back to. A little germ of an idea had been planted in my head, but one that didn't come fully into fruition for about the next five months. The first lyrics I thought of were actually 'can you stop the gallantry', about the gallant soldiers of the Crimean War and especially the charge of the Light Brigade. This later became "Stop the Cavalry" and I widened the perspective of the song to be about all wars and all soldiers." He would later use an eight-track recorder to improve the song which was then taken up by Dave Robinson at Stiff Records. After Lewie signed to Stiff Records, founder Dave Robinson dismissed the demo as "just another antiwar song", but after rearrangement – and Lewie playing the now iconic refrain on a kazoo – it proved a hit with Robinson. A Salvation Army brass band was then recruited to play the main melody. "The song actually had nothing to do with Christmas when I wrote it," Lewie told the Daily Express in 2005. "There is one line about [the soldier] being on the front and missing his girlfriend: 'I wish I was at home for Christmas.' The record company picked up on that from a marketing perspective, and added a tubular bell."

The lyrics of the song mention cavalry and Winston Churchill (who served as the First Lord of the Admiralty in the first year of the First World War, prior to serving in the trenches himself), but it breaks with the First World War theme with references to nuclear fallout and the line "I have had to fight, almost every night, down throughout these centuries". Lewie described the song's soldier as being "a bit like the eternal soldier at the Arc de Triomphe". At the time of the song's release there was an increase in tension between the Western Bloc and the Eastern Bloc, with American-controlled nuclear cruise missiles being stationed in the UK and a renewed fear of nuclear war, which was referenced in the lyrical mention of the nuclear fallout zone.

== Music video ==
The song's music video was filmed in Hampstead Heath in London. It is set in the trenches of the First World War, while also featuring Lewie and the Salvation Army brass band walking through the streets.

== Legacy ==
The song peaked at number three on the UK Singles Chart in December 1980, at one point being kept from number one by two re-issued songs by John Lennon, who had been murdered on 8 December that year, before both artists were kept from number one by the school choir song "There's No One Quite Like Grandma".

In an interview for Channel 4's 100 Greatest Christmas Moments, Lewie said that the song was never intended as a Christmas hit, and that it was a protest song. Indeed, some overseas releases (for example, in South Africa and New Zealand) were in the spring rather than at Christmas. The line "Wish I was at home for Christmas", as well as the brass band arrangements made it an appropriately styled song to play around Christmas time. Lewie had said that royalties received from the song account for 50 per cent of his income stream.

According to a 2017 poll conducted by The Irish Times, "Stop the Cavalry" is the fourth most popular Christmas song in Ireland.

In 2022, it was reported that the song was listed as the seventh-highest-royalty-earning Christmas song. According to analysis of PRS for Music figures, it was estimated that the song generates £120,000 of royalties per year.

== Charts ==
Chart (1980–1981)	Peak position
Australia (Kent Music Report)	2
Austria (Ö3 Austria Top 40)	1
Belgium (Ultratop 50 Flanders)	5
France (IFOP)	1
Germany (GfK)	2
Ireland (IRMA)	5
Netherlands (Dutch Top 40)	9
Netherlands (Single Top 100)	6
New Zealand (Recorded Music NZ)	3
South Africa (Springbok Radio)	4
Sweden (Sverigetopplistan)	13
Switzerland (Schweizer Hitparade)	4
UK Singles (Official Charts)	3

Chart (2006)	Peak position
UK Singles (OCC)	130

Chart (2007)	Peak position
UK Singles (Official Charts)	48

Chart (2008)	Peak position
UK Singles (OCC)	118

Chart (2009)	Peak position
UK Singles (OCC)	119

Chart (2010)	Peak position
UK Singles (OCC)	159

Chart (2011)	Peak position
UK Singles (Official Charts)	86

Chart (2012)	Peak position
UK Singles (OCC)	158

Chart (2013)	Peak position
UK Singles (OCC)	186

Chart (2015)	Peak position
Ireland (IRMA)	86
UK Singles (Official Charts)	82

Chart (2016–2017)	Peak position
Ireland (IRMA)	69
UK Singles (Official Charts)	58

Chart (2017–2018)	Peak position
Ireland (IRMA)	44
Netherlands (Single Top 100)	77
UK Singles (Official Charts)	61

Chart (2018–2019)	Peak position
Germany (GfK)	95
Ireland (IRMA)	87
Netherlands (Single Top 100)	70
UK Singles (Official Charts)	85

Chart (2019–2020)	Peak position
Ireland (IRMA)	93
Netherlands (Single Top 100)	81
UK Singles (Official Charts)	56

Chart (2020–2021)	Peak position
Germany (GfK)	91
Netherlands (Single Top 100)	88
UK Singles (Official Charts)	77

Chart (2021)	Peak position
Ireland (IRMA)	60
UK Singles (Official Charts)	34

== Certifications ==
Region	Certification	Certified units/sales
United Kingdom (BPI)	Platinum	600,000^{‡}
^{‡} Sales+streaming figures based on certification alone.

== See also ==
- List of anti-war songs
