= Phoenix Festival =

Music festival held from 1993 to 1997

The Phoenix Festival was set up by John Vincent Power of the Mean Fiddler Music Group in 1993 as an alternative to the established Glastonbury and Reading Festivals. It was held at Long Marston Airfield near Stratford-upon-Avon, England, and was one of the first four-day festivals in Britain.

== History ==
The first year of the festival (1993) featured headline performances by Sonic Youth, Hole, Faith No More and The Black Crowes, and included other notable acts such as Manic Street Preachers, Julian Cope, The Young Gods and House of Pain. However, the event was marred by controversy. Travelers refused free entry, blocked the entrance meaning many spent their Friday night in their vehicles in long queues. Festival goers were made to put out camp fires and turn off sound systems at midnight. These rules were in contrast to the 24-hour culture of the Glastonbury Festival, with which many of those present at Phoenix were familiar. There were even demands for refunds, and the festival's reputation was marred from the outset. The enforcement of these rules by security staff led to many of the festival goers showing their displeasure in no uncertain terms. Fencing and light rigs were toppled, fires set and physical clashes between festival goers and security staff also occurred.

The festival never really recovered from its poor reception, and although it attracted consistently popular acts, festival goers were less than happy with the site (an old airstrip) and there were also complaints about the prices on site. Such were the problems with security that when the Big Top managed by experimental theatre company 'Dancin Dog' was three times over capacity no staff were available to remedy the situation leading to fights between performers and audience and artists unable to leave the stage resulting in crowds demanding more for several hours and performers continuing until they collapsed from exhaustion and in fear for their lives.

Problems with the event reached a climax in 1996 when many festival goers missed David Bowie on the Thursday night due to problems letting people on site. Having sold out that year for the first time, due to the Glastonbury Festival taking its usual year off (once in every five years in a cycle), the organisers struggled to cope with the crowds and extreme heat. Temperatures on site exceeded thirty degrees Celsius on all days. The weekend was further marred with problems with water being unavailable in parts of the site. The event was notable for the fact that the Sex Pistols headlined their first major UK festival that weekend.

The festival continued for one more year but could never compete with its main rival, the Glastonbury Festival. The 1998 Phoenix event was cancelled due to poor ticket sales, but some acts were moved to that year's Reading Festival.

In July 2011, Vince Power announced his intention to resurrect the festival in his introduction to the programme of the Hop Farm Festival. Power wrote: "For those of you who remember the Phoenix Festival, it's my intention to resurrect this festival next year as Glastonbury is taking a break."

== Line ups ==
=== 1993 ===
The 1993 Phoenix was held from 16 to 18 July at Long Marston, Stratford-Upon-Avon.

Phoenix Stage
Friday	Saturday	Sunday
Sonic Youth; Julian Cope; The Disposable Heroes of Hiphoprisy; Parliament-Funkadelic (No Show - House Of Pain played this slot); Hole; The Fatima Mansions; The God Machine; Jacob's Mouse	Faith No More; House of Pain; The Young Gods; Björn Again; Fun-Da-Mental; Consolidated; That Petrol Emotion; New Fast Automatic Daffodils; Silverfish; Die Cheerleader	The Black Crowes; Pop Will Eat Itself; Living Colour; Manic Street Preachers; Yothu Yindi; Helmet; Mercury Rev; Bad Religion; Hyperhead; CNN

Zine Stage
Friday	Saturday	Sunday
The Buzzcocks; The Family Cat; Pulp; The Funking Barstewards; Eat; The Pooh Sticks; The Hair and Skin Trading Company; Energy Orchard; Ringo	Billy Bragg; The Men They Couldn't Hang; Martin Stephenson; Red Devils; Trash Can Sinatras; The Fat Lady Sings; Pele; The Tansads; Velocity Girl; Nervous	The Wedding Present; Thousand Yard Stare; Los Lobos; Ian McNabb; A House; Rainer; Kinky Machine; Molly Half Head; The New Cranes

Jazzterrania Stage
Friday	Saturday	Sunday
James Taylor Quartet; Courtney Pine; The Pharcyde; Mother Earth; Jason Rebello; Vibe Tribe	Gil Scott-Heron And The Amnesia Express; Jamiroquai; The Sandals; Corduroy; Keziah Jones; Cypress Hill; John Coltrane Tribute	Gangstarr Quartet with Donald Byrd and Roy Ayers; Steve Williamson's That Fuss Was Us; Jazz Jamaica; Urban Species; Snowboy & The Latin Section; Secret Society

Lime Lizard Stage
Friday	Saturday	Sunday
Utah Saints; Eugenius; Redd Kross; The Moonflowers; Sloan; Band Of Susans; St. Johnny; Sidi Bou Said	Back To The Planet; Dr. Phibes and the House of Wax Equations; Cardiacs; Th' Faith Healers; Senser; Mint 400; Skyscraper; Collapsed Lung; Compulsion	Sheep On Drugs; The Rockingbirds; Stereolab; Matthew Sweet; Bivouac; Cornershop; Credit to the Nation; Strangelove; Radial Spangle; Fretblanket

=== 1994 ===
The 1994 Phoenix was held from 14 to 17 July at Long Marston, Stratford-Upon-Avon.

Phoenix Stage
Thursday	Friday	Saturday	Sunday
stage closed	The Wonder Stuff; Carter USM; The Fall; Squeeze; The Posies; Jah Wobble; The Goats; Fun-Da-Mental; Whiteout	Paul Weller; Pop Will Eat Itself; Ozric Tentacles; Crash Test Dummies; Gil Scott-Heron; Senseless Things; Urban Dance Squad; The Sandals; Baby Chaos; The Red Devils	Iggy Pop; Therapy? Ned's Atomic Dustbin; Killing Joke; Buzzcocks; Magnapop; The Family Cat; NOFX; Blaggers ITA

Vox Stage
Thursday	Friday	Saturday	Sunday
Gary Clail On U Sound System; Bim Sherman; Little Axe; Adrian Sherwood	The Pogues; John Cale; Kirsty MacColl; Tom Robinson; The Trash Can Sinatras; David Gray; The Coalporters; Ben Harper	The Beautiful South; The Blue Aeroplanes; Terry Hall; The Divine Comedy; Eddi Reader; The Bible; My Life Story; Marion Cast; Thrum	Inspiral Carpets; Renegade Soundwave; A House; Mother Earth; The Grid; Beat Traders; A Certain Ratio; Suns of Arqa; Youthu Yindi; Terry Edwards; Baby Chaos

Melody Maker Stage
Thursday	Friday	Saturday	Sunday
Dodgy; Astralasia T.Rextasy; Land Of Barbara; Head	Spiritualized; Stereolab; Bark Psychosis; Moonshake; Golden Claw; Radial Spangle; ROC; Drugstore; Puppy Love Bomb; Skunk Anansie	Back To The Planet; Swervedriver; Mega City Four; These Animal Men; Voodoo Queens; Gunshot; The Muddie Funksters; Dub War; Rub Ultra; Done Lying Down; Tribute To Nothing	Shellac; Girls Against Boys; Brick Layer Cake; The Raincoats; The Pastels; Bailterspace; Tsunami; Mambo Taxi; AC Acoustics

Jazzterania Stage
Thursday	Friday	Saturday	Sunday
Incognito; Urban Species; Raw Stylus; Ian & Rob	Donald Byrd; Courtney Pine; Greg Osby; Freakpower; Ian & Rob	Galliano; Snowboy; Fishbelly Black; Vibe Tribe	Herbie Hancock; Roy Ayers; Corduroy; D*Note; Jhelisa

Loaded Comedy Stage
Thursday	Friday	Saturday	Sunday
Frank Sidebottom; John Shuttleworth; Kevin Day; Ian Cognito; Phil Kay; Martin Coyote; Mike Hayley; Andre Vincent; Ardal O'Hanlon	Mark Thomas; Jeff Green; Rubber Bishops; Man with Beard; Sean Connery Brotherhood; Alistair MacGowan; Dave Spikey	Lee Evans; Mark Steel; Mark Hurst; Lee Hurst; Linda Smith; Dominic Holland; Hattie Hayridge	Eddie Izzard; Richard Moton; Attila the Stockbroker; Sean Meo; Simon Bligh; Fred MacAulay; Paul Tonkinson; John Moloney; Rhona Cameron

=== 1995 ===
The 1995 Phoenix was held from 13 to 16 July at Long Marston, Stratford-Upon-Avon.

Phoenix Stage (host & DJ: Jo Whiley)
Thursday	Friday	Saturday	Sunday
stage closed	Suede; Bob Dylan; Tricky; Van Morrison; The Fall; The Wedding Present; Chumbawamba; Salad; Velvet Crush	Faith No More; Public Enemy; Terrorvision; Paradise Lost; Body Count; Ice-T; EMF; Senseless Things (no-show); Gallon Drunk; Shootyz Groove; Pitchshifter	Paul Weller; Brand New Heavies; Warren G (no-show); George Clinton & Parliament-Funkadelic; The Charlatans; Underworld; Spearhead; Credit to the Nation; Marion

Melody Maker Stage
Thursday	Friday	Saturday	Sunday
Bootsy Collins; Prophets of Da City	Aztec Camera; Edwyn Collins	Spiritualized Electric Mainline; The Verve; The High Llamas (replaced Nitzer Ebb); Man or Astroman? AC Acoustics; Gorky's Zygotic Mynci	The Wildhearts (no-show); Biohazard; Dog Eat Dog; Honeycrack; Shudder to Think; Joyrider; Schtum

Kiss 100 Stage
Thursday	Friday	Saturday	Sunday
Gil Scott-Heron	Galliano; Normski	Guru's Jazzmatazz; MC 900 Ft. Jesus	James Taylor Quartet; Jessica Lauren

Megadog Stage
Thursday	Friday	Saturday	Sunday
The Orb	Underworld; The Chemical Brothers	Eat Static; Conemelt	Trans-Global Underground; African Headcharge

Comedy Tent
Thursday	Friday	Saturday	Sunday
Lily Savage	Lee Evans; John Otway	Mark Lamarr	Frank Sidebottom

=== 1996 ===
The 1996 Phoenix Festival was held from 18 to 21 July at Long Marston, Stratford-Upon-Avon.

Phoenix Stage
Thursday	Friday	Saturday	Sunday
David Bowie; The Prodigy; Gene; Frank Black; Placebo; Kenickie	Neil Young and Crazy Horse; Alanis Morissette; Manic Street Preachers; Foo Fighters; Dodgy; The Wildhearts; Beck; The Flaming Lips; Ian McNabb; Fun Lovin' Criminals	Björk; Massive Attack; Cypress Hill; Skunk Anansie; Stereolab; Genius/GZA; The Wannadies; Guru's Jazzmatazz; Ruby; Cecil	Sex Pistols; Terrorvision; Echobelly; The Fall; Marion; Coolio; The Cardigans; Drugstore; Honeycrack; Linoleum

Guardian Stage
Thursday	Friday	Saturday	Sunday
Cocteau Twins; Strangelove; The Young Gods; The Aloof; The Dirty Three; Earl Brutus	Lush; G Love & Special Sauce; Bis; Baby Bird; Super Furry Animals; Jonathan Richman; Barenaked Ladies; Dr. Robert; Rare; Perfume; Elcka; Agent Provocateur; Nervous	Shed Seven; Grant Lee Buffalo; Heavy Stereo; 60ft Dolls; Catatonia; Audioweb; No Way Sis; Collapsed Lung; New Kingdom; Scheer; Revelino; Soda	Reef; Longpigs; Compulsion; Dub War; Senser; Kerbdog; Holy Barbarians; Baby Chaos; Send No Flowers; Smaller; Joyrider; 3 Colours Red

Megadog Stage
Thursday	Friday	Saturday	Sunday
Leftfield; Banco de Gaia; Zion Train; Asian Dub Foundation	Carl Cox; The Prodigy; CJ Bolland; System 7 Hardfloor; Darren Emerson; Earth Nation; Outer Active; Alabama 3 J Pac	Grooverider; Goldie; Fabio; Lionrock; Red Snapper; LTJ Bukem; Spring Heel Jack; Baby D Nicolette; Andrew Weatherall; Lamb	Ingrid Schroeder; The Chemical Brothers; Spooky; William Orbit; Slab; The Aloof; James Lavelle; Interact

Jazz Café Stage
Thursday	Friday	Saturday	Sunday
Incognito; Courtney Pine; Raw Stylus; Earthling; Big Cheese All Stars	Guru's Jazzmatazz; Corduroy; Dirty Dozen Brass Band; Nightmares on Wax; Weldon Irvine; Snowboy & The Latin Section; Smith & Mighty; The Brotherhood	Us3; Moloko; Mother Earth; Jazz Passengers feat. Debbie Harry; Terry Callier; Dee C Lee; Jazz Co Tech Dancers; Pucho & The Latin Soul Brothers; Eusebe	James Taylor Quartet; The Pharcyde; Ben Harper; Me'shell; The Specials; Maxwell; Monday Michiru; Attica Blues

=== 1997 ===
The 1997 Phoenix Festival was held from 17 to 20 July at Long Marston, Stratford-Upon-Avon. "David Bowie requested some odd items on his Phoenix rider but came close to not getting a few," recalled promoter Neil Pengelly. "An urgent, eleventh-hour delivery of his bullworker and carrot juicer required a dash through the arena in a golf cart – not a problem until a plucky punter nicked the cart from under the nose of the briefly distracted driver. A Benny Hill-style chase ended when the man dumped the cart and ran off into the crowd. Adding insult to injury, three girls spotted the key still in the cart and ram-raided the cigarette stall."

Main Stage
Thursday	Friday	Saturday	Sunday
Black Grape; Skunk Anansie; Fun Lovin' Criminals; De La Soul; Asian Dub Foundation	The Charlatans; The Lightning Seeds; Shed Seven; Teenage Fanclub; The Wannadies; Beth Orton; Morcheeba; Hurricane#1; Sussed	Jamiroquai; Gabrielle; US3; ABC; Olive; Lamb; Corduroy; The Prisoners; Groove Connection	David Bowie; Orbital; Texas; Faith No More; Billy Bragg; 3 Colours Red; Catatonia; Apollo 440; Arkarna

Guardian Stage
Thursday	Friday	Saturday	Sunday
Spiritualized; Strangelove; Gorky's Zygotic Mynci; Madder Rose; Soul Coughing; Warm Jets	Rollins Band; Republica; Lionrock; Embrace; Travis; Lo Fidelity Allstars; Gold Blade; Smaller; Broadcast; Mogwai; Midget; Libido	Aphex Twin; Sneaker Pimps; 60ft Dolls; Subcircus; Laika; The Candyskins; David Devant & His Spirit Wife; Linoleum; Stereophonics; One Inch Punch; Jolt	Sinéad O'Connor; Shane MacGowan; My Life Story; Drugstore; Luna; Urusei Yatsura; 18 Wheeler; Arnold; Mantaray; Baby Fox; London Community Gospel Choir

Mean Fiddler Stage
Thursday	Friday	Saturday	Sunday
The Specials; Afro-Celt Sound System; Bhundu Boys; The Radiators; Otis, Ed & Ben	Red House Painters; Link Wray; Edward Ball; Nervous; Elliot Green; Coade; Garageland; White Buffalo; Dream City Film Club; The Candidates; The Hitchers; Sintra; Hank Dogs; Hugger Mugger	Gallon Drunk; AC Acoustics; Dr Robert; Dharmas; Gretschen Hofner; The Diggers; The Smiles; The Kaisers; Simon Warner; My Friend The Chocolate Cake; Comfort; Dakota Suite; The Hormones; Pregnant	The Saw Doctors; Transglobal Underground; Moodswings; Dr Didg; Sirenes; Rev Hammer; Sara Sara; Mary Coughlan; Duncan Sheik; Jel; Loot Competition Winner; Baby On Board
