= Flamingoes (band) =

British indie rock band

- Origin: London, England
- Genres: Alternative rock; Britpop
- Years active: 1993–2008
- Label: Pandemonium Records
- Past members: Jude Cook; James Cook; Kevin Matthews; Steve Necchi
- Website: www.flamingoesmusic.com

Flamingoes were an English indie rock band formed in 1993 by twin brothers Jude and James Cook. The band were active during the Britpop era and released two albums before disbanding in 2008.

== History ==
Originally from Hitchin, Hertfordshire, the brothers initially named the band The Shade, with Simon Gilbert, later of Suede, on drums before recruiting drummer Kevin Matthews through an advertisement in Melody Maker. The band was renamed after a line from Roxy Music's "Sunset". Deborah Edgley, former head of press at 4AD, offered to manage them. Soon after, the band won Gary Crowley's Demo Clash on BBC Greater London Radio.

Flamingoes played the New Art Riot gig at the 100 Club in December 1993 with S*M*A*S*H, These Animal Men and Echobelly, attracting media interest centred around the New Wave of New Wave movement. In February 1994, the first single, "The Chosen Few", produced by Pat Collier, was released on the indie label LaLaLand.

In 1994, the band was signed by Pandemonium Records, an indie offshoot of dance label Kickin Records. A second single, "Teenage Emergency", was released in June 1994, followed by "Disappointed" in October. The band then recorded their debut album Plastic Jewels, released in February 1995.

The album's cover photograph of a young boy clutching a rabbit and posing like a superhero was shot by Nick Waplington. It received notoriety when Fountains of Wayne also used it for their debut album, leading to both albums featuring the same cover image upon their US releases in 1996.

In February 1995, Flamingoes signed a publishing deal with Bug Music. Their catalogue is now managed by BMG UK. Later that year, Flamingoes recorded the song "Water on the Brain" for the Hollies tribute album Sing Hollies in Reverse, and continued to tour Britain with second guitarist Adrian Stevenson. In December 1995, drummer Kevin Matthews left the band, to be replaced by Steve Necchi. Further to its US release on the Big Pop label, Plastic Jewels was also distributed in Japan, Australia and New Zealand.

In the following years, the brothers continued to write and record music. In 2007, they signed a distribution deal with Cadiz Music and played their first live shows for over ten years. Their second album Street Noise Invades the House, on Distort Boy Records, was produced by Jude and James Cook. The band has been inactive since 2008, after which Jude and James both forged careers in writing, journalism and publishing. The band's contribution to the Britpop era is documented in Paul Laird's history of the scene, The Birth and Impact of Britpop: Mis-shapes, Scenesters and Insatiable Ones (2022), as well as articles in Drowned in Sound, Repeat Records, and a 25th anniversary retrospective of Plastic Jewels on the Mild Mannered Army podcast in 2025. The history of the band is also documented in James Cook's book Memory Songs: A Personal Journey into the Music that Shaped the '90s (2018).

== Discography ==
=== Albums ===
- Plastic Jewels (1995; Pandemonium, UK / Big Pop, US / Mushroom/Festival, Australia / Tokuma, Japan)
- Street Noise Invades the House (2007; Distort Boy/Cadiz)

=== Singles ===
- "The Chosen Few" (1994; La La Land)
- "Teenage Emergency" (1994; Pandemonium)
- "Disappointed" (1994; Pandemonium)
- "Scenester" (1995; Pandemonium)

=== Compilation appearances ===
- "Water on the Brain" on Sing Hollies in Reverse (1995; Eggbert Records)
