= Ace A's and Killer B's =

Compilation album by Dodgy
- Released: 1998
- Recorded: 1992–1998
- Genre: Rock
- Length: 74:13
- Label: A & M

Ace A's and Killer B's is a compilation album (comprising several singles as well as B-sides) by the English band Dodgy, released in 1998.

== Track listing ==
All songs written by Dodgy unless noted.

1. "Every Single Day" – 4:01 (non-album single) (Nigel Clark)
2. "Staying Out for the Summer (Summer 95)" – 3:07 (from Homegrown)
3. "Water Under the Bridge" – 3:44 (from The Dodgy Album)
4. "Good Enough" – 4:01 (from Free Peace Sweet)
5. "Melodies Haunt You" – 3:41 (from Homegrown)
6. "Big Brown Moon" – 3:25 (b-side of Lovebirds)
7. "Found You" – 4:55 (from Free Peace Sweet)
8. "Self Doubt" – 3:51 (b-side of "In a Room")
9. "In a Room" – 4:17 (from Free Peace Sweet)
10. "Making the Most Of" – 4:05 (from Homegrown)
11. "If You're Thinking of Me" – 5:27 (from Free Peace Sweet)
12. "Lovebirds" – 3:56 (from The Dodgy Album)
13. "(Get Off Your) High Horse" – 4:40 (b-side of Staying Out for the Summer)
14. "So Let Me Go Far" – 4:07 (from Homegrown)
15. "Grassman" – 6:19 (from Homegrown)
16. "Ain't No Longer Asking" – 5:11 (from Free Peace Sweet)
17. "The Elephant" – 5:26 (b-side of The Black and White Single)
