= List of Britpop musicians =

The following is a list of Britpop musicians. While definitions may vary, artists labelled as Britpop were typically guitar-based bands that emerged from the British music scene, were most popular in the mid-1990s, and focused more on melody than other contemporary genres such as grunge.

== England ==
- The Auteurs
- Babybird
- Black Grape
- The Bluetones
- Blur
- The Boo Radleys
- Cast
- The Charlatans (middle period)
- Cornershop
- Denim
- Dodgy
- Echobelly
- Elastica
- Electronic (middle period)
- Embrace (early)
- Gay Dad
- Gene
- Heavy Stereo
- James
- Kenickie
- Kinky Machine
- Kula Shaker
- The Lightning Seeds
- Longpigs
- Lush (later period)
- Mansun
- Marion
- McAlmont & Butler
- Me Me Me
- Menswear
- My Life Story
- Northern Uproar
- Oasis
- Ocean Colour Scene
- Paul Weller
- Perfume
- Powder
- Pulp
- Radiohead (early)
- Reef
- Rialto
- Ride (middle period)
- Saint Etienne
- Salad
- The Seahorses
- Shed Seven
- Silver Sun
- Shampoo
- Sleeper
- S*M*A*S*H
- Space
- Spacehog
- Strangelove
- Suede
- Supergrass
- Theaudience
- These Animal Men
- The Verve
- Warm Jets

== Scotland ==
- Geneva
- The Supernaturals
- Teenage Fanclub (Grand Prix era)
- Travis (early)

== Wales ==
- 60 Ft. Dolls
- Catatonia
- Gorky's Zygotic Mynci
- Manic Street Preachers (middle period)
- Stereophonics (early)
- Super Furry Animals (early)

== Northern Ireland ==
- Ash (early)
- The Divine Comedy
