= Good Enough (Dodgy song) =

1996 single by Dodgy

Single by Dodgy

from the album Free Peace Sweet
- B-side: "Speaking in Tongues"; "Lovebirds on Katovit"; "Nutters"
- Released: 29 July 1996
- Studio: Wessex (London, England)
- Genre: Britpop
- Length: 4:01
- Label: A&M
- Songwriters: Nigel Clark; Mathew Priest; Andy Miller
- Producer: Hugh Jones

Dodgy singles chronology
| "In a Room" (1996) | "Good Enough" (1996) | "If You're Thinking of Me" (1996) |

"Good Enough" is a single released by English Britpop band Dodgy. The single was released on 29 July 1996 and became the band's highest-charting single in the United Kingdom, reaching number four on the UK Singles Chart and topping the UK airplay chart. In 1997, the song charted in Canada, peaking at number 20 on the RPM 100 Hit Tracks chart.

== Track listings ==
UK CD single

1. "Good Enough"
2. "Speaking in Tongues"
3. "Lovebirds on Katovit"

UK cassette and limited-edition 7-inch single

A. "Good Enough"
B. "Nutters"

Japanese CD single

1. "Good Enough"
2. "Speaking in Tongues"
3. "Lovebirds on Katovit"
4. "(Your Love Keeps Lifting Me) Higher and Higher"
5. "The Snake"
6. "I Can't Make It"

== Credits and personnel ==
Credits are taken from the Free Peace Sweet album booklet.

Studios

- Recorded at Wessex Studios (London, England)
- Additional recording and mixing at Battery and Orinoco Studios (London, England)
- Digitally edited and mastered at Metropolis Studios (London, England)

Personnel

- Nigel Clark – writing, vocals, acoustic and electric guitars, bass
- Mathew Priest – writing, vocals, drums, percussion
- Andy Miller – writing, vocals, lead guitar
- Richard Payne – keyboards
- The Kick Horns – horns
- Hugh Jones – production, mixing
- Robin Evans – engineering
- Helen Woodward – mix engineering
- Crispin Murray – digital editing
- Ian Cooper – mastering

== Charts ==
=== Weekly charts ===
| Chart (1996–1997) | Peak position |
|---|---|
| Belgium (Ultratip Bubbling Under Flanders) | 17 |
| Canada Top Singles (RPM) | 20 |
| Canada Adult Contemporary (RPM) | 51 |
| Estonia (Eesti Top 20) | 4 |
| Europe (Eurochart Hot 100) | 20 |
| Europe (European AC Radio) | 13 |
| Europe (European Alternative Rock Radio) | 2 |
| Europe (European Hit Radio) | 8 |
| Germany (GfK) | 80 |
| Iceland (Íslenski Listinn Topp 40) | 16 |
| Ireland (IRMA) | 24 |
| Israel (IBA) | 23 |
| Latvia (Latvijas Top 20) | 15 |
| Netherlands (Dutch Top 40 Tipparade) | 17 |
| Netherlands (Single Top 100) | 43 |
| Poland Airplay (Music & Media) | 13 |
| Scottish Singles Sales (Official Charts) | 6 |
| Spain Airplay (Top 40 Radio) | 25 |
| UK Singles (Official Charts) | 4 |
| UK Airplay (Music Week) | 1 |

=== Year-end charts ===
| Chart (1996) | Position |
|---|---|
| Europe (European Hit Radio) | 40 |
| UK Singles (OCC) | 72 |
| UK Airplay (Music Week) | 7 |

== Certifications ==
| Region | Certification | Certified units/sales |
|---|---|---|
| United Kingdom (BPI) Sales since 2011 | Gold | 400,000^{‡} |
^{‡} Sales+streaming figures based on certification alone.

== Release history ==
| Region | Date | Format(s) | Label(s) | Ref. |
|---|---|---|---|---|
| United Kingdom | 29 July 1996 | 7-inch vinyl; CD; cassette | A&M | |
| Japan | 26 September 1996 | CD | A&M | |
