= Stand Upright in a Cool Place =

Studio album by Dodgy
- Released: 20 February 2012
- Genre: Britpop
- Length: 49:51
- Label: Strike Back
- Producer: Dodgy and Robin Evans

Dodgy chronology
Real Estate (2001)	Stand Upright in a Cool Place (2012)	What Are We Fighting For (2016)

Stand Upright in a Cool Place is the fifth studio album by the British band Dodgy. Released on 19 February 2012, it also marks the reunion of the band's original line-up following the return of lead singer Nigel Clark who had left during the band's commercial peak in 1998.

== Background ==
Following Nigel Clark's departure in 1998 to work on solo projects, Mathew Priest and Andy Miller continued as Dodgy with new singer Dave Bassey, keyboardist Chris Hallam and bassist Nick Abnett, releasing the fan-funded album Real Estate in 2001 before going inactive. Meanwhile, Clark moved from London to the Midlands; recorded a self-financed solo album, Make Believe Love, which ended up unreleased; moved to Ireland where he worked at factories, then relocated to Worcestershire where he opened a recording studio and worked with troubled children; and finally released his solo debut album 21st Century Man in 2006.

On 25 November 2006, a benefit concert was held for Andy Moore, Dodgy's former lighting technician who had been diagnosed with an incurable brain tumor. Clark was one of the performers on the bill, and during his set he was joined by Priest, the first time the two had performed together in almost a decade. This was the catalyst for the original Dodgy line-up of Clark, Priest and Miller to reunite, especially since Moore had always urged them to get back together. Moore ultimately died on the day of the reunited band's first rehearsal. The band's reunion tour was scheduled to kick off in Glasgow on 5 November 2007, but the day before the first show Miller fell out of bed and chipped a bone in his left forearm, forcing the tour to be cancelled. The reunion tour finally commenced in March 2008, with the band dedicating it to the memory of Andy Moore.

== Recording ==
The album was recorded during the summer of 2011 at Clark's studio in Worcestershire, an old farmhouse with a view of the Malvern Hills where the band had been working on new material since 2007. The album was mixed by Matt Pence, who was recommended by Simon Raymonde and had gained Dodgy's appreciation for his most recent work with John Grant and Midlake.

== Track listing ==
All songs written by Nigel Clark, Andy Miller and Mathew Priest unless otherwise stated.

No.	Title	Writer(s)	Length
1.	"Tripped and Fell"		4:49
2.	"What Became of You"		4:49
3.	"We Try"		4:43
4.	"Shadows"	Clark; Colin Foreman; Miller; Priest	4:13
5.	"Did It Have to Be This Way"	Clark; Foreman; Miller; Priest	4:36
6.	"Waiting for the Sun"		4:15
7.	"Raggedstone Hill"		6:41
8.	"Only a Heartbeat"		4:18
9.	"Find a Place"		2:39
10.	"Back of You"		3:21
11.	"Happy Ending"		4:57

Bonus CD: More Songs (Deluxe Edition Double CD Boxset)
No.	Title	Length
1.	"We're Gonna Be Together"	3:23
2.	"Down In the Flood"	3:57
3.	"Everywhere That You Go"	3:29
4.	"Forgive Me"	4:29
5.	"You Can Hold My Hand"	3:16
6.	"If You've Got a Problem with Willie Nelson (You've Got a Problem with Me)"	2:04
7.	"Let's Wait Till We Get There"	4:42
8.	"Stand Upright In a Cool Place"	5:04
9.	"Waiting for the Sun" (demo version)	2:39

== Personnel ==
- Nigel Clark - vocals, acoustic guitars, bass, piano, keyboards, electric guitar, cabasa, whale sounds
- Andy Miller - electric guitars, vocals, acoustic guitar, lap steel guitar, contrabass harmonica, mandolin, violin bow, cocktails and biscuits
- Mathew Priest - drums, vocals, all percussion (except for some minor cabasa), glockenspiel, actuality, fly swat

Additional musicians

- Luke Wrumli - harmonica (track 4)
- Vicki Rose Evans - voice (track 11)
- Collette Treadgold - backing singing (track 9)
- Zeb Jameson - keyboards and samples (bonus CD track 3)

Production

- Dodgy - producer
- Robin Evans - producer
- Nigel Clark - producer (bonus CD)
- Matt Pence - mixing
- John Dent - mastering
- Jas Mitchell - mastering (bonus CD)
