= Craig Warnock =

English actor

- Born: 22 February 1970 (age 56); Hammersmith, London, England
- Occupations: Actor; musician

Craig Warnock (born 22 February 1970) is an English actor.

Warnock's best known role is that of Kevin in Terry Gilliam's Time Bandits (1981).

Warnock has acted in To the Lighthouse (1983), an adaptation of the novel by Virginia Woolf, and provided the voice of Dez's dad Clooney from Wishfart.

As a musician, Warnock has played keyboards with These Animal Men and Mo Solid Gold.

== Filmography ==
Year	Title	Role
1981	Time Bandits	Kevin
1983	To the Lighthouse	Jasper Ramsey (aged 14)
