= The Dodgy Album =

Studio album by Dodgy
- Released: 24 May 1993
- Genre: Britpop
- Length: 44:03
- Label: A&M
- Producer: Ian Broudie

Dodgy chronology
| The Dodgy Album (1993) | Homegrown (1994) |

Professional ratings
Review scores
| Source | Rating |
|---|---|
| AllMusic | 4/5 stars |
| Select | 4/5 stars |

The Dodgy Album is the debut album by the British indie group Dodgy.

Water Under the Bridge, the first single released from this album, saw the beginning of "the way of dodgy", a step-by-step enlightened 'dodgy' philosophy that would appear on the record sleeves for each of their future recordings. The artwork also included their 'mdv' logo. The single was released in early 1993, and the video for the song featured the band in Amsterdam.

The second single was Lovebirds, a song that had won them an award on Gary Crowley's GLR show during the band's youth. Included on the single was the acoustic live favourite Big Brown Moon.

Continuing their new shiny artwork on singles, Dodgy released I Need Another, the cover of which depicted the band as garden gnomes and included a campfire version of Never Again, complete with the sound of crackling logs.

Drummer Mathew Priest has described the album retrospectively as an "awkward cousin" to the two that followed it, Homegrown and Free Peace Sweet, because the band "hadn’t quite found our vibe in the studio yet" and so allowed producer Ian Broudie to control the sound. Writing on Facebook, Priest said: "[Broudie] is amazing and produced a great record but certain bits sound like a Lightning Seeds record".

== Track listing ==
All music composed by Andy Miller and Nigel Clark; all lyrics written by Andy Miller, Nigel Clark and Mathew Priest.

1. "Water Under the Bridge" – 3:43
2. "I Need Another" – 3:48
3. "Lovebirds" – 3:56
4. "Satisfied" – 6:06
5. "Grand Old English Oak Tree" – 4:43
6. "Stand by Yourself" – 3:47
7. "As My Time Goes By" – 4:41
8. "Never Again" – 4:09
9. "Cold Tea" – 4:58
10. "We're Not Going to Take This Anymore" – 4:05

== Personnel ==
- Andy Miller - guitars, backing vocals
- Nigel Clark - bass, lead vocals
- Mathew Priest - drums, backing vocals, percussion
- Simon Rogers - Hammond organ
