= Skyscraper (band) =

British band

- Origin: United Kingdom
- Years active: 1992–1998
- Labels: Incoherent/Food Records; Scared Hitless; Dynosupreme Records
- Past members: Vic Kemlicz (guitar, vocals); Adam Lamprell (guitar); Adi Vines (bass guitar); Craig Coggle(drums); Bernhard Hoetzl (drums); Oliver Grassett (drums)

Skyscraper were a British-based rock band active between 1992 and 1998. They released three singles on Food Records (the first two through label subsidiary Incoherent Records) and two albums and one single on their own Dynosupreme Records, also touring the UK extensively and appearing on MTV and British national radio. The band were favourites of the UK rock press, with Metal Hammer magazine calling Skyscraper's 1995 album Superstate "... the best debut by far of any British rock band in recent years".

== Formation and first line up ==
Skyscraper were formed in autumn 1992 by guitarist/vocalist Vic Kemlicz, formerly of the London band Milk and ex-Swervedriver bass guitarist Adi Vines. The line up was completed by drummer Oliver Grasset. Although the band's music was superficially similar to the grunge style that was popular at the time, it contained a melodic inventiveness and a characteristically unusual guitar style, which brought the band swift attention. After making their live debut at London venue The Falcon in October 1992, the band soon raised their profile further by signing to Food Records, appearing as support to Rage Against the Machine and recording a session for John Peel's radio show in February 1993.

== Early EPs and UK tours ==
In early 1993, the band entered Monnow Valley studios, to start the first of two recording sessions with producer Roli Mosimann. One of the tracks from this session became the lead track of the band's first EP Choke which was released on Incoherent Records (a subsidiary of Food Records, which was co-owned by EMI Records) in July 1993. The electronic underlay applied to the production lead to UK music magazine Melody Maker to describe it as "Industrial Grunge: like Ministry performed by humans. It's awesome", while the NME referred to it as a "... super solid riff edifice". The EP was an independent chart hit and Skyscraper toured the UK extensively in support of the release, both as headliners in their own right as well as playing opening slots for Helmet (band), The God Machine (band), Mega City Four, Medicine (band) and others, as well as also appearing at the 1993 Phoenix Festival.

The second single "Lovesick" was released in November 1993. RAW magazine boldly proclaimed that "if Rage Against The Machine liked metal one little bit, they'd be as good as Lovesick is", and the band embarked on a three-week co-headlining tour with labelmates Mint 400 which was sponsored by BBC Radio One. Skyscraper ended the year as special guests to Therapy? and Cop Shoot Cop on a short run of UK dates in early December.

In 1994, EMI Records gained a controlling stake in Food Records, although label boss (and Skyscraper A&R representative) Andy Ross was running the label. Although Skyscraper's debut album for the label was technically complete, the band recorded two new tracks early in the year and although a third EP was scheduled for release in early 1994, this was pushed back to April to coincide with a series of live dates Skyscraper had secured as special guests to Killing Joke. Despite the success of these appearances (with the band's line up augmented by the temporary addition of a second guitarist, Andrew ‘Fuzz’ DuPrey of Silverfish (band)) which were well received by the UK rock press, with one magazine stating in an enthusiastic review that "Skyscraper look like they are about to inherit the world", the Man Made Hell EP was not released by Food/EMI until the end of May. Despite being awarded 'Single Of The Week' status by Kerrang!, and the promo video receiving plays on UK TV, at the end of June 1994, Skyscraper were dropped by the Food/EMI label and the band's contract was terminated.

== Independent releases and line up changes ==
It would not be until April 1995 that Skyscraper released any new material when the Never Again EP was issued through a one-off deal with independent label Scared Hitless. Once more, this was made 'Single Of The Week' by Kerrang!, courtesy of guest reviewers Gregor Mackintosh and Nick Holmes of Paradise Lost (band) and was also an independent hit. However, Oliver Grasset subsequently left the band and was replaced by Berhard Hoetzl and after Skyscraper were unable to find a satisfactory new long-term recording contract, in autumn 1995 (encouraged by and in partnership with their friend Robin Proper Sheppard, singer/guitarist with The God Machine (band) and Sophia (British band) and also owner of The Flower Shop record label) they formed their own imprint, Dynosupreme Records, with the intention of both managing themselves and releasing their own products.

The band's debut album, Superstate, was released on Dynosupreme Records in November 1995 to great acclaim by the UK rock press, with both Metal Hammer and Kerrang magazines awarding the album five stars while the more indie-centric magazine Select called it “top notch British rock at it's [sic] white hot blistering best”. A UK tour to support the release started in Liverpool on 30 November 1995 with ex-Scissormen guitarist Adam Lamprell replacing Andrew ‘Fuzz’ DuPrey in the position of live guitarist, but who would become a permanent member of the band shortly afterwards. The album was also released in Australia/New Zealand by Shock Records, in Europe via Concrete/Edel and in the US by Edel America, although the European and US versions feature different cover art to the UK version.

In early 1996, the readers of Kerrang! voted Skyscraper one of the 10 ‘Best New Bands’ and in March, Dynosupreme Records released the album track ‘Petrified’ as a single. This was once again awarded ‘Single Of The Week’ and the band performed the song (plus another album cut ‘Sorry For What I Am’) live on MTV's ‘Headbangers Ball’ and also cut a four-song session for BBC Radio 1's ‘Friday Rock Show’. A UK headlining tour followed, which prompted one reviewer to conclude that “Skyscraper are built for the stadiums, not the toilets, of this world” and in May 1996, the band joined Send No Flowers and Feeder (band) on a short run of UK dates. A further headlining tour in Summer 1996 was postponed following injuries sustained by Vic Kemlicz and Skyscraper finally made the last appearance of the 'Superstate' campaign as special guests to Prong (band) at The Garage, London on 28 August 1996.

== Second album and break up ==
Skyscraper released their second album, Shooters, on Dynosupreme Records in April 1998. Bernhard Hoetzl had been replaced by former Sun Dial drummer Craig Adrienne (real name Craig Coggle) and this was a low key release, with the band doing no press or promotion to coincide with the album launch. Nevertheless, both Metal Hammer and Kerrang! magazine gave the album enthusiastic reviews. At the time, no reason was given for both the long delay between albums or the nature of the release. However, during 2011, on the official Swervedriver forum, bassist Adi Vines posted an opinion piece on the album, stating that "much credit also has to go to drummer Craig Coggle, as it was his arrival during the writing sessions, that were not progressing well prior to this point, that kick started the whole process back into life". He also refers to "uncomfortable memories it raised", which would seem to suggest that all was not well within the band at that time, as Skyscraper only made one live appearance in support of the album (at The Garage, London on April 2, 1998) before splitting up. No official announcement was made, but the band have never played live or released any new material since.

== 2022 reissues & death of Vic Kemlicz ==
On 22 February 2022, the Skyscraper Facebook page announced that both their albums had been remastered and were available for download. This is the first time that the band's material has been given an official digital release. Both albums come in extended editions that feature B-sides and rarities and are available through the Bandcamp website.

On 17th October 2022, the Skyscraper Facebook page announced that Vic Kemlicz had passed away the previous month, after a battle with cancer.

== Discography ==
=== EPs ===
- Choke (Food/Incoherent 1993)
- Lovesick (Food/Incoherent 1993)
- Man Made Hell (Food 1994)
- Never Again (Scared Hitless 1995)
- Petrified (Dynosupreme 1996)

=== Albums ===
- Superstate (Dynosupreme 1995)
- Shooters (Dynosupreme 1997)
