= Wishfart =

- Genre: Fantasy comedy Surreal humour Urban fantasy
- Created by: John Hazlett; Lienne Sawatsky; Daniel Williams
- Directed by: Jason Groh
- Voices of: Deven Mack; Sergio Di Zio; Stephany Seki
- Theme music composer: Martin Kucaj
- Composer: Scott Bucsis
- Country of origin: Canada
- Original language: English
- No. of seasons: 1
- No. of episodes: 40

Production
- Executive producers: John Hazlett; Lienne Sawatzky; Daniel Williams; Tatiana Kober; Scott Dyer; Helen Lebeau
- Producers: Dan Williams; Laurie Handforth
- Running time: 22 minutes
- Production companies: Wishfart Productions Inc.; Slap Happy Cartoons; Nelvana; Corus Entertainment

Original release
- Network: Teletoon
- Release: 9 June – 9 November 2018

Wishfart is a Canadian urban fantasy comedy animated television series created by John Hazlett, Lienne Sawatsky and Daniel Williams. The series was produced by Wishfart Productions Inc. in association with Nelvana and Corus Entertainment, with Bejuba! Entertainment holding worldwide distribution rights. The series first made its British debut in the United Kingdom on CITV on 5 September 2017, and later made its official premiere in its home country of Canada on Teletoon on 9 June 2018. The series follows Dez, a teenage leprechaun with wish-granting powers, as he goes on escapades with a puffin named Puffin and a centuries-old teenage ghost girl named Akiko.

== Characters ==
=== Main ===
- Dez (voiced by Deven Mack): An awkward and reserved teenage leprechaun. He has the ability to grant wishes by firing a rainbow from his finger. However, wishes he grants always go wrong in some fashion, forcing him and his friends to fix them.
- Puffin (voiced by Sergio Di Zio): A talking puffin who shares Dez's apartment. Although he is greedy, lazy, and self-centered, he is a very supportive friend towards Dez, who granted him the ability to speak with one of his wishes.
- Akiko (voiced by Stephany Seki): A mischievous and sarcastic yūrei who haunts Dez's apartment. She is an eternal teenager who died centuries ago from a plague that wiped out her whole village. She is nicknamed "Keeks" by her friends.

=== Recurring ===
- Tsuni (voiced by Jordan Todosey): A laid-back mermaid who rides on a skateboard and Dez's love interest. She has darker skin than Dez and has a collapsible trident in her backpack. She works at a magical comic book store, where Dez and his friends hang out.
- Fireball Cat (voiced by Martin Roach): A mystical anthropomorphic cat named for the fire that burns on his head. He is the owner of a noodle soup restaurant frequented by Dez, his friends, and many other characters. He possesses near-omnipotent magical powers and knowledge, notably the ability to use his own mouth for scrying.
- The King of the Underworld (voiced by Brian Drummond): A giant angry demon who rules the Underworld. He is the occasional nemesis of Dez and his friends.
- Phil (voiced by Blair Williams): Dez's bitter, cynical, and greedy leprechaun uncle.
- Neptune (voiced by Christian Potenza): The God of the Sea, who behaves like an egotistical "surfer dude".
- Howie (voiced by Doug Hadders): A centaur who works in the postal service.
- Samuel (voiced by Doug Hadders): A yeti smothered in ice cream. He wished for endless ice cream from Dez long ago, but soon came to regret the wish due to having to live with brain freeze, sticky fingers, and lactose intolerance.
- Clooney (voiced by Craig Warnock): Dez's leprechaun dad.
- Emer (voiced by Kathleen Laskey): Dez's leprechaun mom.
- Finnuala (voiced by Samantha Weinstein): Dez's nemesis. She is a leprechaun enforcer, working at her father's leprechaun reprogramming facility to ensure that all leprechauns are behaving as stereotypically expected of their kind.
- Leslie Walderamma (voiced by Darren Frost): An obnoxious wizard boy.
- Dusty (voiced by Evany Rosen): A witch who takes offense at people making assumptions about her.
- Gum King (voiced by Juan Chioran): A humanoid creature composed entirely out of gum who was created after one of Dez's wishes backfired. He is Akiko's nemesis and the self-proclaimed ruler of all gum. When not antagonizing Akiko, he is an employee of De-Gum Chums, a business that specializes in removing gum.
- G (voiced by Jeff Lumby): A gargoyle who works as the security guard for Dez's apartment.
- Janice (voiced by Julie Lemieux): The two-faced Goddess of Thresholds. She is the doorperson of Dez's apartment.

== Production ==
The series' title is a pun on the phrase "brain fart", applying the term instead to wishes. The series' creators came up with Wishfart during a lunchtime conversation when Dan Williams pitched an idea for a live-action series about a rich man in green who used his wealth to make people's wishes come true. The idea was soon developed into a children's animated series about a non-traditional leprechaun. The creators had little experience with animation, but managed to successfully pitch their idea directly to Teletoon without any sample artwork, thanks to the support of international distributor and producing partner, Tatiana Kober.

The first season was produced for $7.4 million US. Slap Happy Cartoons did the character designs, with the creators' aim being rounded shapes and thin outlines.

== Episodes ==
No.	Title	Written by	Storyboard by	Original release date
1	"Cartwheel! Cartwheel! Cartwheel!"	John Hazlett, Lienne Sawatsky & Dan Williams	Jason Armstrong & Frank Ramirez	5 September 2017 (CITV)
Akiko turns into a "real living girl" and accidentally upsets the balance with the underworld. And since she's busy loving living so much, its up to Dez and Puffin to figure out how to deal with the angry King of the Underworld. But that doesn't go so well. As they flee the fuming King, they manage a quick consult with Fireball Cat. He drops the hint that there is another solution. One of them can take her place in the underworld, but neither feel like giving up on life... just yet.
2	"Chopstick Jab"	John Hazlett, Lienne Sawatsky & Dan Williams	Jason Armstrong & Frank Ramirez	5 September 2017 (CITV)
By just moving the couch, the trio unleash a Leprechaun greed demon into the world. Overcome with greedy thoughts themselves, they part company, but Fireball Cat gives Dez a special tool to wake himself out of the greed haze. Armed with "chopsticks of awareness", Dez shakes off the greed that has turned him into a jerk. He gets the gang back together and they take on the greed demon that still possesses the family couch. But something is holding them back. Leftover greed perhaps?
3	"What's Up, P. Buddy?"	John Hazlett, Lienne Sawatsky & Dan Williams	Tim O'Halloran & Christopher Richards	12 September 2017 (CITV)
Puffin acts really weird after he wishes his video game hero, Major Abs, came to life. Dez and Akiko follow Puffin to a warehouse on the outskirts of town. There they discover Major Abs and his makeshift brainwashed army! They burst in, but it's an ambush! Major Abs's plan is to weaponize Dez's wish powers and take over the world. Dez and Akiko have to figure out how to unbrainwash Puffin and send Major Abs back into the game he came from.
4	"Litterfools Ain't Cool"	John Hazlett, Lienne Sawatsky & Dan Williams	Tim O'Halloran & Christopher Richards	12 September 2017 (CITV)
Dez, Puffin, and Akiko travel deep into Dez's unconscious mind when he starts dream-wishing. At first, Dez's mind seems like a happy-go-lucky place, but as they travel deeper into his subconscious, everything takes a sinister turn. Finally, at the deepest level, they find the cause of Dez's unsettled mind: Litterbug Dez. Turns out Dez can't stand littering. An evenly matched Dez vs. Dez battle ensues. And unless Dez vanquishes Litterbug Dez, they'll be trapped in the dreamworld forever.
5	"Aw, Man!"	Stephanie Kaliner	Jason Armstrong & Frank Ramirez	19 September 2017 (CITV)
An ice-cream monster named Samuel reveals the extent of Dez's disastrous wish-granting. Then Dez discovers a Victims of Dez support group, made up of people he's granted wonky wishes to. He sneaks in, but Puffin slips up and Dez is unmasked! They chase him through the streets and Dez vows never to grant wishes again. But when Akiko, mid-battle with the squishy Gum King, points out that everyone is in charge of their own destinies, Dez vows to help all his "victims" turn their lives around.
6	"Let's Ditch Dorkus"	Doug Hadders & Adam Rotstein	Jason Armstrong & Frank Ramirez	19 September 2017 (CITV)
Puffin accidentally summons the King of the Underworld to play a confusing card game. It turns out the King of the Underworld loves playing games, but even more, he loves hanging out! Before long they're a leather-jacket-wearing gang. But when "Kingie" steals some movie tickets from Tsuni, Dez realizes they're not a very nice gang. Unfortunately, you can't just leave a gang run by the King of the Underworld. Dez challenges him to a duel. A confusing card game duel. But who is the better player?
7	"Does This Please the Jigmaster?"	Emer Connon	Tim O'Halloran & Christopher Richards	26 September 2017 (CITV)
When Dez complains about leprechaun stereotypes, he gets dragged to a reprogramming facility. Akiko and Puffin follow Dez and sneak in, disguised as leprechauns. Unfortunately, they get brainwashed into believing they are actual leprechauns. While Dez tries to escape, Finnuala the reprogrammer forces him to act like a proper leprechaun! Finally, Dez is put on trial. They're going to remove his wish-granting abilities. He calls their bluff, but what will happen if they literally cut off his powers?
8	"Baby... Seal... Thingy"	Josh Sager & Jerome Simpson	Tim O'Halloran & Christopher Richards	26 September 2017 (CITV)
A baby selkie thinks Akiko's his mama, so she wishes it was big enough to take care of itself. Unfortunately, it turns in to a helpless baby in a full-grown seal's body. The gang needs to find it a new mama, but somehow the baby gets elected as mayor. His first mayoral duty is a dinner with the vicious Turtle Monster! Worried he'll be eaten alive, Dez, Puffin, and Akiko pose as professional waiters to ensure the dinner goes smoothly. Unfortunately, Baby Mayor hasn't learned his table manners yet.
9	"Spicy is Paradisey"	Stephen Kaliner	Jason Armstrong & Frank Ramirez	10 October 2017 (CITV)
When Puffin wishes he could eat forever, he eats for 5,000 years and turns into a mountain. While Akiko believes friends should support friends' wants, Dez's descendant Wise Dez thinks they should stop feeding overstuffed Puffin for his own good. Nobody agrees, so a loyal group of Puffinites sacrifice Dez. Inside Puffin's tummy, Wise Dez realizes Puffin hasn't digested anything he's eaten. He has to convince everybody that sometimes friends should give friends what they need, not what they want.
10	"Goodbye Short Pants"	Doug Hadders & Adam Rotstein	Jason Armstrong & Frank Ramirez	10 October 2017 (CITV)
When Dez, Puffin, and Akiko need a lift to a concert, they wish Dez was old enough to drive. It works! Dez gets a driver's license and everything! But as they head across town, Puffin and Akiko get hints that Dez is actually growing older and older. They ignore the signs, so unfortunately, the closer they get, the older Dez gets, and the more of a cautious driver he becomes. They pretty much miss the concert, but worse, by the time they get there, Old Dez is so old he's nearly dead!
11	"Normal Sad"	Emer Connon	Tim O'Halloran & Christopher Richards	17 October 2017 (CITV)
Puffin's wish to skip the rain and go straight to rainbows creates a rainbow happy storm. At first Dez thinks this is great, but soon sees that being too happy is making everyone take ridiculously dangerous risks. But Dez's attempt to battle too much happiness by digging deep and countering it with his own sadness fails – he just doesn't have it in him. If our trio hope to save the day, they need a serious jolt of sadness, and so they turn to grumpy Uncle Phil to supply the ultimate bummer vibe.
12	"We're a Ragtag Team"	Josh Sager & Jerome Simpson	Tim O'Halloran & Christopher Richards	17 October 2017 (CITV)
A wish to be master thieves lands the trio in a storage locker with a stack of stolen gold. But the gold turns out to be Dez's parent's gold, and now they have to get it back into the apartment before they're caught. Using an assortment of tools clearly used in the heist they have to figure out how they stole the gold in the first place. Which becomes more difficult because they have gold sniffing Uncle Phil on their trail. Plus Dez's father is on his way into the apartment to check the gold!
13	"Why Don't We All Have Capes?"	Doug Hadders & Adam Rotstein	Jason Armstrong, Cory Wilson, Frank Ramirez	24 October 2017 (CITV)
When Akiko wishes Tsuni would sing at karaoke night, her song summons the deadly Kraken. Not to worry, mild mannered Tsuni turns into a super heroine on just these occasions. But Dez won't stop trying to help even if he is constantly getting in the way. This is one situation where Dez should forget the heroics and stand aside in order to save the day, but he's one determined dummy. As Tsuni takes on the beast in epic battle, Dez figures it out, but not in time to avoid one epic final mistake.
14	"Le Sigh"	Stephanie Kaliner	Jason Armstrong, Cory Wilson, Frank Ramirez	24 October 2017 (CITV)
A hasty wish turns the cafe into a robo-automat, and Fireball Cat's soup loses its magic. Even Fireball Cat has lost his memory, so the trio try to recreate his magic soup recipe in hopes of restoring both Fireball and the shop. As the citizens bemoan the loss of the soup that made them all feel better when they were down, the trio gather the complex list of ingredients for the magic soup. Trouble is, you can lead a cat to soup but you can't make him drink. Or maybe even remember?
15	"It's Cake Time, Bro"	Stephanie Kaliner	Tim O'Halloran, Christopher Richards	31 October 2017 (CITV)
In order to go to a party at Neptune's underwater pad, Dez accidental becomes a merman. But he's so into getting to the party, because Tsuni is going, that he puts off dealing with the problem until later. It turns out there's more to being a merman than breathing water and figuring out how to use the special bathroom, because Dez finds out he's now one of Neptune's subjects. He keeps up a brave face in front of Tsuni, as Neptune orders him around, but it's finally all too much for him.
16	"I Wear This Hat Ironically"	Josh Sager & Jerome Simpson	Tim O'Halloran, Christopher Richards	14 November 2017 (CITV)
Puffin and Akiko inadvertently steal Dez's special 'thing' by becoming master jar openers. But when Dez goes on a search for a new 'thing', he fails. Driven by jealousy, he buys a cursed jar from Dusty the Witch that only a true jar opener can open. But when, as planned, Puffin and Akiko can't open the jar, Dez's moment of satisfaction is short lived, because the jar starts to destroy the world. Maybe some of those skills Dez learned in his search might come in handy right about now.
17	"Hot Spicy Breath"	Emer Connon	Jason Armstrong, Frank Ramirez	14 November 2017 (CITV)
The city is overtaken by terrifying and delicious hordes of gingerdead cookies. As the trio take shelter in the comic book shop they realize they must find the cause of the disaster and Tsuni may just have the answers. They implore Tsuni to open a first edition comic book which contains the cookie's origin story. Fireball appears and reveals that he created the gingerdeads. But now there is moaning, and it looks like Dez has been bitten. As he turns into a cookie, Puffin promises to eat him.
18	"Million Mo' Wishes"	Doug Hadders & Adam Rotstein	Jason Armstrong, Frank Ramirez	21 November 2017 (CITV)
Wizard boy Leslie takes advantage of Dez and wishes for 'a million wishes', which is jerky. But as Dez valiantly attempts to grant the million wishes, his nemesis Finnuala arrives and tries to arrest Leslie for wish crimes. Even though Leslie is super annoying Dez feels responsible and the trio escape together with Leslie. With Finnuala in hot pursuit the gang test the question, if you treat jerky Leslie with kindness will he clue in and get less jerky?
19	"Clip, Clop, We Won't Stop"	Emer Connon	Tim O'Halloran, Christopher Richards	21 November 2017 (CITV)
Dez's old shoes come to life and demand that he complete a ridiculous childhood bucket list. Dez tries refusing but the shoes wear him down, and even after he thinks he's completed the list there's one more truly terrifying thing left. Turns out that Dez has blocked that task from his mind. The one task that is truly terrifying, the one thing no kid ever wants to do… look under the bed. Getting his courage up, they check. And there's nothing there. But a careless wish changes all that.
20	"And They Ate the Goldfish"	Josh Sager & Jerome Simpson	Tim O'Halloran, Christopher Richards	31 October 2017 (CITV)
When Akiko's parents visit, she tries to impress them by acting like she's a scary ghost. Unfortunately, even with Dez and Puffin's help, her scary act bombs and her ghostly parents seem as un-impressed as ever. In an outburst of teenage frustration, Akiko wishes she was a 'truly terrifying' ghost. Now that Akiko is really haunting the apartment, Dez and Puffin have to figure out how to catch her, stage an intervention, and bring the ghost family together before the doorperson evicts her.
21	"Warmer Pants for the King"	Doug Hadders & Adam Rotstein	Jason Armstrong, Frank Ramirez	5 December 2017 (CITV)
After trying Tsuni's community garden stinklettuce, Puffin wishes vegetables didn't exist. But when the nutrient-deprived townspeople discover snowpeople still have their carrot noses, a sinister nose-hunt begins. Dez, instead of fessing up like he knows he should, ends up accepting the role of King of the Snowpeople, a perk-filled position which the gang gets so comfortable with they almost don't notice that they are actually the main targets of the snowpeople's revenge war.
22	"Strangely Perfect"	Stephanie Kaliner	Jason Armstrong, Frank Ramirez	5 December 2017 (CITV)
Finnuala, sick of Dez's non-traditional ways, tries to steal his rainbow. Instead, the two leprechauns end up swapping powers, which means Dez is suddenly in possession of a perfectly functioning rainbow. He seeks out altruistic wishes to grant, but Finnuala, wielding Dez's unruly rainbow, is cornered by the Gum King who goes on a disastrously gummy wish-making spree. The gang puts Gum King back in his place, but Dez is only happy once he has his own rainbow back. It may be wonky but it's his.
23	"Guess What Picasso?"	Josh Sager & Jerome Simpson	Tim O'Halloran, Christopher Richards	12 December 2017 (CITV)
Puffin invokes the wrath of an ice cream artisan minotaur by asking for mixed flavours. His refusal to apologize gets the gang trapped in the minotaur's maze where they must complete three impossible tasks or get stomp-eaten. It takes Puffin nearly losing his friends forever to finally apologize to the minotaur. But it takes Dez realizing how important his friend's individuality is before they can all take a stand against the bully minotaur.
24	"Gross But Noble"	Shawn Kalb	Tim O'Halloran, Christopher Richards	12 December 2017 (CITV)
A routine gum-removal service call thrusts Akiko into battle with old nemesis, the Gum King. What neither hotheaded Akiko nor rescue-mode Dez and Puffin realize is that the down and out King is just innocently doing his job. It is only after spending the day with him doing his rounds can Akiko begrudgingly admit her foe needs confidence-building more than vanquishing. She convinces the guys to help get the King's life back on track. But will she regret her good deed later?
25	"Team Shazamrock"	Emer Connon	Jason Armstrong, Frank Ramirez	19 December 2017 (CITV)
Finnuala invites Dez to be guest speaker at her young leprechauns club, the Little Shamrocks. But when our gang realizes she's actually invited him as a perfect example of how not to be a leprechaun, they leave in a huff and start their own club. Team Shazamrock, a club for modern freethinking wish-granters, is great fun at first. But when a torrent of candy-based wishes threatens to sink the park and everyone in it, Dez has to get serious about his unique leprechaun talent: chaos management.
26	"Christmas Times the Max"	Doug Hadders & Adam Rotstein	Jason Armstrong, Frank Ramirez	19 December 2017 (CITV)
When Samuel wishes it was Christmas in July Dez gets to meet his wish-hero, Santa Claus (Paul Soles in his final voice acting role before his death in 2021). But Santa, needing his rest and having none of this Christmas in July business, deputizes "Santa Dez" in his place. Dez is pumped about giving the people the best Christmas EVER, but his over the top efforts have the opposite effect and actually outrage the townspeople. Dez feels like a wish-granting failure until he realizes the true meaning of Christmas and comes up with a plan so good even Santa volunteers to help.
27	"In Your Face, Wishpower!"	Stephanie Kaliner	Tim O'Halloran, Christopher Richards	9 January 2018 (CITV)
Dez happily grants Tsuni's wish to go to a movie – until her date turns out to be Neptune! Desperate to derail the date, Dez, Puffin and Akiko set out to physically stall them both so they miss the movie. But wishpower is stronger than that, and it fights back by unraveling Dez's past wishes, even returning Puffin back to just a normal bird. To put things right Dez has to make Tsuni's wish come true, even if it means having to watch her go on that date with hunky Neptune.
28	"Knit Harder"	Shawn Kalb	Tim O'Halloran, Christopher Richards	9 January 2018 (CITV)
Dez joins a knitting circle to impress Tsuni and accidentally unravels the fabric of reality. Even worse, Tsuni is erased from existence and nobody but Dez even remembers who she is! As Puffin and Akiko help the knitting group, led by Fireball Cat, manically knit the world back together, Dez goes on a solo mission to save his mermaid crush. But will he find the missing loop and get Fireball to knit it back into his scarf of reality before it's too late?
29	"Classic Uncle Phil"	Emer Connon	Jason Armstrong, Frank Ramirez	16 January 2018 (CITV)
After learning miserly Uncle Phil has never granted a wish, the gang sets out to make him. But when their plan works better than expected, Phil's radical turnaround into gleeful wish-granter has a surprising effect on Dez. Jealous of his uncle's sudden popularity, Dez unconsciously starts to transform into a grumpy recluse. Is Dez destined to become an "Uncle Phil"? Or will he remember who he really is, a happy-go-lucky goof who chooses his own destiny?
30	"Agita Una Gamba!"	Doug Hadders & Adam Rotstein	Jason Armstrong, Frank Ramirez	16 January 2018 (CITV)
Akiko meets a dark mysterious stranger who warns her not to accept any secret party invites. Advice she ignores only to find herself trapped in the chip factory fighting a ghost-hunter. Dez and Puffin come to her rescue but have a ridiculously hard time getting in the building. Luckily, the gang gets together just in time to bring down the ghost hunter, uncover his real identity, and help Akiko make a stand for ghosts everywhere. Ghosts shouldn't have to haunt if they don't want to!
31	"Ciao, Bright Eyes"	Josh Sager & Jerome Simpson	Tim O'Halloran, Christopher Richards	22 January 2018 (CITV)
Puffin moves out of the apartment after he and Dez fight about whether he's a pet or not. Puffin busies himself trying to find a new pet owner to take care of his needs while Dez drags Akiko around freeing all the pets in what he sees is oppression. Puffin finds a new owner in Dusty, but she's got other plans for him. She's going to feed him to her dragon. Meanwhile Dez's plan to free the pets wreaks havoc in the city. Can the two old friends re-unite before it's too late?
32	"Customer Service Is My Jam"	Stephanie Kaliner	Tim O'Halloran, Christopher Richards	22 January 2018 (CITV)
Dez almost destroys the comic book shop when Tsuni leaves him in charge for the afternoon. He assumes it must be the easiest job in the world, so he doesn't really listen to Tsuni's instructions. But the moment she's gone, everything goes haywire. Comic books fly off the shelves, a plant tries to eat Puffin – the shop itself gets up on chicken legs and runs away. Dez realizes that jobs are a lot harder than they look. And more importantly he realizes he should have listened to Tsuni!
33	"Chill, Moms"	John Hazlett	Jason Armstrong, Frank Ramirez	23 January 2018 (CITV)
When Puffin wishes he was guest of honor at a dinner, he's transported to the underworld. He quickly realizes he's not the guest, but the main dish for King of the Underworld's family dinner. Puffin stalls for time, hoping his buddies will rescue him. When they're a no show, he offers to act as chef and cook his own tail feathers while looking for a way to escape. Finally, he decides to turn siblings against siblings in a last ditch effort to save his hide.
34	"You've Been Funky Warlocked"	Christine Mitchell	Jason Armstrong, Frank Ramirez	23 January 2018 (CITV)
When the gang wishes G the Gargoyle could hang out, the entire city is threatened. With no gargoyle protection, King of the Underworld evicts Dez from his building, the Kraken approaches by sea, and a comet is going to crash into earth. While Puffin and Akiko try to get weighty G back on his perch, Dez battles the King of the Underworld for permission to stay in the building. But will Dez get some insight into Janice the Doorperson, goddess of the threshold, before it's too late?
35	"We Can Eat Sand!"	Dan Williams	Tim O'Halloran, Christopher Richards	24 January 2018 (CITV)
When Akiko wishes the comic book shop was less crowded, everyone in town vanishes. Puffin thinks it's a special birthday wish, but Dez and Akiko think everyone is gone for good. After doing crazy stuff around town, Puffin gets quickly bored. When he learns the truth that they're the last people on earth he scours town looking for signs of life. When they find no one, they all regress, go crazy, move to the beach, and start to eat sand. That's when the boat shows up...
36	"We Are Cheetah Face!"	Lienne Sawatsky	Tim O'Halloran, Christopher Richards	24 January 2018 (CITV)
When the gang wishes for a shortcut to fame, they become roadies for the Lead Dude of Rock. They try to escape, but the Lead Dude's powerful rock forcefield stops them. Before they know it, they're lugging equipment and taking care of his hygiene. A chance encounter with Fireball Cat makes them think they have to believe in themselves in order to be free. But they're wrong. The key is practice. But will they have enough time to learn how to play music to win the Battle of the Bands of their souls.
37	"Needs Ketchup"	John Hazlett	Jason Armstrong, Frank Ramirez	25 January 2018 (CITV)
Akiko gets in trouble when she wishes the guys would lose honorably at table tennis. She gets placed in a wish puzzle waiting room. Fireball Cat appears to show Dez and Puffin a trio of riddles they must solve in order to release their friend. After watching a sumo tale, a ghost story, and a futuristic robo-table-tennis yarn, the guys (and Akiko) don't seem any closer to understanding the riddle. Until Dez and Puffin remember what truly makes Akiko a legendary friend.
38	"Chopped Salad!"	Lienne Sawatsky	Jason Armstrong, Frank Ramirez	25 January 2018 (CITV)
While buying a gift for Dez, Puffin and Akiko get trapped on a cursed Chopped Salad truck. Coming to their rescue, Dez knows the only escape is to trap someone else in their place. But he feels guilty when he learns how mean chopped salad patrons are. The only person they feel good about trapping is Dusty, so they use a neon barracuda to lure her back on the truck. But even that makes Dez feel guilty. So instead he decides to break the city's Chopped Salad fad and get rid of the truck for good.
39	"Clown Shoes Never Solved Anything"	Dan Williams	Tim O'Halloran, Christopher Richards	26 January 2018 (CITV)
When Dez makes a wish on himself in a mirror, he causes dimensions to collide. First, doppelgängers of Dez, Puffin, and Akiko arrive (with the new Dez being slightly taller because of Dez's wish). And they all get along famously. But Fireball Cat reveals to them that the dimensions will destroy the planet. They have to uncollide, and fast. They need mirrors! When the house of mirrors smashes into itself, the gang needs to find another one. But not before they rescue two runaway roller coasters.
40	"Happy Green Weirdo Day!"	Christine Mitchell & John Hazlett	Tim O'Halloran, Christopher Richards	26 January 2018 (CITV)
Bored with Leprechaun Day, Dez wishes he wasn't a leprechaun. And it comes true. He's not a leprechaun. And neither are his parents. Dez is upset because he didn't really mean it, but he's devastated when he learns that ALL MAGIC is gone! With Tsuni swimming in the canal, and Fireball Cat acting like "just a cat", Dez has to figure out how to return magic to the world. The solution lies in a four-leaf clover and the very complicated, non-magical plan to retrieve it.

== Broadcast ==
Wishfart debuted on CITV in the United Kingdom on 5 September 2017. The show also debuted on Discovery Italia (K2, in Italian) on 6 November 2017, on Cartoon Network Africa on 1 January 2018, and on RTBF (Belgium, in French) on 10 February 2018. Then the show finally made its official premiere on Teletoon on 9 June 2018, right after its Canadian-French premiere Télétoon (français) on 27 May 2018. The show then made its second UK appearance on Cartoon Network UK on 8 June 2018. It premiered on Russia's Telekanal 2X2 on 27 August 2018. It started airing in Poland on TeleTOON+ on 16 August 2019, replacing Trollhunters. In Norway it is broadcast on NRK Super. It was expected to debut in France on Canal+ (in French), on Niki Kids in Ukraine, and on Australia's ABC in 2019. The show aired on RTP2 in Portugal on August 9, 2021. In the United States, it was released on Kidoodle.TV on 9 December 2021, but got removed sometime between late 2023 to early 2024.

In September 2024, Wishfart, along with new additional making of content, was released on the crypto-based online streaming platform Gala Film.

== Reception ==
The series received five nominations at the 2019 Canadian Screen Awards in the categories of Best Direction (Animation), Best Sound (Animation), and Best Writing (Animation), with three of those nominations being in the last category. It was also nominated for an Award of Excellence for Best Program (Animation – Ages 9+) from the Youth Media Alliance in 2019, and won the Writers Guild of Canada's Screenwriting Award in the Children's category that same year.

Chris Robinson of Cartoon Brew gave the series a positive review, describing it as "a beautifully conceived, designed, and written work subtly loaded with positive messages about diversity, the chaos of youth, materialism, identity, and self-control/reliance" and remarking how the show stood in contrast with the "loud and boorish" nature of most animated TV shows.
