= Dodgy =

English rock band

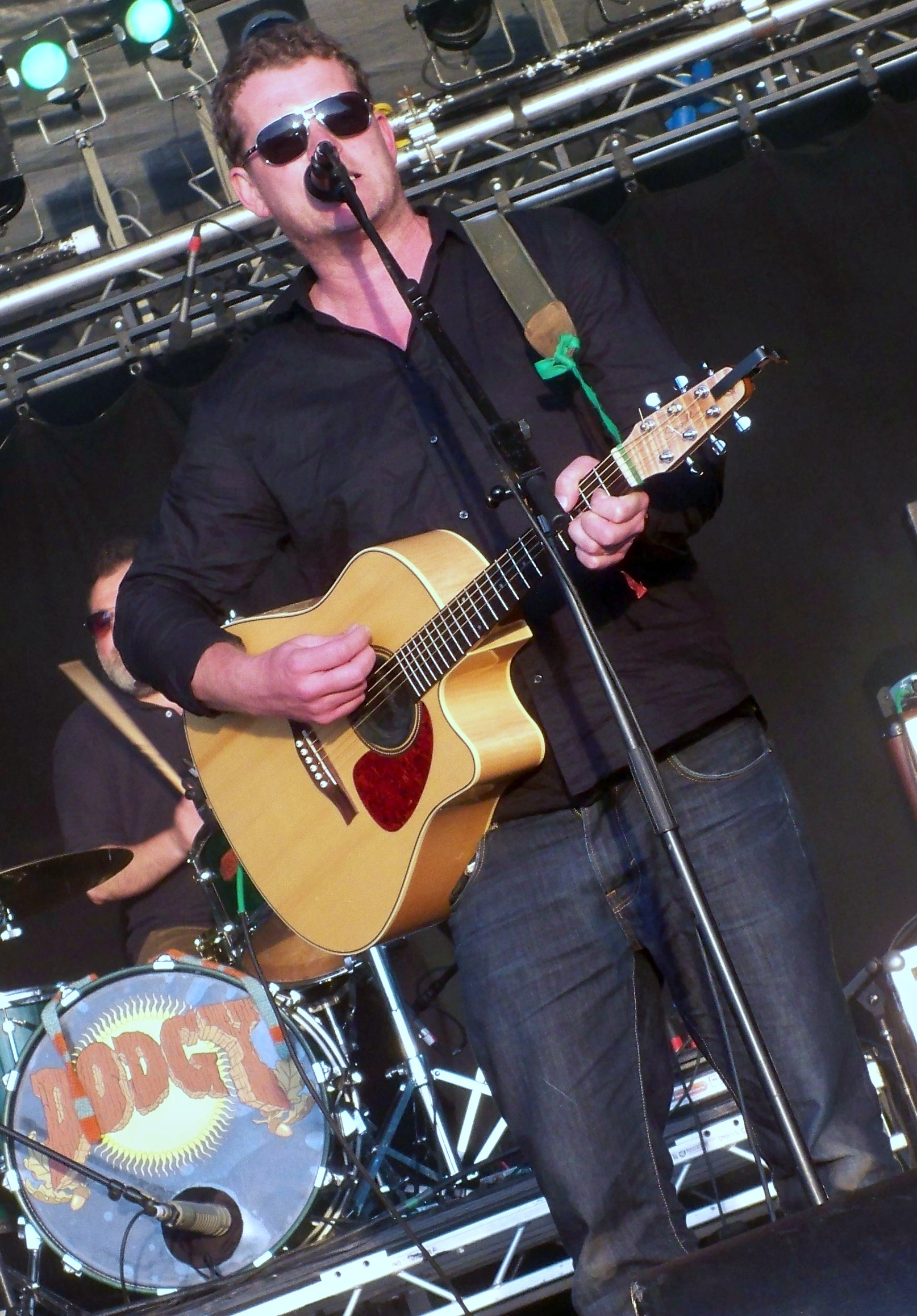
- Nigel Clark playing an acoustic set at Guilfest in 2012.

Background information
- Origin: Hounslow, London, England
- Genres: Alternative rock, power pop, Britpop
- Years active: 1990–1998, 1999–2002, 2007–present
- Labels: A&M, Bostin'
- Members: Nigel Clark; Mathew Priest; Andy Miller; Stuart Thoy
- Past members: Frederic Colier; Ben Lurie

Dodgy are an English rock band formed in Hounslow in 1990. The band rose to prominence during the Britpop era of the 1990s. They are best known for their hits "Staying Out for the Summer", "If You're Thinking of Me", and "Good Enough," which was their biggest hit, reaching No. 4 on the UK Singles Chart. The original lineup reunited in 2007 and continue to release albums and tour.

== History ==
=== Formation and initial activity (1990–91) ===
The band was formed by Nigel Clark, Mathew Priest, and Andy Miller. Relocating from Worcestershire to London in 1988, Clark and Priest played together in the four-piece Purple, with Frederic Colier on bass and David Griffiths on guitar. After Griffiths departed the lineup, they recruited guitarist Ben Lurie, who left the band after one week to join The Jesus and Mary Chain and was replaced by Andy Miller. After Colier's departure, the remaining trio of Clark, Priest, and Miller renamed the group Dodgy.

The band played an eight-month residency at a wine bar in Kingston Upon Thames and created a following. In 1991, they signed a six-album deal with A&M Records and signed publishing with BMG.

=== The Dodgy Album, Homegrown, Free Peace Sweet (1993-97) ===
Dodgy's debut album, titled The Dodgy Album, was released on 24 May 1993 and produced by The Lightning Seeds' Ian Broudie. The album features the singles "Water Under the Bridge" and "Lovebirds."

The band's breakthrough was the sophomore album Homegrown, which was released on 24 October 1994 and peaked at No. 28 on the UK Albums Chart. The album featured the tracks "So Let Me Go Far," Grassman," and the band's first hit "Staying Out for the Summer" which originally peaked at #38, though a remixed version of the song would reach #19 the following year.

On 17 June 1996, Dodgy released their double platinum third album Free Peace Sweet. The album reached as high as number seven in the UK, being certified platinum by the British Phonographic Industry (BPI) in November 1996. By March 1997, the album had sold 400,000 copies in the UK. The 4 singles from the album reached the Top 20 including "In a Room" at #12, "If You're Thinking of Me" at #11, "Found You" at #19, and the band's most successful single "Good Enough" reaching #4. "Good Enough" was certified silver by the BPI in 2015. According to Clark, who wrote "Good Enough," the song was written towards his son and becoming a father. It was influenced by the positive vibes of Bob Marley, George Harrison, and Karen Carpenter, which was the music he was listening to the week he wrote the track. "Good Enough" was featured on the soundtrack to the film Sliding Doors (1998).

Dodgy concerned themselves with social issues by supporting The Serious Road Trip, War Child, the Liverpool Dockers' Strike, Charter88 and youth democracy campaigns. The band became the second UK act, after China Drum, to play in Sarajevo after the lifting of the siege, giving a concert at the Kuk club in August 1996, politely declining a support slot at Knebworth for Oasis. They did so, feeling enough good bands were already playing that event and by flying out to the recovering country, they would hopefully later influence others to follow in future.

Following the success of Free Peace Sweet, Nigel Clark left the band due to frustrations with the record label, and to raise his 2 children. Meanwhile, Matthew Priest and Andy Miller continued the band as a five-piece with vocalist David Bassey, keyboardist Chris Hallam, and bassist Nick Abnett. This line-up of the group recorded one album, Real Estate, in 2001. The album was produced and mixed with Robin Evans at T-Pot Studios in Perthshire.

=== Band reunion and new music (2006-present) ===
In 2006, Clark released the solo album 21st Century Man In 2007, he teamed up with the dance music duo SFG to record a remix of Dodgy's "Good Enough". Clark would rejoin Dodgy in 2007, 10 years after his departure before the band's comeback tour.

The band played two sets at Guilfest in July 2008. The first was an acoustic set in the Unison tent, where they appeared in support of the organisation. They later played a set with the full band on the main stage. They headlined the Sunday night at Beached Festival in August 2008, and appeared at the ToneFest in September. In November, the first tracks from new recording sessions appeared online. They played a benefit show in May 2009, as part of the homelessness charity Crisis' 'Hidden Gigs' campaign, alongside The Bluetones.

In 2009, Dodgy played at the famed Glastonbury Festival, with headliners Bruce Springsteen, and Neil Young. On 29 August 2010, Dodgy played at The Galtres Festival in North Yorkshire, playing classic songs such as "In a Room" and "Staying out for the Summer", as well as a version of Nigel Clark's solo track, "21st Century Man".

On 23 April 2011, Dodgy played as the headliners at the Mash Fest Festival in Trowbridge and on 28 May 2011, Dodgy headlined at the LeeStock Music Festival in Sudbury, Suffolk, helping to raise money for the Willow Foundation. Mathew Priest said in an interview with the BBC that they would be playing a mixture of new songs and old favourites and talking of their new material said "If we can just get people to listen to it, they're going to love it". on 25 August 2011, Dodgy also Headlined at the Garlic Festival, in the Isle of Wight. For live shows promoting the album, the band recruited Stuart Thoy of the band Smoke Feathers to play bass. In May 2012 they played at Lakefest festival.

The reunited lineup would release its first album of new music, Stand Upright in a Cool Place, on 20 February 2012. "What Became of You" was the first single to be taken from their fifth album. Rather than following the trend of bands re-forming to play their classic albums in full, Dodgy announced that on their forthcoming UK tour, it was their new album that would be previewed live in its entirety. The album was released 20 February 2012 via the independent Strikeback Records, to favourable reviews from MOJO and The Guardian. Thoy would then join the band as a full member and participate in the recording of their sixth album, What Are We Fighting For, which was released on 2 September 2016.

Clark released the solo album Make Believe Love in 2020, and also supported disadvantaged children as a music teacher at the Aspire Academy in Worcester.

On 1 May 2026, Dodgy released their 7th studio album, Hello Beautiful, which The Prog Report claims "easily stands alongside their best work from the mid-90s."

== Musical style ==
AllMusic biographer Stephen Thomas Erlewine described the band as "clowns of Brit-pop" that played "infectious, goofy punk-pop", which "alternately sounded like the early Who and the Stone Roses."

== Discography ==
=== Studio albums ===
List of studio albums, with selected chart positions, sales figures and certifications
Title	Album details	Peak chart positions	Sales	Certifications
Title	Album details	UK	Sales	Certifications
The Dodgy Album	Released: 24 May 1993; Label: A&M (540 082); Format: CD, CS, DL, LP	75		
Homegrown	Released: 24 October 1994; Label: A&M (540 282); Format: CD, CS, DL, LP	28		UK: Gold
Free Peace Sweet	Released: 17 June 1996; Label: A&M (540 573); Format: CD, CS, DL, LP	7	UK: 400,000	UK: Platinum
Real Estate	Released: 23 July 2001; Label: Bostin (BTNCD005); Format: CD, DL	—		
Stand Upright in a Cool Place	Released: 20 February 2012; Label: Strike Back (SBR 200); Format: CD, DL, LP	76		
What Are We Fighting For	Released: 2 September 2016; Label: Cherry Red (BRED689); Format: CD, DL, LP	—		
Hello Beautiful	Released: 1 May 2026; Label: Flip Flop Records (HB1 TH77); Format: CD, DL, LP	—		
"—" denotes a release that did not chart or was not released in that territory.

=== Compilation albums ===
Year	Album	^{UK}
1998	Ace A's and Killer B's	55
2004	The Collection	—
2014	Good Enough – The Very Best of Dodgy	—
"—" denotes releases that did not chart.

=== Live albums ===
- So Far on 3 Wheels – Dodgy on the Radio (2007)
- Dodgy – Live at Cornbury Festival (2009)
- Dodgy Live – Back to Back (2013)

=== Singles ===
Year	Title	UK	Certifications
1991	"Summer Fayre"	195	
1991	"Easy Way"	—	
1992	"The Black and White Single"	127	
1993	"Water Under the Bridge"	76	
1993	"Lovebirds"	65	
1993	I Need Another (EP)	67	
1994	The Melod-EP	53	
1994	"Staying Out for the Summer"	38	
1995	"So Let Me Go Far"	30	
1995	"Making the Most Of" (with the Kick Horns)	22	
1995	"Staying Out for the Summer" (remix)	19	
1996	"In a Room"	12	
1996	"Good Enough"	4	BPI: Silver
1996	"If You're Thinking of Me"	11	
1997	"Found You"	19	
1998	"Every Single Day"	32	
2000	"Feathercuts and Monkeyboots"	88	
2001	"(We All Need a Little) Liftin"	—	
2008	Down in the Flood/Forgive Me (Club Tour Mix) (EP)	—	
2012	"What Became of You"	—	
2012	"Only a Heartbeat"	—	
2012	"This Love Is Bigger Than Both of Us"	—	
2016	"California Gold"	—	
2016	"What Are We Fighting For"	—	
2026	"Hello Beautiful"	—	
2026	"Summer Forever"	—	
"—" denotes releases that did not chart.

=== Downloads ===
- "Forgive Me – Demo" (2008)
- "Down in the Flood" (2008)
- "Find a Place" – The Bootleg Series and Crisis Charity Download (2009)
- "Christmas at the Foodbank" (2013 charity release for The Trussell Trust)

== See also ==
- List of Britpop musicians
- List of performers on Top of the Pops
- List of Never Mind the Buzzcocks episodes
