= Jude Cook =

British author

- Occupation: Writer
- Writing career
- Language: English
- Years active: 2014 - present
- Notable works: Byron Easy, Jacob's Advice, Time Being
- Website: judecook.blogspot.com

Jude Cook (born 25 August 1968) is a British novelist. He was a guitarist and singer for the band Flamingoes from 1993 to 2008. His first novel Byron Easy (2013) was followed by Jacob's Advice (2020). In 2025, he founded the UK-based independent small press Conduit Books.

== Early life ==
Jude Cook was born in Hitchin, Hertfordshire. He studied English Literature at University College London.

== Musical career ==
In 1993, Cook founded the indie rock band Flamingoes with his twin brother, James Cook. They made two albums, Plastic Jewels (1995) and Street Noise Invades the House (2007). The band was dissolved in 2008.

== Literary career ==
Cook's first novel Byron Easy was published by William Heinemann in February 2013. The Daily Mail described it as 'Razor sharp... An exuberant debut'. Six years later, he published Jacob's Advice (2020). His third novel, Time Being, was published in September 2026.

Cook has written for The Guardian, the Times Literary Supplement, The Spectator and Literary Review among others. His radio plays Thousand Cranes (2020, dramatised from the novel by Yasunari Kawabata) and The Rival (2021) were broadcast on BBC Radio 3 and BBC Radio 4.

In 2025, he was a judge for the Queen Mary Small Press Fiction Prize. In the same year, he announced that he was founding an independent press named Conduit Books, which would initially publish male authors.
