= Homegrown (Dodgy album) =

Studio album by Dodgy
- Released: 24 October 1994
- Genre: Pop punk, Britpop
- Length: 42:01
- Label: A&M
- Producer: Hugh Jones, Ian Broudie

Dodgy chronology
The Dodgy Album (1993)	Homegrown (1994)	Free Peace Sweet (1996)

Homegrown is the second album by the British indie group Dodgy, released in 1994. The band's record company marketed the album by including cannabis seeds with some promotional copies.

The album peaked at No. 28 on the UK Albums Chart. The first single was "Staying Out for the Summer".

== Critical reception ==
Professional ratings
Review scores
Source	Rating
AllMusic	4.5/5 stars
The Encyclopedia of Popular Music	4/5 stars
Select	2/5 stars

The Guardian stated that "this London guitar trio's main accomplishment is to sound like a synthesis of nearly every band of the early sixties." The Age wrote: "Brits in Beatlesque '60s retro mode, in consciously jolly celebration of good weather, freedom and smoking naughty things."

== Track listing ==
All songs: music by Nigel Clark/Andy Miller, lyrics by Nigel Clark/Mathew Priest

1. "Staying Out for the Summer" – 3:13
2. "Melodies Haunt You" – 3:40
3. "So Let Me Go Far" – 4:05
4. "Crossroads" – 4:05
5. "One Day" – 3:09
6. "We Are Together" – 4:23
7. "Whole Lot Easier" – 2:46
8. "Making the Most Of" – 4:03
9. "Waiting for the Day" – 3:35
10. "What Have I Done Wrong?" – 1:53
11. "Grassman" – 7:05

== Personnel ==
- Nigel Clark - lead vocals, bass guitar, additional guitar & keyboards
- Andy Miller - guitars, backing vocals
- Mathew Priest - drums, percussion, backing vocals

with

- Rob Lord - keyboards & piano on all tracks except "Melodies Haunt You", "One Day" & "Waiting for the Day"
- Zeb Jameson - keyboards & piano on "Melodies Haunt You", "One Day" & "Waiting for the Day"
- The Kick Horns - brass on "Melodies Haunt You" & "Making the Most Of"
- Roddy Lorimer - trumpet on "Crossroads"
- Caroline Lavelle, Sonia Slany - strings
