= The Bleach Boys =

English punk rock band

- Origin: Hitchin, Hertfordshire, England,
- Genre: Punk rock
- Years active: 1976–present
- Label: Zombie International
- Members: Matt – Vocals; Rocket – Guitar; Mark – Drums; Phil – Bass; Jon
- Past members: Phnuff; Frankenstein; Aidie; Jimmy Jesus; Tony Nuke; Gez Nuke; Sean (Beanie); Rob
- Website: http://www.thebleachboys.co.uk

The Bleach Boys are an English punk rock band, originally from Hitchin, Hertfordshire, England, who have been together since 1976.

Originally known as the Fur Coughs, the group's first gig was on 9 April 1977 supporting Ultravox at Hitchin College (now known as North Herts College). Their new name was given to them by the philosopher Simon Critchley, and is a play on The Beach Boys. Over the years, the band have released a series of records including in 1978 their 7-inch single "Chloroform", which was featured in Record Collector as one of the most collectable punk singles. Recent releases have been all on CD, the latest being We've Got the Bomb released on their own Zombie International label.

In 2022 Phnuff original founding member and bass guitarist died suddenly from heart complications. A memorial gig was organised in his honour at Club 85, in Hitchin. Raising a considerable sum for the Stroke Association.

In 2023 Phil joined the band on Bass Guitar.

A recent change in line up saw Rob Hague ex of S*M*A*S*H leaving to be replaced by Mark who became the ninth drummer to be used by the Bleach Boys.

The band played the Rebellion Festival in Blackpool, England, in 2010 and 2011 and earlier in 2011, recorded a new two track CD single with Andy Davis, who was responsible for their first CD. This was released in December 2011 and features the new songs "Guantanamo Baby" and "Deathlist 2". The band returned to Rebellion in 2016; the festival's 20th year.

On 9 July 2010, the band played the ROTW festival in their hometown of Hitchin. The irony being that after 34 years of existence, they were on the "BBC Introducing" stage. Subsequently, a live recording of "Gauntanamo Baby" from the event was broadcast on BBC Three Counties Radio.

The band's latest recording is a split vinyl single on No Front Teeth Records, featuring "Guantanamo Baby" and "Deathlist 2".

In 2015, Frankenstein, the band's original founder and vocalist died after a long battle with leukaemia. The band organised a charity gig in Hitchin and raised thousands of pounds in favour of Bloodwise, the charity which provided support to his family. With the help of Rave Up Records from Rome, the band released a 12 vinyl single of old songs entitled Fur Cough from the Grave, some of which were previously unreleased, specifically in Frankenstein's memory.

September 2018 saw the band in Sound Savers Studio in Homerton, recording three tracks; "Tapeworm", "Plastic Sex" and "No Moral Fibre". These were released on vinyl and as downloads in December 2018 No Moral Fibre with a limited-edition version limited edition

== Discography ==
- "Chloroform" / "You've Got Nothing" – 7 inch single (1978)
- "Stocking Clad" – 12 inch single (1982)
- "Children of Wallyworld Go Wild for Kicks" – cassette (1983)
- 4 Cyclists of the Apocalypse – CD (1987)
- "The Bicycle Song" – 7 inch single (1992)
- Taking the O out of Country – CD (2002)
- Brain Plug Ins Spaghetti – CD compilation (2004)
- We've Got the Bomb – CD (2009)
- "Guantanamo Baby" / "Deathlist 2" – CD single (2011)
- "Guantanamo Baby" / "Deathlist 2" – split vinyl single (2014)
- Fur Cough from the Grave – 12" inch vinyl album (2016)
- "No Moral Fibre" / "Tapeworm" / "Plastic Sex" – 7" inch vinyl single (2018)
