= (Come on, Join) The High Society =

Studio album by These Animal Men
- Released: 1994
- Genre: Indie rock
- Label: Hi-Rise
- Producer: Dave Eringa

These Animal Men chronology
Too Sussed? (1994)	(Come on, Join) The High Society (1994)	Taxi for These Animal Men (1995)

(Come on, Join) The High Society is the debut album by the English band These Animal Men, released in 1994. The first single was "Speed King".

The album peaked at No. 62 on the UK Albums Chart. The band supported the album with a North American tour.

== Production ==
The album was produced by Dave Eringa. The American release was repeatedly delayed, with a different track listing than the original English album.

== Critical reception ==
Professional ratings
Review scores
Source	Rating
AllMusic	3/5 stars
Drowned in Sound	8/10
The Encyclopedia of Popular Music	3/5 stars
Martin C. Strong	6/10

Trouser Press called the album "a compelling bolt of content, not posture," praising the "taut songwriting, good singing, buzzing electricity and a dynamic grasp." CMJ New Music Monthly deemed most of the tunes "incredibly weak readings of generic songs from the early-'70s leather and mascara crowd." The Washington Post wrote: "Drawing on mod and glitter-rock precedents, songwriters/guitarists Boag and Hooligan have constructed lush pop fantasias that recall 'All the Young Dudes' more than 'Anarchy in the U.K.'"

Drowned in Sound opined that "stop-start punchdrunk anthems like 'Sharp Kid' and 'Too Sussed?' defined their generation more succinctly than 'Parklife' and gave people like Elastica a platform on which to kickstart their career."

== Track listing ==
No.	Title	Length
1.	"Sharp Kid"
2.	"Empire Building"
3.	"Ambulance"
4.	"This Year's Model"
5.	"You're Always Right"
6.	"Flawed Is Beautiful (Edit)"
7.	"This Is the Sound of Youth"
8.	"Sitting Tenant"
9.	"Too Sussed?"
10.	"(Come on, Join) The High Society"
11.	"We Are Living"
12.	"High Society (Return)"
