= Free Peace Sweet =

Studio album by Dodgy
- Released: 17 June 1996
- Studio: Wessex Sound; Battery; Orinoco
- Genre: Britpop
- Length: 64:28
- Label: A&M
- Producer: Hugh Jones

Dodgy chronology
Homegrown (1994)	Free Peace Sweet (1996)	Real Estate (2001)

Singles from Free Peace Sweet
- 1. "In a Room" Released: 27 May 1996; 2. "Good Enough" Released: 29 July 1996; 3. "If You're Thinking of Me" Released: 4 November 1996; 4. "Found You" Released: 3 March 1997

Free Peace Sweet is the third studio album by English rock band Dodgy. It was released on 17 June 1996 through A&M Records. Following frequent touring in the support of their second studio album Homegrown (1994), the band recorded its follow-up in Wessex Sound Studios in London with producer Hugh Jones. Additional recording was later done at Battery and Orinoco Studios.

Free Peace Sweet received generally favourable reviews from critics, some of whom saw it as a strong but underwhelming collection of songs. The album reached number seven in the UK Albums Chart, eventually being certified platinum by the British Phonographic Industry (BPI). Out of all its singles, "Good Enough" peaked the highest at number 4 in the UK. Bookending a three month UK tour, "In a Room" and "Good Enough" were released as the album's first two singles in May and July 1996, respectively. "If You're Thinking of Me" and "Found You" followed as the third and fourth singles in November 1996 and March 1997. "Good Enough" would be certified silver by the BPI in 2015.

== Background and recording ==
Dodgy released their second studio album Homegrown in October 1994. It peaked at number 28 on the UK Albums Chart; all of its singles peaked within the UK top 40, with an alternative version of "Staying Out for the Summer" reaching the highest at number 19. The album was promoted with a UK tour at the end of 1994, and constant touring throughout 1995, which included their first tour to mainland Europe and Japan, as well as supporting the Cranberries in the UK. Frontman Nigel Clark lived in a flat in Primrose Hill with his pregnant wife; he wrote new material and demoed songs on a TASCAM four-track recorder. They had 35 songs in the running for inclusion on their next album, which were eventually whittled down. Free Peace Sweet was produced by Hugh Jones at Wessex Sound Studios in London with engineer Robin Evans.

They picked this studio so that Clark could return to his family each night, having moved to the Stoke Newington district of London. The close proximity also enabled Clark to spend evenings writing more material with the intention of showing the other members his work the very next day. While Homegrown was recorded with a basic band set up, for Free Peace Sweet, they used different methods of recording. For "Ain't No Longer Asking", this meant set up with a PA system, playing the drum track through this and recording the output. Additional recording was done at Battery and Orinoco Studios, both which served as the mixing locations for the recordings. Jones did the mixes with engineer Helen Woodward, before the album was mastered by Ian Cooper at Metropolis Studios with digital editing done by Crispin Murray.

== Composition and lyrics ==
Free Peace Sweet is a Britpop album that takes influence from the works of Beastie Boys, Crosby, Stills & Nash and Dr. John. Long-term live member Richard Payne contributed keyboards throughout the album. Jerome de Pietro did additional programming and remixing on interlude pieces and "Intro". The Kick Horns appeared on "In a Room", "Good Enough", "Jack the Lad" and "Homegrown". Janet Ramus and Michele Douglas of the London Community Gospel Choir sung additional vocals on "You've Gotta Look Up", "If You're Thinking of Me" and "Prey for Drinking". Nick Ingman arranged the strings that are heard on "If You're Thinking of Me", "One of Those Rivers" and "Long Life".

"In a Room" originally had a slower tempo, giving the song Neil Young-esque feel to it, until one of the members suggested playing it faster. Both it and "Trust in Time" incorporate influence from the work of the Who. The band came up with the drum pattern for "You've Gotta Look Up" after visiting a go-go club. Guitarist Andy Miller theorised that the vibraphone solo, which was performed by Teena Lyle, might have been inspired by "A Girl Like You" (1994) by Edwyn Collins. The track was an example of Clark coming up with the chorus and version lyrics and drummer Matthew Priest would help finish them; Miller said this happened previously with the Homegrown songs "Making the Most Of..." and "So Let Me Go Far".

The final version of "Good Enough" evolved from a demo that Clark made, which featured a Lee Dorsey drum loop. Clark wanted the song to have a positive atmosphere akin to Kaya (1978) by Bob Marley, which is one of Clark's favourite albums. He also drew influence from the music of Karen Carpenter and George Harrison. Priest came up with the drum pattern during a break at Wessex Sound Studios, which Clark, Miller and Jones overheard. They promptly expanded on this to a full song. "Ain't No Longer Asking" comes across as a mix of "Loser" (1993) by Beck and "Rocks" (1994) by Primal Scream.

Discussing "One of Those Rivers", Miller said when they were driving through Scotland, their tour manager would take an alternate route via Northumberland. On one occasion, Priest commented on the view he was witnessing; Clark wrote some words down and showed Priest a few months later. He came up with the first verse of what would become "One of Those Rivers", with Priest writing the other verses. Tim Kent of the Rockingbirds contributed banjo to the song. "Prey for Drinking", "Jack the Lad" and "Long Life" form a musical suite. "Jack the Lad" dated from five years prior, when their manager once sent the band to a farmhouse in Hendre-Ddu, Wales, where they came up with the basic form of the song. Consumable Online writer Tim Kennedy said the song's lyrics "appear to refer to a certain lad's excess and bad behaviour leading to the inevitable".

Miller thought Clark had his son in mind when writing "Long Life", alongside Animal Farm (1944) by George Orwell. "U.K.R.I.P." retreads the lyrical theme of "Grand Old English Oak Tree" from their debut studio album The Dodgy Album (1993), with an emphasis on what Miller saw as "trying to distance ourselves from the jingoistic, xenophobic bullshit that Britpop was throwing up". He thought they were evoking the Clash "via Future Sound of London and maybe Senser". Priest wrote the song's chorus and second verse, while Clark wrote the first verse. The album's closing track "Homegrown" was written before the band's album of the same name and did not fit within the rest of that material. They had previously recorded a version of the song at the Tardis studio in Liverpool; as they were unable to replicate of it during the Free Peace Sweet sessions, they opted to take portions of that original recording.

== Release ==
"In a Room" was released as the lead single from Free Peace Sweet on 27 May 1996. The 7-inch vinyl version included "Out Clubbing", while the CD version featured "Self Doubt", an acoustic version of "Long Life" and a remix of "U.K.R.I.P." renamed "Jungle UK (No Rest in Peace)", which was done by Pietro and Phil Mossman. The single was promoted with a short, four date tour of the UK, running into early June 1996. Free Peace Sweet was released on 17 June 1996 through A&M Records. The artwork features a tree, which is a reference to "Grand Old English Oak Tree". The vinyl version included two extra songs, namely, "Is It Me?" (at the end) and "Grateful Moon" (after "Good Enough"). Between July and September 1996, the band embarked on The Summer Big Top Trip tour across the UK, which included an appearance on the main stage of the Reading Festival, with a variety of supporting acts. "Good Enough" was released as a single on 29 July 1996. The 7-inch vinyl version included "Nutters", while the CD version featured "Speaking in Tongues" and "Lovebirds on Katovit". The music video for "Good Enough" was planned to be filmed in India, before it was ultimately shot in Jamaica. "If You're Thinking of Me" was released as a single on 4 November 1996. The 7-inch vinyl version included a live acoustic version of "In a Room", while the CD version featured "Pebblemilljam", "Forever Remain" and an alternative version of "Good Enough". The music video for "If You're Thinking of Me" was filmed in Malta in a pool that was set up specially for filming.

"Found You" was released as a single on 3 March 1997; "You've Gotta Look Up" was in the running to be the fourth single, until "Found You" was ultimately chosen. The 7-inch vinyl version included a cover of the Small Faces' song "I Can't Make It" (1967) and a cover of the Beatles' "Revolution" (1968), while the CD version featured "I Can't Make It", a live version of "Stand by Yourself" and an alternative version of "Found You". The music video for "Found You" was filmed in Andorra and centred around snowboarding. Mercury Records was planning on releasing the album in the US in March 1997, before being pushed back to May to eventually being shelved. Dodgy's co-manager Dave Crompton commented that Mercury planned on releasing a single first but the band was against it, saying: "We think their attitude was, 'We'll put it out and see what happens,' and we said, 'We want to have a career. We've got one in England and Europe, and we want one in the U.S. as well.'" The band eventually parted ways with Mercury; Crompton and partner Andrew Winters were aiming to find a new label to release the album later in the year.

A&M Records released the Free Peace Sweet: The Singles Collection in 1997, which was a box set that encouraged fans to collect all of the singles on CD. It included an exclusive live CD; "In a Room" was recorded at MTV, while "Trust in Time", "Big Brown Moon" and "Homegrown" were recorded at the University of East Anglia in Norwich. "In a Room", "If You're Thinking of Me", "Good Enough", "Ain't No Longer Asking" and "Found You" were included on the band's first compilation album Ace A's + Killer B's (1999). "In a Room", "Good Enough", "Found You" and "Homegrown" were included on the band's second compilation album The Collection (2004). "In a Room", "If You're Thinking of Me", "Good Enough", "Ain't No Longer Asking", "Found You" and "Homegrown" were included on the band's third compilation album Good Enough: The Very Best Of (2013).

== Reception ==
Professional ratings
Review scores
Source	Rating
AllMusic	4/5 stars
The Encyclopedia of Popular Music	3/5 stars
NME	7/10
Smash Hits	5/5 stars

Free Peace Sweet was met with generally favourable reviews from music critics. In a review for AllMusic, critic Stephen Thomas Erlewine found Free Peace Sweet to not be as "consistently engaging" as its predecessor, and while their "style is beginning to sound a bit formulaic," he could not deny that they had an "infectious, exciting sound that makes the similarities between their albums forgivable". NME writer Paul Moody thought it was an "exact DNA progression" from their previous two releases; he noted that while there was a variety of musical influences, the album "never threatens to be anything other than a superior example of Bandus Britpopus".

Melody Maker journalist Caitlin Moran said the album had "enough eclecticism" throughout the songs to "keep even the most gnat-brained, Tartrazine-addled pop-kid stuck in for the full 64 minutes". Kennedy said it was a "super effort from the Dodgy chaps, proving their versatility, their chart worthiness, but most of all that they can be evil rock beasts like the best of 'em". Kevin Courtney of The Irish Times said the band had "traded in their fried out old transit van in a hid to get a seat on the bright, shiny Britpop bus, and there's no longer a faint whiff of Crust wafting in the air around them". In his collection The Encyclopedia of Popular Music, Colin Larkin considered it a "solid album containing some memorable songs", though it "fell short of the greatness that many had expected".

Free Peace Sweet charted at number seven in the UK, being certified platinum by the British Phonographic Industry (BPI) in November 1996. By March 1997, the album had sold 400,000 copies in the UK. All of its singles charted highly in the UK: "In a Room" at number 12, "Good Enough" at number four, "If You're Thinking of Me" at number 11 and "Found You" at number 19. "Good Enough" was certified silver by the BPI in 2015. Select ranked Free Peace Sweet at number five on their best albums of 1996, and "Good Enough" at number ten on their list of the best songs of the same year.

== Track listing ==
All songs written by Nigel Clark, Mathew Priest and Andy Miller.

1. "Intro" – 0:47
2. "In a Room" – 4:15
3. "Trust in Time" – 2:41
4. "You've Gotta Look Up" – 5:29
5. "If You're Thinking of Me" – 5:53
6. "Good Enough" – 4:01
7. "Ain't No Longer Asking" – 6:04
8. "Found You" – 4:54
9. "One of Those Rivers" – 7:43
10. "Prey for Drinking" – 3:07
11. "Jack the Lad" – 3:40
12. "Long Life" – 4:47
13. "U.K.R.I.P." – 5:08
14. "Homegrown" – 5:52

== Personnel ==
Personnel per booklet.

Dodgy

- Nigel Clark – lead vocals, bass, acoustic guitar, electric guitar
- Mathew Priest – drums, percussion, backing vocals
- Andy Miller – lead guitar, slide guitar, sitar, backing vocals

Production and design

- Hugh Jones – producer, mixing
- Robin Evans – engineer
- Helen Woodward – mix engineer
- Ian Cooper – mastering
- Crispin Murray – digital editing
- Chris 'Namaste' Priest – design
- Derrick 'Coolio' Santini – photography

Additional musicians

- Richard Payne – keyboards
- Jerome de Pietro – additional programming and remixing on interludes and track 1
- Janet Ramus – additional vocals on tracks 4, 5 and 10
- Michele Douglas – additional vocals on tracks 4, 5 and 10
- The Kick Horns:
  - Tim Sanders – brass on tracks 2, 6, 11 and 14
  - Neil Sidwell – brass on tracks 2, 6, 11 and 14
  - Roddy Lorimer – brass on tracks 2, 6, 11 and 14
  - Simon Clarke – brass on tracks 2, 6, 11 and 14
- Nick Ingman – string arranger on tracks 5, 9 and 12
- Tim Kent – banjo on track 9
- Teena Lyle – vibraphone on track 4

== Charts and certifications ==
=== Weekly charts ===
Chart performance for Free Peace Sweet
Chart (1996)	Peak position
UK Albums (OCC)	7

=== Certifications ===
Certifications for Free Peace Sweet
Region	Certification	Certified units/sales
United Kingdom (BPI)	Platinum	300,000^{^}
^{^} Shipments figures based on certification alone.
