= Done Lying Down =

- Origin: United Kingdom
- Genres: NWONW; indie rock; punk rock
- Years active: 1993–1997, 2006, 2007, 2008, 2013
- Labels: Abstract Sounds (UK), Immaterial (UK)
- Past members: Jeremy Parker (Jack Plug); Glenn Young (Frank Art); Alastair MacMaster (Ali Mac); James Sherry

Done Lying Down were a British-American rock group, active during the mid-1990s. Their reputation for intense, energetic live performances won the group major acclaim in the British music press and a number of devoted fans. The group's sound was a mix of singer Parker's American vocal style and the British punk rock roots of the other three members of the band. Their name was adopted from Parker's previous band in based in Boston, Massachusetts. Done Lying Down's music was commonly described as new wave of new wave and punk by the media. The members of the group were Jeremy Parker (vocals and guitar), Glenn Young (guitar), Ali Mac (bass guitar), and James Sherry (drums).

== Band history ==
Done Lying Down played their first show in London in 1993. At the end of a prolific year, they signed their first record deal with Abstract Sounds. Their first EP, Heart of Dirt received critical acclaim, including being awarded Single of the Week from NME.

In November 1994, the band performed on BBC's Evening Session. The group recorded four Peel Sessions over the course of their career, and were featured at number 10 on John Peel's Festive 50 for 1994.

In 1997, the band worked with producer Garret Lee, to record a B-side for the Chumbawamba release "Amnesia", the follow-up to their hit "Tubthumping".

== Reunions ==
Done Lying Down reformed for occasional gigs in 2006, 2007, 2008 and 2013.

== Discography ==
=== Albums ===
- John Austin Rutledge (1994)
- Kontrapunkt (1996)

=== Singles and EPs ===
- Heart of Dirt EP
- Family Values EP
- Negative One Friends EP
- Just a Misdemeanour EP UK No. 101
- "Scared Too Stiff" (split single w/ Angel Cage)
- Chronic Offender EP
- So You Drive EP
- Can't Be Too Certain EP

=== Compilations ===
- 7 Bands for a Pound! EP, (Black & White Indians)
- Shagging in the Streets, (Fierce Panda)
- Amplified (Abstract Sounds/Black & White Indians)
- Volume 13: The Lucky Issue!, (Volume)
- Space Mountain (compilation album), (Rough Trade)
- Nings of Desire, (Fierce Panda)
