= Radial Spangle =

American indie rock band

Radial Spangle was an American indie rock band from Norman, Oklahoma that released two albums in the 1990s.

The band was formed in 1991 by Alan Laird (vocals, guitar), April Tippens (bass guitar), and former Flaming Lips drummer Richard English. The band members were friends of Mercury Rev—a band whose debut album was engineered by David Fridmann. This album was entitled Ice Cream Headache, and was released in 1993 on the Mint Tea label. The album featured boy/girl vocal harmonies and an array of guitar effects. Shortly after the album was released, English was replaced by Kelsey Kennedy. After another single called "Raze", on Mint Tea, the band signed to Beggars Banquet Records, who released the "Birthday" EP (which included the three tracks recorded for a session for John Peel's BBC Radio 1 show in July) in late 1993, and the band's second album, Syrup Macrame, again with Fridmann at the controls, in August 1994. The band split up in 1996.

Laird later released Radial Spangle songs under the name The Charm Pops, with recordings that included Tippens and Kennedy and a variety of musician friends in completion.

== Discography ==
=== Singles, EPs ===
- Raze EP (1993) Mint Tea
- Birthday EP (1993) Beggars Banquet

=== Albums ===
- Ice Cream Headache (1993) Mint Tea
- Syrup Macrame (1994) Beggars Banquet
