= New wave of new wave =

Early 1990s, pre-Britpop music scene in the United Kingdom

- Etymology: New wave
- Stylistic origins: Alternative rock; mod; new wave; punk rock
- Cultural origins: Early 1990s, United Kingdom

Other topics
- Baggy; Britpop; grebo; Romo; shoegaze

The new wave of new wave (often abbreviated as NWONW) was a British alternative rock scene in the early 1990s. Bands in the scene were influenced by punk rock and new wave acts such as the Clash, Blondie, and Buzzcocks.

New wave of new wave bands included These Animal Men, S*M*A*S*H, and Elastica. The scene struggled after the arrival of Britpop.

== Characteristics ==
Writing about the new wave of new wave band Elastica, author Steven Wells summarised the scene: "The mid-'90s saw a clutch of new punky bands getting a lot of music press attention in the UK. Labelled the ‘new wave of new wave', these bands looked back to The Buzzcocks and Blondie in much the same way that their Britpop compatriots (like Oasis and Blur) looked back to The Beatles and the Small Faces."

The new wave of new wave was short-lived. Several bands involved with the scene were later linked with the more commercially successful Britpop, which immediately succeeded it. The NME played a major part in promoting and covering the genre, and promoted the On event, which featured many of the bands they had labelled NWONW.

In a 1994 feature in Melody Maker, critic Simon Reynolds asserted that the new wave of new wave "resurrected punk's ethics of drug use, ie. speed = good (cos it increases IQ, self-confidence, aggression), dope and E = bad ('cos they make you mellow, quiescent and full of love)." Reynolds also observed that ambient techno was a "readymade enemy" for the NWONW bands, "the '90s subcultural equivalent of the mid-70s hippies."

Reflecting in 2018, Luke Haines of the Auteurs dubbed the new wave of new wave a "trial run" for Britpop and characterised it as "men taking amphetamines and making records that sounded a bit like demos for the first Clash album."

== History ==
In December 1993, These Animal Men (from Brighton), S*M*A*S*H (from Welwyn Garden City), and Echobelly (from London) played the New Art Riot concert at London's 100 Club along with opening act Flamingoes. According to The Guardian, it was the "inaugural gig" of "a scene the music press had dubbed The New Wave of New Wave." It was the biggest show of These Animal Men and S*M*A*S*H's careers up to that point.

The name "new wave of new wave" was coined by NME writers John Harris, Simon Williams, and Paul Moody with the intent of releasing an EP on their own label. They founded the label Fierce Panda in February 1994 and released the EP Shagging in the Streets which sought to pay tribute to and collect the best of the new wave of new wave. They initially intended to release only that EP and cease the label's activity. The release featured These Animal Men, S*M*A*S*H, Blessed Ethel, Mantaray, Done Lying Down, and Action Painting!.

The new wave of new wave scene was enthusiastically supported by the NME and thrived for a short time while Britpop was getting under way. It was led by These Animal Men and S*M*A*S*H.

The scene struggled after the arrival of Britpop. Both These Animal Men and S*M*A*S*H split up by 1998, with These Animal Men having released two albums and S*M*A*S*H one. The Guardian later noted that Elastica were the most commercially viable new wave of new wave band, adding that they "managed to get themselves co-opted into Britpop instead, the minute that became a better scene to be lumped in with."

=== Aftermath ===
John Harris and Paul Moody eventually moved on from Fierce Panda Records, but it continued under Simon Williams. Writing in 2006, Harris referenced his part in the coining of "new wave of new wave" in an article for The Guardian. Reacting to the emergence of new rave, he compared it to his own "piss-poor attempts" at "inventing a supposed youthquake," including the new wave of new wave (which he described as "Britpop without the good bits, circa 1994") and "the New Eclecticism."

On the occasion of the 25th anniversary of Fierce Panda' founding, Simon Williams reflected: "We didn’t think it was going to last 25 days! That was the whole point. It was just a bunch of drunk idiots saying, 'We need to pay tribute to the NWONW' which was a scene we’d completely concocted ourselves, in the same pub!"

== Critical reception ==
In a 1994 feature in Melody Maker, containing an interview with author Jon Savage about the new wave of new wave, critic Simon Reynolds criticised the new wave of new wave bands as a "too literal recreation of punk," compared them to the pub rock bands which came before, and characterised the NWONW as "whiter-than-white rock, mod filtered through punk filtered through the Manics" which "ignores anything that's happened musically since 1978." In turn, Jon Savage responded that "maybe that whiter-than-white rock can seem a thin option compared to the wealth of stuff around, whether it's black-derived or not. But why not make white-boy music?" Reynolds also observed that ambient techno was a "readymade enemy" for the NWONW bands, to which Savage replied, "the NWONW is music that demands that kind of partisanship, and I can easily imagine that if I was a kid who'd gone to see S.M.A.S.H. I might be inspired to want to change my life."

In The Great Indie Discography (2003), M.C. Strong mentioned that the band Shed Seven were initially lumped in with the new wave of new wave; he characterised the scene as "hopelessly contrived" and described S*M*A*S*H and These Animal Men as "run-of-the-mill pseudo-punk revivalists."

In his book Punk - Young, Loud, and Snotty: The Stories Behind the Songs (2004), Steven Wells wrote that "the 'new wave of new wave' band that stood out from all the rest was Elastica," praising their debut album Elastica and adding that "it was packed with top 1977-style pop tunes, and if they 'borrowed' more than a few of their riffs from The Stranglers, Wire and Blondie, so what? It's what they did with those riffs that matters."

In 2009, Ian Gittins of The Guardian wrote that "the New Wave of New Wave was never really much cop." He characterised it as "a music press-concocted punk revival scene based around a handful of long-forgotten bands" and argued that "it predictably foundered as soon as Britpop came along." At the same time, he called Fierce Panda Records "one of the most idiosyncratic and tenacious independent record labels." Another article by The Guardian, written by Jeremy Allen and published in 2014, asserted that the new wave of new wave is remembered as "the most brazen example of media genre-creation in order to flog a product ever." It added that "even the NWONW acronym is nauseating two decades on" and "the music hasn't weathered well either." Allen conceded that Fierce Panda Records "is a veritable institution, on the other hand."

A 2015 Guardian article about S*M*A*S*H and These Animal Men noted that the new wave of new wave "quickly became the punchline to Britpop's joke" but "for a moment, it seemed like the music that mattered." On the subject of These Animal Men, article author James Cook argued that they were "spectacularly right for the mid-90s – ambitious, self-absorbed and hedonistic" and "musically they were prescient too, drawing from punk's mod-glam seedbed: Small Faces, Mott, the Who." He concluded: "in any just world, These Animal Men would have been as big as Oasis."

In a 2018 article for Record Collector, Luke Haines of the Auteurs wrote that "the new wave of new wave was only marginally worse than the old wave of new wave back in 1978."

== See also ==
- Baggy
- Grebo
- New rave
- Microgenre
- Romo
- Shoegaze
