= These Animal Men =

English band

- Origin: Brighton, England
- Genres: Alternative rock; Britpop; new wave of new wave
- Years active: 1989–1998
- Labels: Le Disques De Popcor, Hi-Rise Recordings, Virgin, Hut Recordings
- Past members: Alexander Boag; Julian Hewings; Patrick Murray; Steve Hussey; Craig Warnock; Rob Hague

These Animal Men were an English band active in the 1990s, as part of the New Wave of New Wave, and released two albums before splitting up in 1998.

== History ==
=== These Animal Men ===
These Animal Men formed in Brighton in 1989, signing to Hut Records, an offshoot of Virgin Records in 1993. They gained some press coverage with their first few singles, which featured drug references in both the sleeve artwork and the song lyrics.

Their first album (Come on, Join) The High Society, released on 24 September 1994, was described by the music press, particularly the NME, as being part of the New Wave of New Wave, (alongside contemporaries S*M*A*S*H with whom they released the joint album, "Wheelers, Dealers, Christine Keelers").

During the three years after the release of their first album, their only output was an EP, Taxi for These Animal Men. They released their second album, Accident & Emergency, on 14 April 1997. Despite reported difficulties encountered during recording, including the firing of Hussey, Accident & Emergency received some critical acclaim, but little commercial success. In 1998, the band broke up.

=== Post-break up ===
Later in 1998, Boag, Hewings, Warnock and Hague formed "Mo Solid Gold" with a new singer, K, taking over vocals from Boag and Hewings. The output, influenced by Northern soul, was the 2001 album Brand New Testament released on EMI/Chrysalis Records. Singles for the tracks "David's Soul," "Personal Saviour," "Safe from Harm," and the self-titled "Mo Solid Gold" followed. The group broke up less than a year later.

In 2007, Hewings and Boag formed the band The Orphans with drummer Kev (later replaced by Paul Emons) and producer and keyboardist Tim Howarth. The Orphans released their first album Muff, a blend of glam, punk and garage rock, in 2008 on the Hail Mary label. The Orphans continued to perform live, changed the spelling of their name to "Thee Orphans," and released their second album, Average Kinda Savage. In January 2013, they broke up.

On 11 September 2015, These Animal Men reunited to play a one-off sold-out gig at Heaven in London, alongside S*M*A*S*H, in support of the documentary Flawed is Beautiful, which covered the career of both bands.

== Discography ==
=== Albums ===
- (Come on, Join) The High Society (1994) - UK No. 62
- Accident & Emergency (1997) - UK No. 192

=== Extended plays ===
- Too Sussed? (1994) - UK No. 39
- Taxi for These Animal Men (1995) - UK No. 64

=== Singles ===
- "Wheelers, Dealers, Christine Keelers" (split release with S*M*A*S*H) (1993)
- "Speeed King" (1994) - UK No. 82
- "You're Not My Babylon" (1994) - UK No. 76
- "This Is the Sound of Youth" (1994) - UK No. 72
- "Life Support Machine" (1997) - UK No. 62
- "Light Emitting Electrical Wave" (1997) - UK No. 72

=== Demo ===
- Are You Inexperienced? E.P. (1993)

== Band members ==
- Alexander Boag - vocals, guitar
- Julian Hewings (a.k.a. Hooligan) - backing vocals, guitar
- Patrick Murray - bass
- Steve Hussey (until 1996) - drums
- Craig Warnock (from 1996) - keyboard
- Rob Hague (from 1996) - drums
