= Britpop =

1990s UK pop culture/music movement

- Stylistic origins: Alternative rock; pop rock; British Invasion; Madchester; baggy; glam rock; neo-psychedelia; mod revival; punk rock; indie pop; new wave
- Cultural origins: Early-to-mid 1990s, United Kingdom
- Derivative forms: Post-Britpop; post-punk revival

Subgenres
- New wave of new wave

Other topics
- List of Britpop musicians; British Invasion; Cool Britannia; Cool Cymru; pop-punk; power pop; romo; grunge; shoegaze

Britpop was a British music and cultural movement that emerged in the 1990s. Musically, it produced bright, catchy alternative rock that drew heavily on the traditions of 1960s guitar-based British pop, with lyrics that emphasised national identity and offered commentary on British culture and society. The movement was seen as a reaction against the darker lyrical themes and soundscapes of the American-led grunge and the more introspective shoegaze scene in Britain. It helped bring British alternative rock into the mainstream and became a key part of the broader Cool Britannia phenomenon, which echoed the spirit of the Swinging Sixties.

Britpop also marked the rise of bands emerging from the independent music scene of the early-mid 1990s. Although often described as a cultural moment rather than a strictly defined musical genre, its leading bands shared influences from 1960s British pop, 1970s glam and punk rock, and 1980s indie pop. Manchester's indie scene — including groups such as the Smiths, the Stone Roses, and Happy Mondays — is often cited as an important precursor to Britpop's musical development.

The acts most frequently labelled by the UK music press as Britpop's "big four" were Oasis, Blur, Suede, and Pulp. The period of Britpop's popularity is generally considered to have lasted from 1993 to 1997, with its peak years between 1995 and 1996. A chart rivalry between Blur and Oasis in August 1995, dubbed "The Battle of Britpop", brought the movement to the forefront of the British press. Oasis's (What's the Story) Morning Glory? is among the UK's all-time best-selling albums, illustrating the movement's mainstream reach. While primarily a music-based phenomenon, Britpop also influenced fashion, art, and politics, with Prime Minister Tony Blair and New Labour aligning themselves with the movement.

During the late 1990s, many Britpop acts began to decline commercially, disband, or shift towards new musical styles. As a commercial force, Britpop was soon eclipsed by the rise of teen pop, while artistically it evolved into the post-Britpop indie movement, associated with bands such as Travis and Coldplay.

== Style, roots and influences ==
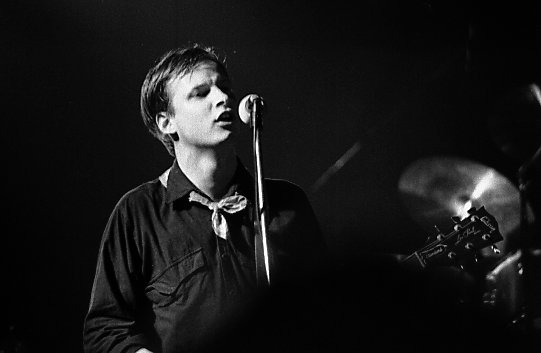
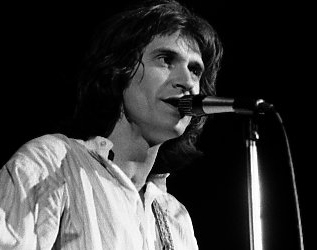
Andy Partridge (left) and Ray Davies (right) are sometimes cited as the "godfathers of Britpop".

Though Britpop has sometimes been viewed as a marketing tool and more of a cultural moment than a distinct musical genre, there are musical conventions and influences the bands grouped under the Britpop term have in common. Britpop bands show elements from the British pop music of the 1960s, glam rock and punk rock of the 1970s, and indie pop of the 1980s in their music, attitude, and clothing. Specific influences vary: Blur drew from the Kinks and early Pink Floyd, Oasis took inspiration from the Beatles, and Elastica had a fondness for arty punk rock, notably Wire and both incarnations of Adam and the Ants. Regardless, Britpop artists project a sense of reverence for British pop sounds of the past. The Kinks' Ray Davies and XTC's Andy Partridge are sometimes advanced as the "godfathers" or "grandfathers" of Britpop, though Davies disputes it. Others similarly labelled include Paul Weller and Adam Ant.

Alternative rock acts from the indie scene of the 1980s and early 1990s were the direct ancestors of the Britpop movement. The influence of the Smiths is common to the majority of Britpop artists. The Madchester scene, fronted by the Stone Roses, Happy Mondays, James and Inspiral Carpets (for whom Oasis's Noel Gallagher had worked as a roadie during the Madchester years), was an immediate root of Britpop since its emphasis on good times and catchy songs provided an alternative to the British-based shoegazing and American based grunge styles of music. In 1991, James's song "Sit Down" reached number two in the UK charts, with Flavorwire writing the song "predates the Britpop label, but it presaged the quintessentially British sound that would explode in the '90s. Entire festival crowds used to sit down during the chorus of this song". Pre-dating Britpop by four years, Liverpool-based group the La's hit single "There She Goes" was described by Rolling Stone as a "founding piece of Britpop's foundation". Naming it his favourite song from the 1990s ("There She Goes" was originally released in 1988), Noel Gallagher once declared that "Oasis want to finish what The La's started".

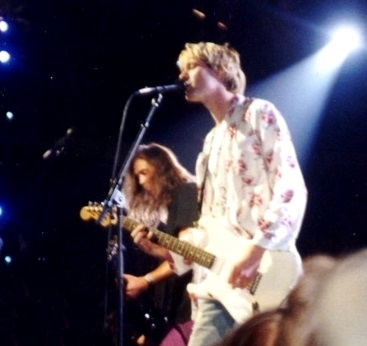
Britpop was partly a reaction to the popularity of Nirvana and the perceived dourness of American grunge music

Local identity and regional British accents are common to Britpop groups, as well as references to British places and culture in lyrics and image. Stylistically, Britpop bands use catchy hooks and lyrics that were relevant to young British people of their own generation. Britpop bands conversely denounced grunge as irrelevant and having nothing to say about their lives. In contrast to the dourness of grunge, Britpop was defined by "youthful exuberance and desire for recognition". Damon Albarn of Blur summed up the attitude in 1993 when after being asked if Blur were an "anti-grunge band" he said, "Well, that's good. If punk was about getting rid of hippies, then I'm getting rid of grunge."

In spite of the professed disdain for the genres, some elements of both crept into the more enduring facets of Britpop. Noel Gallagher has since championed Ride and once stated that Nirvana's Kurt Cobain was the only songwriter he had respect for in the last ten years, and that he felt their music was similar enough that Cobain could have written "Wonderwall". By 1996, Oasis's prominence was such that NME termed a number of Britpop bands (including The Boo Radleys, Ocean Colour Scene and Cast) "Noelrock", citing Gallagher's influence on their music. Journalist John Harris described these bands, and Gallagher, as sharing "a dewy-eyed love of the 1960s, a spurning of much beyond rock's most basic ingredients, and a belief in the supremacy of 'real music'".

The imagery associated with Britpop was equally British and working class. A rise in unabashed maleness, exemplified by Loaded magazine, binge drinking and lad culture in general, would be very much part of the Britpop era. The Union Jack became a prominent symbol of the movement (as it had a generation earlier with mod bands such as the Who) and its use as a symbol of pride and nationalism contrasted deeply with the controversy that erupted just a few years before when former Smiths singer Morrissey performed draped in it. The emphasis on British reference points made it difficult for the genre to achieve success in the US.

== Origins and first years ==
Select magazine's April 1993 issue – with Suede's Brett Anderson on the cover in front of a Union Flag – emphasised "Great British pop"

John Harris has suggested that Britpop began when Blur's fourth single "Popscene" and Suede's "The Drowners" were released around the same time in the spring of 1992. He stated, "[I]f Britpop started anywhere, it was the deluge of acclaim that greeted Suede's first records: all of them audacious, successful and very, very British." Suede were the first of the new crop of guitar-orientated bands to be embraced by the UK music media as Britain's answer to Seattle's grunge sound. Their debut album Suede became the fastest-selling debut album in the history of the UK. In April 1993, Select magazine featured Suede's lead singer Brett Anderson on the cover with a Union Flag in the background and the headline "Yanks go home!" The issue included features on Suede, the Auteurs, Denim, Saint Etienne and Pulp and helped start the idea of an emerging movement.

Blur were involved in a vibrant social scene in London (dubbed "The Scene That Celebrates Itself" by Melody Maker) that focused on a weekly club called Syndrome in Oxford Street; the bands that met up were a mix of music styles, some would be labelled shoegazing, while others would go on to be part of Britpop. The dominant musical force of the period was the grunge invasion from the United States, which filled the void left in the indie scene by the Stone Roses' inactivity. Blur, however, took on an Anglocentric aesthetic with their second album Modern Life Is Rubbish (1993).

Blur's new approach was inspired by a tour of the United States in the spring of 1992. During the tour, frontman Damon Albarn began to resent American culture and found the need to comment on that culture's influence seeping into Britain. Justine Frischmann, formerly of Suede and leader of Elastica (and at the time in a relationship with Albarn) explained, "Damon and I felt like we were in the thick of it at that point ... it occurred to us that Nirvana were out there, and people were very interested in American music, and there should be some sort of manifesto for the return of Britishness." John Harris wrote in an NME article just before the release of Modern Life is Rubbish: "[Blur's] timing has been fortuitously perfect. Why? Because, as with baggies and shoegazers, loud, long-haired Americans have just found themselves condemned to the ignominious corner labelled 'yesterday's thing'." The music press also fixated on what the NME had dubbed the new wave of new wave, a term applied to the more punk-derivative acts such as Elastica, S*M*A*S*H and These Animal Men.

While Modern Life Is Rubbish was a moderate success, Blur's third album, Parklife, made them arguably the most popular band in the UK in 1994. Parklife continued the fiercely British nature of its predecessor, and coupled with the death of Nirvana's Kurt Cobain in April of that year British alternative rock became the dominant rock genre in the country. That same year Oasis released their debut album Definitely Maybe, which broke Suede's record for fastest-selling debut album; it went on to be certified 7× Platinum (2.1 million sales) by the BPI. Blur won four awards at the 1995 Brit Awards, including Best British Album for Parklife (ahead of Definitely Maybe). In 1995, Pulp released the album Different Class which reached number one, and included the single "Common People". The album sold over 1.3 million copies in the UK.

The term "Britpop" arose when the media were drawing on the success of British designers and films, the Young British Artists (sometimes termed "Britart") such as Damien Hirst, and on the mood of optimism with the decline of John Major's government, and the rise of the youthful Tony Blair as leader of the Labour Party. After terms such as "the New Mod" and "Lion Pop" were used in the press around 1992, journalist (and now BBC Radio 6 Music DJ) Stuart Maconie used the term Britpop in 1993 (though recounting the event in a BBC Radio 2 programme from 2020, he believed it may have been used in the 1960s, around the time of the British Invasion). However, journalist and musician John Robb states he had used the term in the late 1980s in Sounds magazine to refer to bands such as the La's, the Stone Roses and Inspiral Carpets.

It was not until 1994 that Britpop started to be used by the UK media in relation to contemporary music and events. Bands emerged aligned with the new movement. At the start of 1995, bands including Sleeper, Supergrass and Menswear scored pop hits. Elastica released their debut album Elastica that March; its first week sales surpassed the record set by Definitely Maybe the previous year. The music press viewed the scene around Camden Town as a musical centre; frequented by groups like Blur, Elastica, and Menswear; Melody Maker declared "Camden is to 1995 what Seattle was to 1992, what Manchester was to 1989, and what Mr Blobby was to 1993."

== "The Battle of Britpop" ==
The UK media extensively covered the chart battle between Blur and Oasis. The anticipation over who would be number one in the week leading up to the chart being announced saw Albarn (left) appear on the ITV News at Ten.

A chart battle between Blur and Oasis, dubbed the "Battle of Britpop", brought Britpop to the forefront of the British press in 1995. The bands had initially praised each other but over the course of the year antagonisms between the two increased. Spurred on by the media, they became engaged in what the NME dubbed on the cover of its 12 August issue the "British Heavyweight Championship" with the pending release of Blur's single "Country House" and Oasis' "Roll with It" on the same day. The battle pitted the two bands against each other, with the conflict as much about British class and regional divisions as it was about music. Oasis were taken as representing the North of England, while Blur represented the South. The event caught the public's imagination and gained mass media attention in national newspapers, tabloids and television news. NME wrote about the phenomenon:

Yes, in a week where news leaked that Saddam Hussein was preparing nuclear weapons, everyday folks were still getting slaughtered in Bosnia, and Mike Tyson was making his comeback, tabloids and broadsheets alike went Britpop crazy.

Billed as the greatest pop rivalry since the Beatles and the Rolling Stones, it was spurred on by jibes thrown back and forth between the two groups, with Oasis dismissing Blur as "Chas & Dave chimney sweep music", while Blur referred to their opponents as the "Oasis Quo" in a deriding of their alleged unoriginality and inability to change. In what was the best week for UK singles sales in a decade, on 20 August, Blur's "Country House" sold 274,000 copies against "Roll with It" by Oasis which sold 216,000, the songs charting at number one and number two, respectively. Blur performed their chart topping single on the BBC's Top of the Pops, with the band's bassist Alex James wearing an 'Oasis' t-shirt. However, in the long run Oasis became more commercially successful than Blur, at home and abroad. In a 2019 interview, Oasis bandleader Noel Gallagher reflected on the chart battle between the two songs, both of which he saw as "shit", and suggested that a chart race between Oasis' "Cigarettes & Alcohol" and Blur's "Girls & Boys" would have had greater merit. He also noted that he and Blur frontman Damon Albarn – with whom Gallagher had enjoyed multiple musical collaborations during the 2010s – were now friends. Both men have noted that they do not discuss their 1990s rivalry, with Albarn adding, "I value my friendship with Noel because he is one of the only people who went through what I did in the Nineties." Noel Gallagher has also described Blur guitarist Graham Coxon as "one of the most talented guitarists of his generation."

== Peak and decline ==
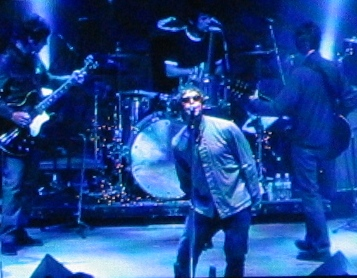
Oasis playing live. NME states, "as (What's the Story) Morning Glory? emerged to colossal sales, it became clear that while Blur had won the battle, Oasis were winning the war."

In the months following the chart battle, NME states, "Britpop became a major cultural phenomenon". Oasis's second album, (What's the Story) Morning Glory?, sold over four million copies in the UK – becoming the fifth best-selling album in UK chart history. Blur's third album in their 'Life' trilogy, The Great Escape, sold over one million copies. At the 1996 Brit Awards, both albums were nominated for Best British Album (as was Pulp's Different Class), with Oasis winning the award. All three bands were also nominated for Best British Group and Best Video, which were won by Oasis. While accepting Best Video (for "Wonderwall"), Oasis taunted Blur by singing the chorus of the latter's "Parklife" and changing the lyrics to "shite life". The Lightning Seeds' single "Three Lions", written to mark the England football team's participation in Euro 96 (which England was hosting), reached number one in the UK charts and became an enduring anthem, with the refrain "It's coming home" a popular chant at England games. Cast's single "Walkaway" memorably featured in the closing footage of the BBC's coverage of England's Euro 96 semi-final.

The adjacent cultural and musical scene in Scotland, dubbed "Cool Caledonia" by some elements of the press, produced a number of successful alternative acts, including the Supernaturals from Glasgow, whose re-released single "Smile" (1997) reached number 25 in the UK charts, and whose album It Doesn't Matter Anymore (1997) entered the top ten, but who failed to sustain their success or achieve the anticipated international breakthrough. The first major band to break through from the Britpop Welsh rock scene, dubbed "Cool Cymru", were Manic Street Preachers, whose singles "Motorcycle Emptiness" (1992) and "A Design for Life" (1996) reached number 17 and 2 on the UK Singles Chart, respectively. Another Welsh Britpop group was Catatonia, whose single "Mulder and Scully" (1998) reached the top ten in the UK, and whose album International Velvet (1998) reached number one. However, they were unable to make much impact in the US and, after personal problems, broke up in 2001.

Oasis' third album Be Here Now (1997) was highly anticipated. Despite initially attracting positive reviews and selling strongly, the record was soon subjected to strong criticism from music critics, record-buyers and even Noel Gallagher himself for its overproduced and bloated sound. Music critic Jon Savage pinpointed Be Here Now as the moment where Britpop ended; Savage said that while the album "isn't the great disaster that everybody says", he commented that "[i]t was supposed to be the big, big triumphal record" of the period. At the same time, Blur sought to distance themselves from Britpop with their self-titled fifth album, assimilating American lo-fi influences such as Pavement. Albarn explained to the NME in January 1997 that "We created a movement: as far as the lineage of British bands goes, there'll always be a place for us ... We genuinely started to see that world in a slightly different way." Cornershop's single "Brimful of Asha", boosted by its remixed version by Fatboy Slim, reached number one in the UK charts, eventually becoming the fifth best-selling Britpop song.

As Britpop slowed, many acts began to falter and broke up. The sudden popularity of girl group the Spice Girls has been seen as having "snatched the spirit of the age from those responsible for Britpop". While established acts struggled, attention began to turn to the likes of Radiohead and the Verve, who had been previously overlooked by the British media. These two bands – in particular Radiohead – showed more esoteric influences and melancholic, sensitive songwriting than earlier Britpop acts. In 1997, Radiohead and the Verve released their respective albums OK Computer and Urban Hymns, both widely acclaimed. This influenced post-Britpop bands such as Travis, Stereophonics, and Coldplay who, with a more introspective sound than mid-1990s Britpop, became some of the most successful rock acts of the late 1990s and early 2000s.

== Successors and revivals ==
=== Post-Britpop ===
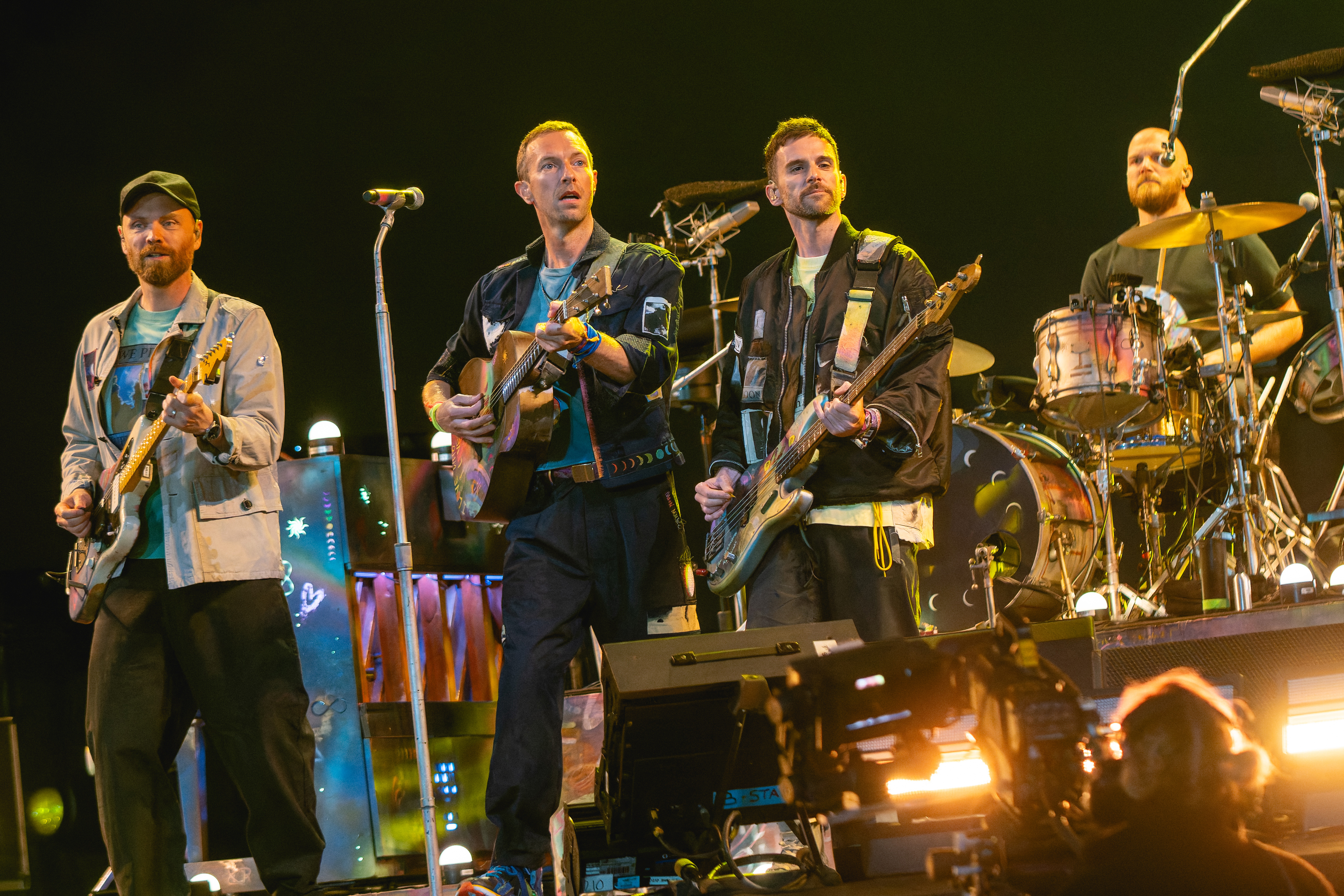
Coldplay, the most commercially successful post-Britpop band, on stage in 2024. Their first three albums – Parachutes (2000), A Rush of Blood to the Head (2002) and X&Y (2005) – are among the best-selling albums in UK chart history.

After Britpop, the media focused on bands that may have been established acts, but had been overlooked due to focus on the Britpop movement. Established English bands such as Radiohead and the Verve, and new acts such as Scotland's Travis and Wales's Stereophonics, and particularly England's Coldplay, achieved wider international success than most of the Britpop groups that had preceded them, and were some of the most commercially successful acts of the late 1990s and early 2000s. These bands avoided the Britpop label while still producing music derived from it. Drawn from across the UK, the themes of their music tended to be less parochially centred on British, English, and London life, and more introspective than had been the case with Britpop at its height. This, beside a greater willingness to woo the American press and fans, may have helped a number of them in achieving international success. They have been seen as presenting the image of the rock star as an ordinary person, or "boy-next-door", and their increasingly melodic music was criticised for being bland or derivative.

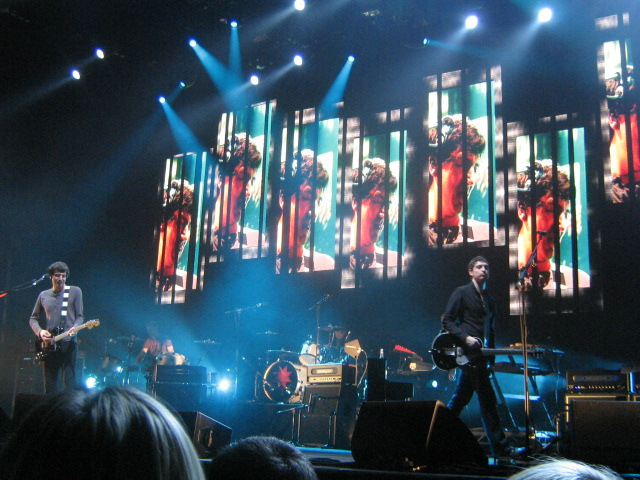
Snow Patrol performing in 2009. Their 2006 single "Chasing Cars" is the most widely played song on UK radio in the 21st century.

These acts were followed by a number of bands who shared aspects of their music, including Snow Patrol from Northern Ireland and Elbow, Embrace, Starsailor, Doves, and Keane from England. The most commercially successful band in the milieu were Coldplay, whose debut album Parachutes (2000) went multi-platinum and helped make them one of the most popular acts in the world by the time of their second album A Rush of Blood to the Head (2002). Keane's debut album Hopes and Fears (2004), which included the lead single "Somewhere Only We Know", became one of the best-selling albums in UK chart history. Snow Patrol's "Chasing Cars" (from their 2006 album Eyes Open) is the most widely played song of the 21st century on UK radio.

=== Post-punk/garage rock revival ===
Bands like Coldplay, Starsailor and Elbow, with introspective lyrics and even tempos, began to be criticised at the beginning of the new millennium as bland and sterile and the wave of garage rock or post-punk revival bands, like the Hives, the Vines, the Strokes, the Black Keys and the White Stripes, that sprang up in that period were welcomed by the musical press as "the saviours of rock and roll". British groups in this vein, including the Libertines, Razorlight, Kaiser Chiefs, Arctic Monkeys and Bloc Party, were viewed by some as a "second wave" of Britpop". These bands have been seen as looking less to music of the 1960s and more to 1970s–1980s punk, new wave, and post-punk, while still being influenced by Britpop. Despite these developments, artists such as Travis, Stereophonics and Coldplay continued to record and enjoy commercial success into the late 2000s.

=== 2010s–2020s Britpop revival ===
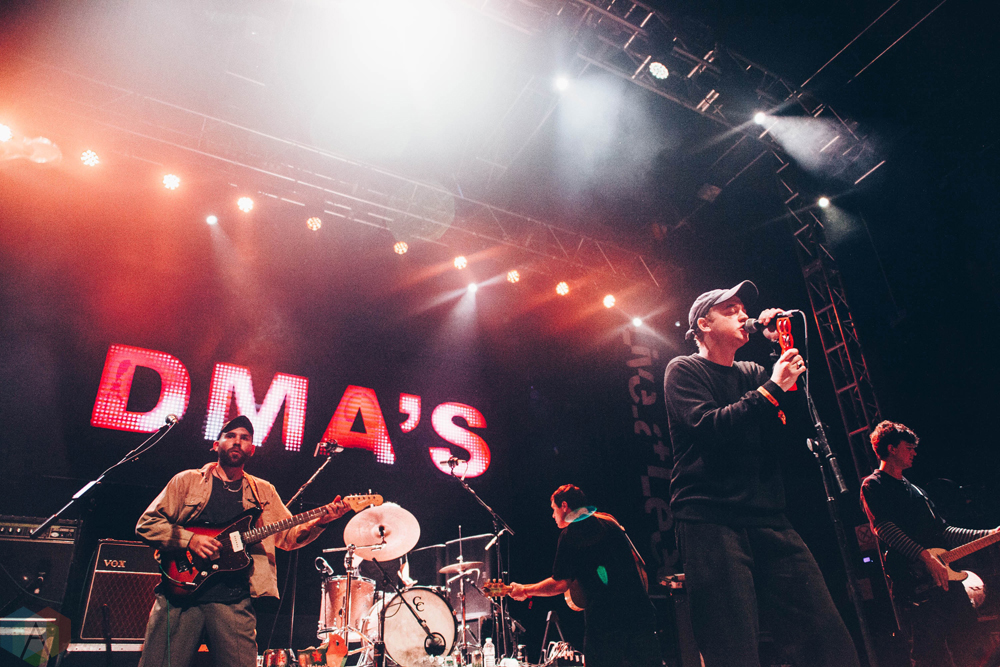
DMA's live at Leeds

At the beginning of the 2010s, a wave of new bands emerged that combined indie rock with the Britpop of the 1990s. Viva Brother launched an update on Britpop, dubbed "gritpop", with their debut album Famous First Words, although they did not receive significant support from the music press. In 2012, All the Young released their debut album, Welcome Home. Later, bands such as Superfood and the Australian band DMA's joined the revival, with DMA's debut album receiving favorable reviews. Several large Britpop bands also began to reunite during this period, with Blur, Suede and Pulp all reforming within a three-year period from 2009 to 2011.

In 2024, Oasis became the highest-profile Britpop band to reunite, announcing they would embark on a world tour the next year. The ensuing Oasis Live '25 Tour was highly successful and was credited with reviving interest in Britpop culture.

== Legacy ==
=== Retrospectives ===
Retrospective documentaries on the movement include The Britpop Story, a BBC programme presented by John Harris on BBC Four in August 2005 as part of Britpop Night, ten years after Blur and Oasis went head-to-head in the charts, and Live Forever: The Rise and Fall of Brit Pop, a 2003 documentary film written and directed by John Dower. Both documentaries include mention of Tony Blair and New Labour's efforts to align themselves with the distinctly British cultural resurgence that was underway, as well Britpop artists such as Damien Hirst.

=== Gender and media critiques ===
Several scholars and journalists have argued that Britpop's media packaging overlapped with the rise of "lad culture", shaping coverage and industry dynamics in ways that often marginalised women's voices. Retrospectives have documented experiences of women musicians during the era and critiqued coverage that prioritised laddish imagery. BBC presenters Jo Whiley and Steve Lamacq have likewise reassessed the scene's relationship with sex and gender in anniversary programming.

=== Usage of term ===
Some artists of the genre have dismissed the "Britpop" term. Oasis bandleader Noel Gallagher denied that the band were associated with the term: "We're not Britpop, we're universal rock. The media can take the Britpop and stick it as far up the back entry of the country houses as they can take it." Blur guitarist Graham Coxon stated in the 2009 documentary Blur – No Distance Left to Run that he "didn't like being called Britpop, or pop, or PopBrit, or however you want to put it." Pulp frontman Jarvis Cocker also expressed his dislike for the term in an interview with Stephen Merchant on BBC Radio 4's Chain Reaction in 2010, describing it as a "horrible, bitty, sharp sound." He would go onto to tell NME in 2025: "I've always hated that word. I would never willingly associate myself with it. ... If that kind of attitude is coming back, then I would be very excited about it, just not the 'BP' word – it's a terrible word."

In 2020, with attention turning to "landfill indie" acts of the 2000s, Mark Beaumont of the NME argued that the term Britpop had been devalued, ignoring all the cultural aspects that had made the scene so important, with the term becoming a "catch-all" for "any band that played guitars in the 1990s."

== See also ==
- 1990s music in the United Kingdom
- Music of the United Kingdom
- Post-Britpop
- List of Britpop musicians
- Cool Britannia
- Cool Cymru
