= List of UK top-ten singles in 1985 =

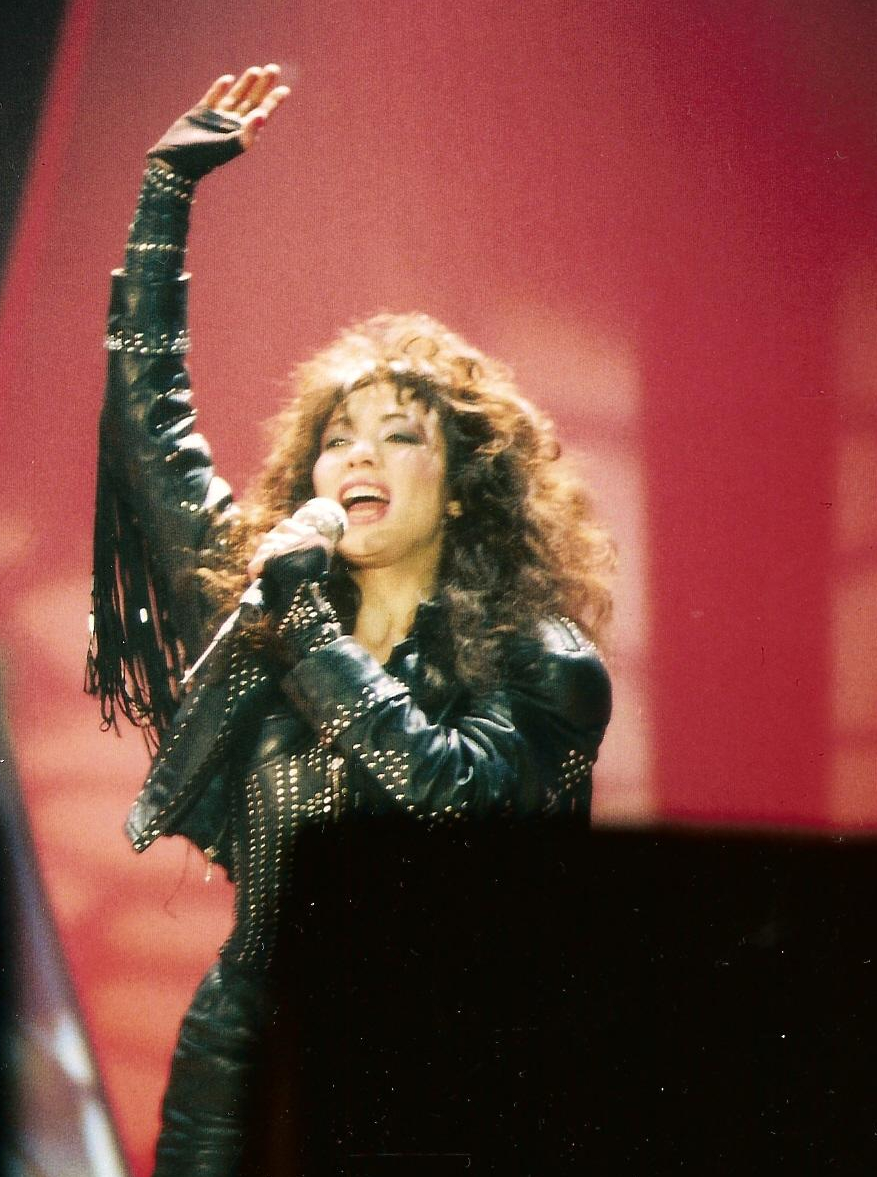
Jennifer Rush had the best selling single of 1985, "The Power of Love", which spent five weeks at number-one and lasted 10 weeks in the top 10.

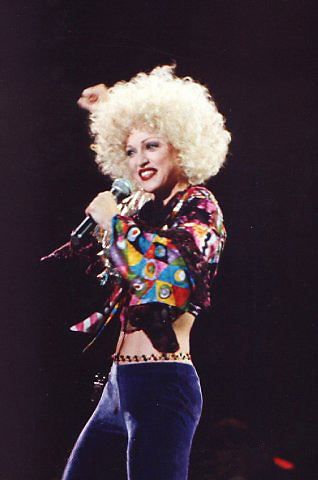
Madonna (pictured in 1993) had a total of eight top 10 singles this year, more than any other artist. The highest charting of these entries was "Into the Groove", which became her first UK number-one single.

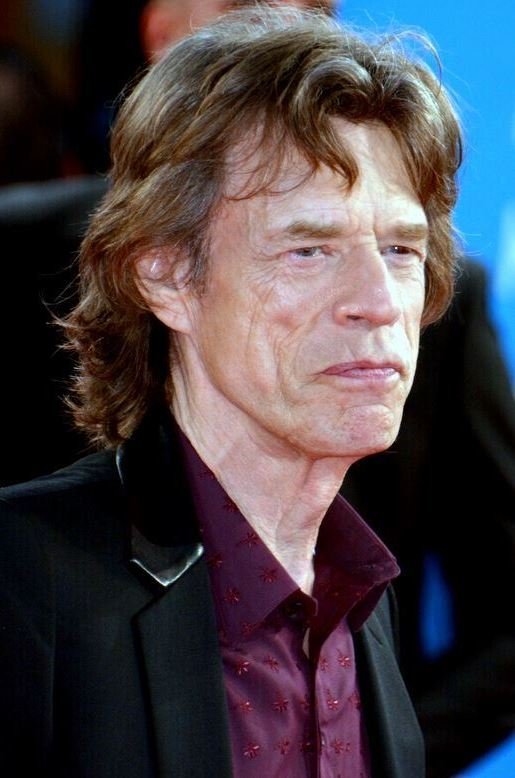
Rolling Stones frontman Mick Jagger (pictured in 2014) teamed up with David Bowie for a cover version of Martha and the Vandellas' "Dancing in the Street", which topped the chart in September 1985 for four weeks.

The UK Singles Chart is one of many music charts compiled by the Official Charts Company that calculates the best-selling singles of the week in the United Kingdom. Before 2004, the chart was only based on the sales of physical singles. This list shows singles that peaked in the Top 10 of the UK Singles Chart during 1985, as well as singles which peaked in 1984 and 1986 but were in the top 10 in 1985. The entry date is when the single appeared in the top 10 for the first time (week ending, as published by the Official Charts Company, which is six days after the chart is announced).

One-hundred and twenty-three singles were in the top ten in 1985. Nine singles from 1984 remained in the top 10 for several weeks at the beginning of the year, while "West End Girls" by Pet Shop Boys was released in 1985 but did not reach its peak until 1986. "Like a Virgin" by Madonna and "Shout" by Tears for Fears were the singles from 1984 to reach their peak in 1985. "Last Christmas" by Wham! and "Do They Know It's Christmas?" by Band Aid both re-entered the top ten at the end of the year after being re-issued. Thirty-five artists scored multiple entries in the top 10 in 1985. A-ha, Billy Idol, Bruce Springsteen, Simple Minds and Whitney Houston were among the many artists who achieved their first UK charting top 10 single in 1985.

The 1984 Christmas number-one, charity single "Do They Know It's Christmas?" by the collective Band Aid, remained at number-one for the first two weeks of 1985. The first new number-one single of the year was "I Want to Know What Love Is" by Foreigner. Overall, twenty different singles peaked at number-one in 1985, with David Bowie, George Michael, Holly Johnson and Phil Collins (2, including their appearances on the Band Aid single) having the joint most singles hit that position.

== Background ==
=== Multiple entries ===
One-hundred and twenty-three singles charted in the top 10 in 1985, with one-hundred and eighteen singles reaching their peak this year.

Thirty-five artists scored multiple entries in the top 10 in 1985. Madonna secured the record for most top 10 hits in 1985 with eight hit singles.

Eurythmics were one of a number of artists with two top-ten entries, including the number-one single "There Must Be an Angel (Playing with My Heart)". Billy Idol, Frankie Goes to Hollywood, Marillion, Prince and Tears for Fears were among the other artists who had multiple top 10 entries in 1985.

=== Chart debuts ===
Ninety-two artists achieved their first top 10 single in 1985, either as a lead or featured artist. Of these, five went on to record another top 10 single that year: Billy Idol, Jaki Graham, King, Mai Tai and Marillion. Bruce Springsteen had three other entries in this year.

The following table (collapsed on desktop site) does not include acts who had previously charted as part of a group and secured their first top 10 solo single.

Artist	Number of top 10s	First entry	Chart position	Other entries
Strawberry Switchblade	1	"Since Yesterday"	5	—
King	2	"Love & Pride"	2	"Alone Without You" (8)
Russ Abbot	1	"Atmosphere"	7	—
Ashford & Simpson	1	"Solid"	3	—
Bruce Springsteen	4	"Dancing in the Dark"	4	"We Are the World" (1), "I'm on Fire"/"Born in the U.S.A." (5), "Santa Claus Is Comin' to Town"/"My Hometown" (9)
Art of Noise	1	"Close (to the Edit)"	8	—
Kirsty MacColl	1	"A New England"	7	—
Dead or Alive	1	"You Spin Me Round (Like a Record)"	1	—
Stephen "Tin Tin" Duffy	1	"Kiss Me"	4	—
Philip Bailey	1	"Easy Lover"	1	—
Go West	1	"We Close Our Eyes"	5	—
Paul Miles-Kingston	1	"Pie Jesu"	3	—
USA for Africa	1	"We Are the World"	1	—
Al Jarreau	1	"We Are the World"	1	—
Bette Midler	1	"We Are the World"	1	—
Bill Gibson	1	"We Are the World"	1	—
Chris Hayes	1	"We Are the World"	1	—
Dan Aykroyd	1	"We Are the World"	1	—
Huey Lewis	1	"We Are the World"	1	—
James Ingram	1	"We Are the World"	1	—
Jeffrey Osborne	1	"We Are the World"	1	—
Johnny Colla	1	"We Are the World"	1	—
Mario Cipollina	1	"We Are the World"	1	—
Sean Hopper	1	"We Are the World"	1	—
Sheila E.	1	"We Are the World"	1	—
Steve Perry	1	"We Are the World"	1	—
Waylon Jennings	1	"We Are the World"	1	—
Willie Nelson	1	"We Are the World"	1	—
Phyllis Nelson	1	"Move Closer"	1	—
Jaki Graham	2	"Could It Be I'm Falling In Love"	5	"Round and Around" (9)
Simple Minds	1	"Don't You (Forget About Me)"	7	—
Paul Hardcastle	1	"19"	1	—
DeBarge	1	"Rhythm of the Night"	4	—
Steve Arrington	1	"Feel So Real"	5	—
Jimmy Nail	1	"Love Don't Live Here Anymore"	3	—
Marillion	2	"Kayleigh"	2	"Lavender" (5)
Katrina and the Waves	1	"Walking on Sunshine"	8	—
The Crowd	1	"You'll Never Walk Alone"	1	—
Bernie Winters	1	"You'll Never Walk Alone"	1	—
Bruce Forsyth	1	"You'll Never Walk Alone"	1	—
Chris Robinson	1	"You'll Never Walk Alone"	1	—
Colin Blunstone	1	"You'll Never Walk Alone"	1	—
Dave Lee Travis	1	"You'll Never Walk Alone"	1	—
David Shilling	1	"You'll Never Walk Alone"	1	—
Ed Stewart	1	"You'll Never Walk Alone"	1	—
Eddie Hardin	1	"You'll Never Walk Alone"	1	—
The Foxes	1	"You'll Never Walk Alone"	1	—
Gary Holton	1	"You'll Never Walk Alone"	1	—
Gerard Kenny	1	"You'll Never Walk Alone"	1	—
Graham Dene	1	"You'll Never Walk Alone"	1	—
Hank Hancocks	1	"You'll Never Walk Alone"	1	—
Jess Conrad	1	"You'll Never Walk Alone"	1	—
John Conteh	1	"You'll Never Walk Alone"	1	—
John Otway	1	"You'll Never Walk Alone"	1	—
John Verity	1	"You'll Never Walk Alone"	1	—
Karen Clark	1	"You'll Never Walk Alone"	1	—
Keith Chegwin	1	"You'll Never Walk Alone"	1	—
Kin Kelly	1	"You'll Never Walk Alone"	1	—
Nigel Holton	1	"You'll Never Walk Alone"	1	—
Pete Spencer	1	"You'll Never Walk Alone"	1	—
Peter Cook	1	"You'll Never Walk Alone"	1	—
Robert Heaton	1	"You'll Never Walk Alone"	1	—
Rose-Marie	1	"You'll Never Walk Alone"	1	—
Tim Healy	1	"You'll Never Walk Alone"	1	—
Tim Hinkley	1	"You'll Never Walk Alone"	1	—
Zak Starkey	1	"You'll Never Walk Alone"	1	—
Animotion	1	"Obsession"	5	—
Mai Tai	2	"History"	8	"Body and Soul" (9)
Harold Faltermeyer	1	"Axel F"	2	—
Denise LaSalle	1	"My Toot Toot"	6	—
Fine Young Cannibals	1	"Johnny Come Home"	8	—
Opus	1	"Live Is Life"	6	—
Trans-X	1	"Living on Video"	9	—
Billy Idol	2	"White Wedding"	6	"Rebel Yell" (6)
Princess	1	"Say I'm Your Number One"	7	—
Baltimora	1	"Tarzan Boy"	3	—
Red Box	1	"Lean on Me (Ah-Li-Ayo)"	3	—
Jennifer Rush	1	"The Power of Love"	1	—
Colonel Abrams	1	"Trapped"	3	—
John Parr	1	"St. Elmo's Fire (Man in Motion)"	6	—
A-ha	1	"Take On Me"	2	—
Jan Hammer	1	"Miami Vice Theme"	5	—
Arcadia	1	"Election Day"	7	—
Feargal Sharkey	1	"A Good Heart"	1	—
Far Corporation	1	"Stairway to Heaven"	8	—
Talking Heads	1	"Road to Nowhere"	6	—
Dee C Lee	1	"See the Day"	3	—
Doug E. Fresh and The Get Fresh Crew	1	"The Show"	7	—
Whitney Houston	1	"Saving All My Love for You"	1	—
Marilyn Martin	1	"Separate Lives"	4	—
Pet Shop Boys	1	"West End Girls" ^{[A]}	1	—
Aled Jones	1	"Walking in the Air"	5	—

Notes

Stephen Duffy was a drummer in Duran Duran, leaving before they made their top 10 debut. His solo single "Kiss Me" was originally recorded by his band Tin Tin, reaching number 78 in 1984, and was re-released the following year, peaking at number 4. Earth, Wind & Fire's Philip Bailey recorded the duet "Easy Lover" with Phil Collins. The group's four top 10 singles – "September" (3), "Boogie Wonderland" (4), "After the Love Has Gone" (4) and "Let's Groove" (3) – were all achieved prior to 1985.

USA for Africa featured many artists who had previously charted in their own right, including Billy Joel, Bob Dylan, Cyndi Lauper, Daryl Hall, Diana Ross, Dionne Warwick, Harry Belafonte, John Oates, Kenny Loggins, Kenny Rogers, Kim Carnes, Lionel Richie, Michael Jackson, Paul Simon, The Pointer Sisters, Ray Charles, Smokey Robinson, Stevie Wonder and Tina Turner. Other singers had also had top 10 entries before but only as part of a group. This included Bob Geldof (The Boomtown Rats plus Band Aid), Lindsey Buckingham (Fleetwood Mac), Jackie Jackson, La Toya Jackson, Marlon Jackson, Randy Jackson & Tito Jackson (all The Jackson 5). Quincy Jones served as conductor, while David Paich, Greg Phillinganes, John Robinson, Louis Johnson, Michael Boddicker, Michael Omartian, Paulinho Da Costa and Phil Collins were instrumentalists – only Collins had a previous top 10 hit to his name as a singer.

Marc Almond formed the duo Soft Cell with Dave Ball, scoring their signature number-one hit "Tainted Love" in 1981. He landed his first solo top 10 in 1985, "I Feel Love (Medley)" alongside Bronski Beat. Phil Lynott's only top 10 single outside Thin Lizzy came in 1985, a duet with Gary Moore called "Out in the Fields", making number five.

The Crowd was another charity collective who united to raise money in aid of the Bradford City stadium fire. Acts who had formerly reached the top ten included The Barron Knights, Black Lace, Girlschool, Jim Diamond, Joe Fagin, Johnny Logan, Kenny Lynch, Kiki Dee, Motörhead, The Nolans, Paul McCartney, Rolf Harris, Smokie and Tony Christie. Additionally, the singers who had charted with groups previously were Denny Laine (The Moody Blues), Rick Wakeman (Yes), Graham Gouldman (10cc), Rick Wild (The Overlanders), Tony Hicks (The Hollies), John Entwistle (The Who), Chris Norman (Smokie) and Frank Allen (The Searchers).

Chrissie Hynde was a founding member of The Pretenders who made their top 10 debut in 1979 with "Brass in Pocket". Her guest appearance on "I Got You Babe" with UB40 was her first top 10 hit away from the band. Arcadia consisted of three members of Duran Duran as a side project – Simon Le Bon, Nick Rhodes and Roger Taylor – while they were on a short hiatus.

=== Songs from films ===
Original songs from various films entered the top 10 throughout the year. These included "Let's Go Crazy" & "Take Me with U" (from Purple Rain), "Don't You (Forget About Me)" (The Breakfast Club), "A View to a Kill" (A View to a Kill), "Crazy for You" & "Gambler" (Vision Quest), "Axel F" (Beverly Hills Cop), "Into the Groove" (Desperately Seeking Susan), "We Don't Need Another Hero (Thunderdome)" (Mad Max Beyond Thunderdome), "Holding Out for a Hero" (Footloose), "St. Elmo's Fire (Man in Motion)" (St. Elmo's Fire), "Say You, Say Me" (White Nights) and "Walking in the Air" (The Snowman).

=== Charity singles ===
A number of songs recorded for charity reached the top 10 in the charts in 1985. The supergroup USA for Africa released "We Are the World" to support famine relief efforts across Africa. The song peaked at number-one for 2 weeks from 20 April 1985.

The Crowd released the anthem "You'll Never Walk Alone" in response to the Bradford fire, a disaster at Bradford City's Valley Parade stadium which claimed the lives of 56 people. It spent two weeks at number-one from 15 June 1985.

"Do They Know It's Christmas?" by Band Aid re-entered the top 10 at the end of 1985, having peaked at number-one for 5 weeks in 1984.

=== Best-selling singles ===
Jennifer Rush had the best-selling single of the year with "The Power of Love". The single spent ten weeks in the top 10 (including five weeks at number one), sold over 1.28 million copies and was certified platinum by the BPI. "I Know Him So Well" by Elaine Paige & Barbara Dickson came in second place, selling more than 823,000 copies and losing out by around 405,000 sales. Madonna's "Into the Groove", "19" from Paul Hardcastle and "Frankie" by Sister Sledge made up the top five. Singles by David Bowie & Mick Jagger, Phyllis Nelson, Feargal Sharkey, a-ha and King were also in the top ten best-selling singles of the year.

== Top-ten singles ==
Symbol	Meaning
‡	Single peaked in 1984 but still in chart in 1985.
♦	Single released in 1985 but peaked in 1986.
(#)	Year-end top-ten single position and rank
Entered	The date that the single first appeared in the chart.
Peak	Highest position that the single reached in the UK Singles Chart.

Entered (week ending)	Weeks in top 10	Single	Artist	Peak	Peak reached (week ending)	Weeks at peak
Singles in 1984
8 September 1984	11	"Ghostbusters" ‡	Ray Parker Jr.	2	22 September 1984	3
1 December 1984	7	"The Power of Love" ‡	Frankie Goes to Hollywood	1	8 December 1984	1
8 December 1984	9	"Like a Virgin"	Madonna	3	12 January 1985	1
8 December 1984	6	"We All Stand Together" ‡	Paul McCartney & The Frog Chorus	3	22 December 1984	3
15 December 1984	11	"Do They Know It's Christmas?" ^{[B]}^{[C]}	Band Aid	1	15 December 1984	5
15 December 1984	7	"Last Christmas"/"Everything She Wants" ‡ ^{[D]}	Wham!	2	15 December 1984	5
22 December 1984	4	"Nellie the Elephant" ‡	Toy Dolls	4	29 December 1984	1
22 December 1984	5	"Everything Must Change" ‡	Paul Young	9	22 December 1984	5
29 December 1984	7	"Shout"	Tears for Fears	4	26 January 1985	1
Singles in 1985
5 January 1985	7	"I Want to Know What Love Is"	Foreigner	1	19 January 1985	3
19 January 1985	10	"I Know Him So Well" (#2)	Elaine Paige & Barbara Dickson	1	9 February 1985	4
19 January 1985	1	"Step Off (Part 1)"	Grandmaster Melle Mel and the Furious Five	8	19 January 1985	1
19 January 1985	4	"Since Yesterday"	Strawberry Switchblade	5	26 January 1985	1
26 January 1985	5	"1999"/"Little Red Corvette"	Prince	2	26 January 1985	1
26 January 1985	7	"Love & Pride" (#10)	King	2	9 February 1985	3
26 January 1985	4	"Atmosphere"	Russ Abbot	7	9 February 1985	1
2 February 1985	6	"Solid"	Ashford & Simpson	3	16 February 1985	2
2 February 1985	6	"Dancing in the Dark"	Bruce Springsteen	4	16 February 1985	2
9 February 1985	4	"Close (to the Edit)"	Art of Noise	8	23 February 1985	1
16 February 1985	4	"Things Can Only Get Better"	Howard Jones	6	23 February 1985	1
16 February 1985	3	"A New England"	Kirsty MacColl	7	23 February 1985	1
23 February 1985	5	"You Spin Me Round (Like a Record)"	Dead or Alive	1	9 March 1985	2
23 February 1985	4	"Nightshift"	Commodores	3	9 March 1985	1
2 March 1985	3	"Let's Go Crazy"/"Take Me With U"	Prince & The Revolution	7	9 March 1985	1
9 March 1985	5	"Kiss Me"	Stephen 'Tin Tin' Duffy	4	9 March 1985	2
9 March 1985	4	"Material Girl"	Madonna	3	16 March 1985	2
16 March 1985	6	"Easy Lover"	Philip Bailey & Phil Collins	1	23 March 1985	4
16 March 1985	2	"The Last Kiss"	David Cassidy	6	16 March 1985	1
16 March 1985	4	"Do What You Do"	Jermaine Jackson	6	30 March 1985	1
16 March 1985	5	"Everytime You Go Away"	Paul Young	4	23 March 1985	2
23 March 1985	4	"That Ole Devil Called Love"	Alison Moyet	2	23 March 1985	2
23 March 1985	6	"We Close Our Eyes"	Go West	5	13 April 1985	1
30 March 1985	4	"Pie Jesu"	Sarah Brightman & Paul Miles-Kingston	3	30 March 1985	2
30 March 1985	4	"Welcome to the Pleasuredome"	Frankie Goes to Hollywood	2	6 April 1985	2
30 March 1985	2	"Wide Boy"	Nik Kershaw	9	6 April 1985	1
6 April 1985	7	"Everybody Wants to Rule the World"	Tears for Fears	2	20 April 1985	2
13 April 1985	5	"We Are the World" ^{[D]}	USA for Africa	1	20 April 1985	2
13 April 1985	8	"Move Closer" (#7)	Phyllis Nelson	1	4 May 1985	1
13 April 1985	4	"Could It Be I'm Falling in Love"	David Grant & Jaki Graham	5	27 April 1985	1
20 April 1985	4	"One More Night"	Phil Collins	4	27 April 1985	1
20 April 1985	3	"Clouds Across the Moon"	RAH Band	6	27 April 1985	1
27 April 1985	6	"I Feel Love (Medley)"	Bronski Beat & Marc Almond	3	11 May 1985	2
27 April 1985	4	"Don't You (Forget About Me)"	Simple Minds	7	4 May 1985	1
27 April 1985	1	"Look Mama"	Howard Jones	10	27 April 1985	1
4 May 1985	7	"19" (#4)	Paul Hardcastle	1	11 May 1985	5
4 May 1985	2	"The Unforgettable Fire"	U2	6	11 May 1985	1
11 May 1985	3	"Feel So Real"	Steve Arrington	5	18 May 1985	1
11 May 1985	4	"Rhythm of the Night"	DeBarge	4	18 May 1985	1
18 May 1985	2	"Walls Come Tumbling Down!"	The Style Council	6	18 May 1985	1
18 May 1985	5	"A View to a Kill"	Duran Duran	2	25 May 1985	3
18 May 1985	4	"Love Don't Live Here Anymore"	Jimmy Nail	3	25 May 1985	2
25 May 1985	7	"Kayleigh"	Marillion	2	15 June 1985	1
25 May 1985	1	"We All Follow Man United"	Manchester United Football Team	10	25 May 1985	1
1 June 1985	3	"Out in the Fields"	Gary Moore & Phil Lynott	5	8 June 1985	1
1 June 1985	2	"Walking on Sunshine"	Katrina and the Waves	8	8 June 1985	1
1 June 1985	1	"Slave to Love"	Bryan Ferry	10	1 June 1985	1
8 June 1985	5	"You'll Never Walk Alone" ^{[E]}	The Crowd	1	15 June 1985	2
8 June 1985	3	"Obsession"	Animotion	5	15 June 1985	1
8 June 1985	5	"Suddenly"	Billy Ocean	4	15 June 1985	1
8 June 1985	4	"The Word Girl"	Scritti Politti	6	22 June 1985	1
15 June 1985	7	"Crazy for You"	Madonna	2	29 June 1985	1
15 June 1985	5	"History"	Mai Tai	8	29 June 1985	1
22 June 1985	8	"Frankie" (#5)	Sister Sledge	1	29 June 1985	4
22 June 1985	8	"Cherish"	Kool & the Gang	4	6 July 1985	3
22 June 1985	7	"Axel F"	Harold Faltermeyer	2	6 July 1985	3
29 June 1985	4	"Ben"	Marti Webb	5	6 July 1985	1
6 July 1985	3	"I'm on Fire"/"Born in the U.S.A."	Bruce Springsteen	5	13 July 1985	1
13 July 1985	3	"My Toot Toot"	Denise LaSalle	6	20 July 1985	1
13 July 1985	2	"Johnny Come Home"	Fine Young Cannibals	8	13 July 1985	1
13 July 1985	7	"There Must Be an Angel (Playing with My Heart)"	Eurythmics	1	27 July 1985	1
20 July 1985	4	"Live Is Life"	Opus	6	3 August 1985	1
27 July 1985	8	"Into the Groove" (#3)	Madonna	1	3 August 1985	4
27 July 1985	2	"Round and Around"	Jaki Graham	9	27 July 1985	1
27 July 1985	2	"Living on Video"	Trans-X	9	3 August 1985	1
3 August 1985	5	"We Don't Need Another Hero (Thunderdome)"	Tina Turner	3	3 August 1985	2
3 August 1985	6	"Money For Nothing"	Dire Straits	4	10 August 1985	1
10 August 1985	4	"Holiday" ^{[F]}	Madonna	2	17 August 1985	1
10 August 1985	3	"White Wedding"	Billy Idol	6	10 August 1985	1
10 August 1985	7	"I Got You Babe"	UB40 with Chrissie Hynde	1	31 August 1985	1
17 August 1985	5	"Drive" ^{[G]}	The Cars	4	31 August 1985	1
17 August 1985	5	"Running Up That Hill"	Kate Bush	3	31 August 1985	1
17 August 1985	1	"Don Quixote"	Nik Kershaw	10	17 August 1985	1
24 August 1985	4	"Say I'm Your Number One"	Princess	7	31 August 1985	2
31 August 1985	5	"Tarzan Boy"	Baltimora	3	7 September 1985	1
31 August 1985	2	"Alone Without You"	King	8	7 September 1985	1
7 September 1985	6	"Dancing in the Street" (#6)	David Bowie & Mick Jagger	1	7 September 1985	4
7 September 1985	6	"Holding Out for a Hero"	Bonnie Tyler	2	14 September 1985	3
14 September 1985	5	"Part-Time Lover"	Stevie Wonder	3	21 September 1985	2
14 September 1985	3	"Body and Soul"	Mai Tai	9	21 September 1985	1
21 September 1985	3	"Lavender"	Marillion	5	21 September 1985	1
21 September 1985	2	"Knock on Wood"/"Light My Fire (Remix)"	Amii Stewart	7	21 September 1985	1
21 September 1985	6	"If I Was"	Midge Ure	1	5 October 1985	1
21 September 1985	4	"Angel"	Madonna	5	28 September 1985	1
28 September 1985	5	"Lean on Me (Ah-Li-Ayo)"	Red Box	3	12 October 1985	1
5 October 1985	10	"The Power of Love" (#1)	Jennifer Rush	1	12 October 1985	5
5 October 1985	3	"Rebel Yell"	Billy Idol	6	12 October 1985	1
5 October 1985	7	"Trapped"	Colonel Abrams	3	19 October 1985	3
12 October 1985	5	"St. Elmo's Fire (Man in Motion)"	John Parr	6	19 October 1985	3
19 October 1985	6	"Take On Me" (#9)	A-ha	2	26 October 1985	3
19 October 1985	4	"Gambler"	Madonna	4	26 October 1985	1
19 October 1985	3	"Alive and Kicking"	Simple Minds	7	26 October 1985	1
19 October 1985	3	"Miami Vice Theme"	Jan Hammer	5	26 October 1985	1
26 October 1985	5	"Nikita"	Elton John	3	9 November 1985	1
2 November 1985	2	"Election Day"	Arcadia	7	2 November 1985	1
2 November 1985	4	"Something About You"	Level 42	6	9 November 1985	2
9 November 1985	6	"A Good Heart" (#8)	Feargal Sharkey	1	16 November 1985	2
9 November 1985	5	"Don't Break My Heart"	UB40	3	23 November 1985	2
16 November 1985	1	"Stairway to Heaven"	Far Corporation	8	16 November 1985	1
16 November 1985	3	"One Vision"	Queen	7	23 November 1985	1
16 November 1985	2	"Sisters Are Doin' It for Themselves"	Eurythmics & Aretha Franklin	9	23 November 1985	1
23 November 1985	8	"I'm Your Man"	Wham!	1	30 November 1985	2
23 November 1985	3	"Road to Nowhere"	Talking Heads	6	30 November 1985	1
30 November 1985	6	"See the Day"	Dee C Lee	3	7 December 1985	2
30 November 1985	2	"The Show"	Doug E. Fresh & The Get Fresh Crew	7	30 November 1985	2
30 November 1985	8	"Saving All My Love for You"	Whitney Houston	1	14 December 1985	2
30 November 1985	6	"Separate Lives"	Phil Collins & Marilyn Martin	4	14 December 1985	1
7 December 1985	2	"Say You, Say Me"	Lionel Richie	8	14 December 1985	1
14 December 1985	5	"Dress You Up"	Madonna	5	14 December 1985	1
14 December 1985	8	"West End Girls" ♦	Pet Shop Boys	1	11 January 1986	2
14 December 1985	5	"Merry Christmas Everyone"	Shakin' Stevens	1	28 December 1985	2
21 December 1985	1	"Santa Claus Is Comin' to Town"/"My Hometown"	Bruce Springsteen	9	21 December 1985	1
21 December 1985	3	"Last Christmas" ^{[H]}	Wham!	6	28 December 1985	2
28 December 1985	3	"Walking in the Air"	Aled Jones	5	28 December 1985	2

== Entries by artist ==
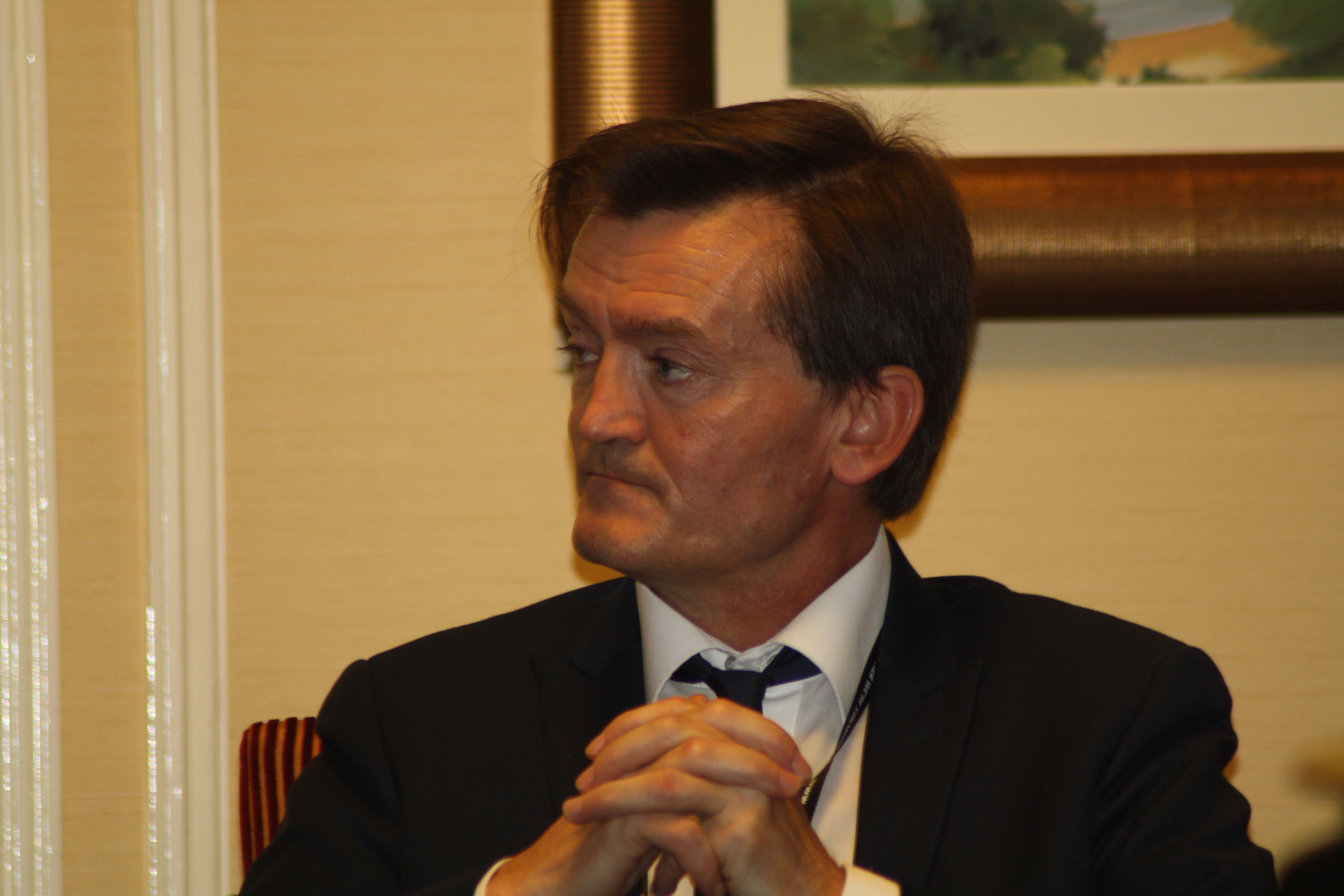
Feargal Sharkey, the former lead singer with Northern Irish punk rock band The Undertones, spent two weeks at number-one in November with "A Good Heart", which became the year's eighth best selling single.

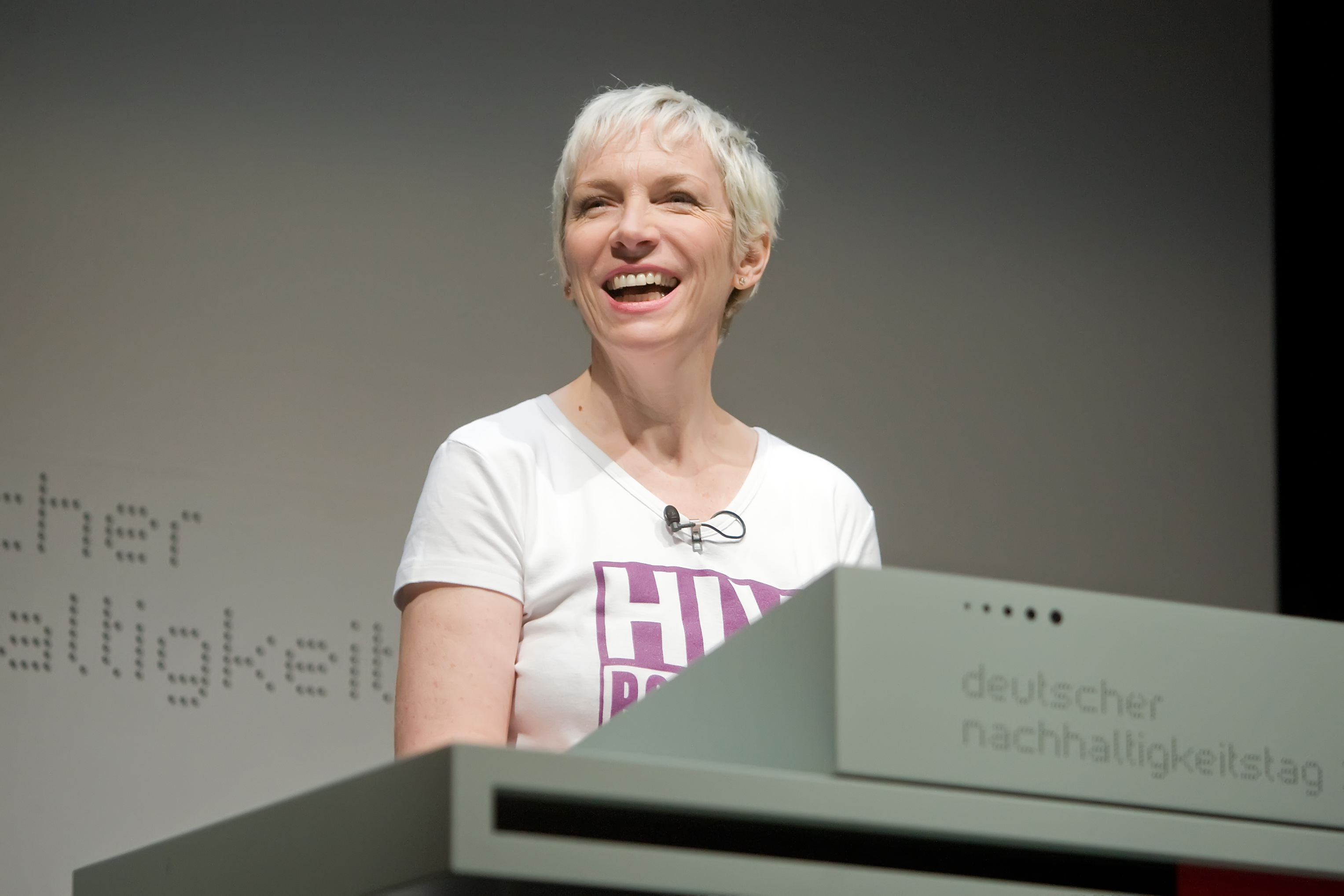
Eurythmics (lead singer Annie Lennox pictured in 2008) had two top 10 hits in 1985, including their only UK number-one single, "There Must Be an Angel (Playing with My Heart)".

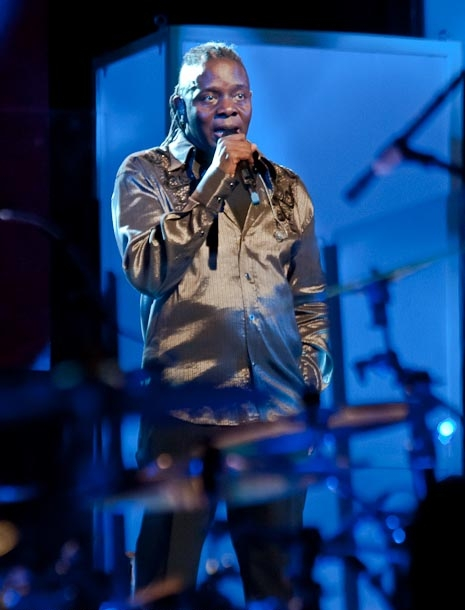
Earth, Wind & Fire vocalist Philip Bailey teamed up with Phil Collins to record "Easy Lover", which spent four weeks at number-one. Bailey had achieved four UK top 10 hits as member of Earth, Wind & Fire, but "Easy Lover" was his only UK top 10 hit independent of the group.

The following table shows artists who achieved two or more top 10 entries in 1985, including singles that reached their peak in 1984. The figures include both main artists and featured artists, while appearances on ensemble charity records are also counted for each artist. The total number of weeks an artist spent in the top ten in 1985 is also shown.

Entries	Artist	Weeks	Singles
8	Madonna ^{[I]}^{[J]}	39	"Angel", "Crazy for You", "Dress You Up", "Gambler", "Holiday", "Into the Groove", "Like a Virgin", "Material Girl"
4	George Michael ^{[K]}^{[L]}^{[N]}	18	"Do They Know It's Christmas?", "I'm Your Man", "Last Christmas"/"Everything She Wants", "Last Christmas"
4	Bruce Springsteen	15	"Dancing in the Dark", "I'm on Fire"/"Born in the U.S.A.", "Santa Claus is Comin' to Town"/"My Hometown", "We Are the World"
4	Phil Collins ^{[K]}^{[L]}	9	"Do They Know It's Christmas?", "Easy Lover", "One More Night", "Separate Lives"
3	Holly Johnson ^{[K]}^{[L]}^{[M]}	13	"Do They Know It's Christmas?", "The Power of Love", "Welcome to the Pleasuredome"
3	Paul McCartney ^{[K]}^{[L]}^{[Q]}^{[R]}	14	"Do They Know It's Christmas?", "We All Stand Together", "You'll Never Walk Alone"
3	Paul Young ^{[K]}^{[L]}	15	"Do They Know It's Christmas?", "Everytime You Go Away", "Everything Must Change"
3	Wham! ^{[L]}	12	"I'm Your Man", "Last Christmas"/"Everything She Wants", "Last Christmas"
2	Adam Clayton ^{[K]}^{[L]}^{[O]}	9	"Do They Know It's Christmas?", "The Unforgettable Fire"
2	Andy Taylor ^{[K]}^{[L]}^{[P]}	12	"A View to a Kill", "Do They Know It's Christmas?"
2	Billy Idol	6	"Rebel Yell", "White Wedding"
2	Bob Geldof ^{[I]}^{[K]}^{[L]}	12	"Do They Know It's Christmas?", "We Are the World"
2	Bono ^{[K]}^{[L]}^{[O]}	9	"Do They Know It's Christmas?", "The Unforgettable Fire"
2	David Bowie ^{[K]}^{[L]}	13	"Dancing in the Street", "Do They Know It's Christmas?"
2	Eurythmics	9	"Sisters Are Doin' It for Themselves", "There Must Be an Angel (Playing with My Heart)"
2	Frankie Goes to Hollywood ^{[L]}	6	"The Power of Love", "Welcome to the Pleasuredome"
2	Howard Jones	5	"Look Mama", "Things Can Only Get Better"
2	Jaki Graham	6	"Could It Be I'm Falling in Love", "Round and Around"
2	John Taylor ^{[K]}^{[L]}^{[P]}	12	"A View to a Kill", "Do They Know It's Christmas?"
2	King	9	"Alone Without You", "Love & Pride"
2	Lionel Richie ^{[I]}	7	"Say You, Say Me", "We Are the World"
2	Mai Tai	8	"Body and Soul", "History"
2	Marillion	10	"Kayleigh", "Lavender"
2	Midge Ure ^{[K]}^{[L]}	13	"Do They Know It's Christmas?", "If I Was"
2	Nick Rhodes ^{[K]}^{[L]}^{[P]}	12	"A View to a Kill", "Do They Know It's Christmas?"
2	Nik Kershaw	3	"Don Quixote", "Wide Boy"
2	Paul Weller ^{[K]}^{[L]}^{[S]}	9	"Do They Know It's Christmas?", "Walls Come Tumbling Down"
2	Prince	8	"1999"/"Little Red Corvette", "Let's Go Crazy"/"Take Me with U"
2	Roger Taylor ^{[K]}^{[L]}^{[P]}	12	"A View to a Kill", "Do They Know It's Christmas?"
2	Simon Le Bon ^{[K]}^{[L]}^{[P]}	12	"A View to a Kill", "Do They Know It's Christmas?"
2	Simple Minds	7	"Alive and Kicking", "Don't You (Forget About Me)"
2	Stevie Wonder ^{[I]}	10	"Part Time Lover", "We Are the World"
2	Tears for Fears ^{[J]}	13	"Everybody Wants to Rule the World", "Shout"
2	Tina Turner ^{[I]}	10	"We Are the World", "We Don't Need Another Hero (Thunderdome)"
2	UB40	12	"Don't Break My Heart", "I Got You Babe"

== Notes ==
- ^{a} "West End Girls" reached its peak of number-one on 11 January 1986 (week ending).
- ^{b} Released as a charity single by Band Aid to aid famine relief in Ethiopia.
- ^{c} "Do They Know It's Christmas" was re-issued in 1985 and re-entered the top 10 at number 6 on 14 December 1985 (week ending), rising to number 3 on 21 December 1985 (week ending).
- ^{d} Released as a charity single by USA for Africa to aid famine relief in Africa, especially Ethiopia. The single featured mainly American artists on vocals and instruments.
- ^{e} Released as a charity single by The Crowd to raise money for families of the Bradford City stadium fire victims.
- ^{f} "Holiday" originally peaked at number 6 on its initial release in 1984.
- ^{g} "Drive" originally peaked at number 5 on its initial release in 1984. After The Cars performed the song at Live Aid in Philadelphia, it re-charted in the UK, reaching a new peak of number 4.
- ^{h} "Last Christmas" was re-issued in 1985 (with "Blue" as the B-side) and re-entered the top 10 at number 10 on 21 December 1985 (week ending), rising to number 6 on 28 December 1985.
- ^{i} Figure includes an appearance on the "We Are the World" charity single by USA for Africa.
- ^{j} Figure includes single that first charted in 1984 but peaked in 1985.
- ^{k} Figure includes an appearance on the "Do They Know It's Christmas?" charity single by Band Aid.
- ^{l} Figure includes single that peaked in 1984.
- ^{m} Figure includes two top 10 hits with the group Wham!.
- ^{n} Figure includes a top 10 hit with the group Frankie Goes to Hollywood.
- ^{o} Figure includes a top 10 hit with the group U2.
- ^{p} Figure includes a top 10 hit with the group Duran Duran.
- ^{q} Paul McCartney contributed a spoken-word section on the B-Side of "You'll Never Walk Alone".
- ^{r} Figure includes an appearance on the "You'll Never Walk Alone" charity single by The Crowd.
- ^{s} Figure includes a top 10 hit with the group The Style Council.

== See also ==
- 1985 in British music
- List of number-one singles from the 1980s (UK)
