= Little Baggariddim =

1985 EP by UB40

EP by UB40
- Released: 22 July 1985
- Genre: Reggae fusion
- Length: 23:00
- Label: A&M
- Producers: UB40; Ray "Pablo" Falconer

UB40 chronology
Geffery Morgan (1984)	Little Baggariddim (1985)	Baggariddim (1985)

Professional ratings
Review scores
Source	Rating
Christgau's Record Guide	A−
Tom Hull	A−

Little Baggariddim is an EP by British reggae band UB40. It was only released in the US and Canada and peaked at number 40 on the Billboard 200 and number 26 on the RPM Top 100 Albums.

== Release and reception ==
Little Baggariddim was released in July 1985 at the beginning of UB40's tour of the US and Canada. The EP comprises six tracks, four of which were released outside of North America in September 1985 on UB40's sixth studio album Baggariddim. It also contains "One in Ten", a reworked, sped-up version of the song originally released in 1981 on UB40's second album Present Arms, as well as a dub version of "I Got You Babe".

Reviewing for Rolling Stone, Rob Tannenbaum wrote that "the whole record coheres brilliantly" and that it "will surely stand as one of 1985's best EPs, and it makes one hungry for a Big Baggariddim". Steve Matteo for Spin highlighted the simplistic packaging and release, praising its affordability, and that "Little Baggariddim is a way for UB40 to stay true to their ideals while hoping for a bit more recognition". Matteo concluded that the songs "show the group's crossing into many different styles of music, though I hope their earliest fans and those who fancy themselves reggae purists won't be put off by their moving in more pop-oriented directions". Billboard wrote that the group "could read a Stateside breakthrough" with "I Got You Babe", and that "both that track and its companions hew to the band's updated but faithful reggae sensibility".

== Track listing ==
Side one
No.	Title	Writer(s)	Length
1.	"I Got You Babe" (with Chrissie Hynde)	Sonny Bono	3:08
2.	"Don't Break My Heart"	UB40; Deborah Banks (Note: The lyrics were originally credited to Javid Khan, but a lawsuit was settled in 1995 instead giving the credit to Deborah Banks.)	3:47
3.	"One in Ten"	UB40	4:19

Side two
No.	Title	Writer(s)	Length
4.	"Mi Spliff"	UB40	3:58
5.	"Hip Hop Lyrical Robot" (with Pato Banton)	UB40; Banton	3:39
6.	"I Got You Babe" (dub version)	Bono	4:09
Total length:			23:00

== Charts ==
Chart (1985)	Peak position
Canada Top Albums/CDs (RPM)	26
US Billboard 200	40
US Cash Box Top 100 Albums	38
