= At This Moment (Tom Jones album) =

Studio album by Tom Jones
- Released: 1989
- Studios: Battery Studios, Air Studios, Soundtrack Studios, Eastbay Studios (London); Gary Chang Studios, Summa Studios, Sound Castle (Los Angeles); The Enterprise (Burbank)
- Label: Jive
- Producers: Art of Noise; Barry Eastmond; Timmy Allen; Peter Collins; Martin Page; Anne Dudley

Tom Jones chronology
The Greatest Hits of Tom Jones (1987)	At This Moment (1989)	Carrying a Torch (1991)

Singles from At This Moment
- 1. "Kiss" Released: 29 October 1988; 2. "Move Closer" Released: 29 April 1989

At This Moment (also released as Move Closer and Kiss) is the 31st studio album by Welsh singer Tom Jones, released in 1989. It includes the single "Kiss", a cover of the Prince song and featuring the Art of Noise, and a cover of Phyllis Nelson's "Move Closer", which was also released as a single.

== Critical reception ==
Professional ratings
Review scores
Source	Rating
AllMusic	3/5 stars
New Musical Express	6/10
Number One	4/5 stars

In a review for AllMusic, Stephen Thomas Erlewine gave the album three out of five stars, describing it as "a collection of state-of-the-art late-'80s dance-pop." He went on to opine that "While the music isn't as ambitious or provocative as [opening track] "Kiss," most of the album was well-produced and well-crafted".

== Track listing ==
No.	Title	Writer(s)	Length
1.	"Kiss"	Prince	3:29
2.	"What You Been Missing"	Jolyon Skinner; Keith Diamond	4:20
3.	"Move Closer"	Phyllis Nelson	4:57
4.	"After the Tears"	Skinner; Jerry Butler	4:18
5.	"Who's Gonna Take You Home Tonight"	Martin Page	4:43
6.	"(I Can't Get No) Satisfaction"	Mick Jagger; Keith Richards	4:25
7.	"I'm Counting On You"	Chris de Burgh	4:40
8.	"At This Moment"	Billy Vera	3:52
9.	"Touch My Heart"	Vincent "Vinx" De'Jon Parrette	6:24
10.	"'Til the End of Time"	Barry Eastmond; Maria Eastmond	4:01

== Personnel ==
- Mike Allaire – engineer (tracks 3, 6–8, 10), mixing (tracks 3, 6)
- Timmy Allen – producer (tracks 3, 6)
- Art of Noise – producer (track 1)
- Carl Beatty – engineer (track 8)
- Peter Collins – producer (tracks 2, 4)
- Anne Dudley – producer (track 9)
- Barry Eastmond – producer (tracks 3, 7, 8, 10)
- Brad Gilderman – engineer (track 6)
- Nigel Green – mixing (tracks 2, 4, 7, 8, 10)
- Tom Hayton – engineer (track 1), mixing (track 1)
- Bryan 'Chuck' New – engineer (track 9), mixing (track 9)
- Martin Page – producer (track 5), arranger (track 5)
- Jerry Peal – engineer (tracks 2, 4)
- Jim Scott – engineer (track 5)
- Brian Sperber – engineer (track 6)
- Ed Thacker – mixing (track 5)
- Recorded at Air Studios (track 1), Battery Studios (tracks 2, 4, 9), Soundtrack Studios (tracks 3, 6, 7, 8, 10), Eastbay Studios (tracks 3, 7, 8, 10), London; Gary Chang Studio (track 5), Summa Music Group (track 5), Sound Castle (track 5), Los Angeles; The Enterprise, Burbank

== Charts ==
Chart (1989)	Peak position
Australian Albums (ARIA)	92
Canada Top Albums/CDs (RPM)	78
Finnish Albums (Suomen virallinen lista)	29
Swedish Albums (Sverigetopplistan)	37
UK Albums (Official Charts)	34
