= Fast Boy/Liquid Lips =

2003 single by the Bluetones

Single by the Bluetones

from the album Luxembourg
- B-side: "Beat on the Brat" "Move Closer"
- Released: 21 April 2003
- Studio: Raezor
- Genre: Indie rock
- Length: 2:59 ("Fast Boy"); 3:03 ("Liquid Lips")
- Label: Superior Quality
- Songwriters: Mark Morriss; Adam Devlin; Scott Morriss; Eds Chesters
- Producers: Gordon Mills Jr.; The Bluetones

The Bluetones singles chronology
"After Hours" (2002)	"Fast Boy/Liquid Lips" (2003)	"Never Going Nowhere" (2003)

Cover of second CD.

"Fast Boy/Liquid Lips" are songs by the English indie rock band the Bluetones, issued as a double A-side single. It was released as the first single from their 2003 fourth studio album, Luxembourg, on 21 April 2003 by their sublabel, Superior Quality Recordings. Peaking at number 25 on the UK Singles Chart, both tracks were included on the band's 2006 compilation album, A Rough Outline: The Singles & B-sides 95 - 03.

The single was formatted on limited edition 7-inch vinyl and two CDs with different B-sides. The B-sides were covers of "Beat on the Brat" by Ramones and Phyllis Nelson's "Move Closer".

== Track listing ==
Tracks one and two were written by Mark Morriss, Adam Devlin, Scott Morriss, and Eds Chesters. Track three was written by Joey Ramone. Track four was written by Phyllis Nelson.

CD1

1. "Fast Boy" – 2:59
2. "Liquid Lips" – 3:03
3. "Beat on the Brat" – 2:21

CD2

1. "Fast Boy" – 2:59
2. "Liquid Lips" – 3:03
3. "Move Closer" – 4:29

7"

1. "Fast Boy" – 2:59
2. "Liquid Lips" – 3:03

== Credits and personnel ==
Credits are taken from the two CD single notes.

The Bluetones

- Mark Morriss – vocals
- Adam Devlin – guitar
- Scott Morriss – bass, backing vocals
- Eds Chesters – drums

Additional personnel

- Gordon Mills Jr. – producer, mixer
- The Bluetones – producer, mixer
- Scott Morriss – art

== Charts ==
Chart (2003)	Peak position
UK Indie (Official Charts)	3
UK Singles (Official Charts)	25
