= Baggariddim =

Studio album by UB40
- Released: 2 September 1985
- Studio: The Abattoir, Birmingham
- Genre: Reggae
- Label: DEP International
- Producer: UB40

UB40 chronology
Geffery Morgan (1984)	Baggariddim (1985)	Rat in the Kitchen (1986)

Professional ratings
Review scores
Source	Rating
Allmusic	3/5 stars
Robert Christgau	A−
Rolling Stone	(favorable)

Baggariddim is the sixth album by UB40, released in 1985. Most of the tracks are reworkings of previous UB40 recordings that originally appeared on Labour of Love and Geffery Morgan, here showcasing guest singers and "toasters" on vocals. Guest artists included Chrissie Hynde, the leader of The Pretenders, and Douglas Gilbert, lead trombonist with the London Symphony Orchestra (LSO). In the UK, Germany, the Netherlands and Belgium, this album was released in a gatefold sleeve containing an additional 3-track 12" EP. The album features two hits, "I Got You Babe"—a duet with Hynde that reached number one in the UK, Ireland and Australia—and the UK number-three follow-up "Don't Break My Heart", which was the 'B-side' of "I Got You Babe" ("Theme from Labour of Love") with vocals added. The album was not released in the US or Canada, where instead an EP entitled Little Baggariddim was released.

== Track listing ==
1. "The King Step Mk.1" (feat. Pato Banton over "If It Happens Again") – 3:32
2. "The Buzz Feeling" (feat. Gunslinger over "Cherry Oh Baby") – 3:41
3. "Lyric Officer Mk.2" (feat. Dillinger over "If It Happens Again") – 3:16
4. "Demonstrate" (feat. Admiral Jerry over "As Always You Were Wrong Again") – 3:55
5. "Two in a One Mk.1" (feat. Pablo & Gunslinger over "The Pillow") – 3:18
6. "Hold Your Position Mk.3" (feat. Stones over "If It Happens Again") – 3:56
7. "Hip Hop Lyrical Robot" (feat. Pato Banton over "Your Eyes Were Open") – 4:22
8. "Style Mk.4" (feat. Pablo over "If It Happens Again") – 4:02
9. "Fight Fe Come in Mk.2" (feat. James Bon & General CP over "The Pillow") – 3:25
10. "V's Version" (feat. Sister V over "Version Girl") – 3:25
11. "Don't Break My Heart" – 3:49 U.K Single.
12. "I Got You Babe" (with Chrissie Hynde) (Sonny & Cher Cover) – 3:09
13. "Mi Spliff" – 4:01

"The King Step Mk.1"
The King Step Mk.1 audio sample

== Personnel ==
Technical personnel

- Howard Gray – engineer
- Nick Phipps – tape op
- Dave Dragon – cover illustration

== Bigga Baggariddim ==
In 2021, UB40 released Bigga Baggariddim, their 20th album, which features collaborations with artists from the original Baggariddim and newer reggae artists. Songs on the new album include "Good Vibes Tonight" and "Message Of Love", while guests include Tippa Irie, KIOKO, House of Shem and Inner Circle.
