= The Crowd (band) =

- Origin: England
- Genres: Charity
- Years active: 1985

The Crowd was a charity supergroup formed specifically to produce a charity record for the Bradford City stadium fire, in which 56 people died on 11 May 1985. The group consisted of singers, actors, television personalities and others.

Gerry Marsden of Gerry and the Pacemakers had decided to make a charity record to aid the families of the victims of the disaster (the Bradford City Disaster Fund). The re-recording of the 1963 number 1 hit song "You'll Never Walk Alone" from the Broadway musical Carousel, also a 'football anthem' for Liverpool supporters, entered the UK Singles Chart at number 52, moving to number 4 the following week and then reaching number one on 15 June 1985. The record also topped the Irish Singles Chart. The single gave Gerry Marsden a 'first' in British recording history, by becoming the first person to top the UK chart with two versions of the same song.

== Contributing musicians and celebrities ==
The band and celebrity members included: Bruce Forsyth, Denny Laine, Jim Diamond, Tony Christie, Rick Wakeman, John Conteh, The Barron Knights, Jess Conrad, Kiki Dee, the Foxes, Rolf Harris, Graham Gouldman, Kenny Lynch, Rick Wild of The Overlanders, Keith Chegwin, Tony Hicks, Colin Blunstone, Tim Hinkley, Johnny Logan, Zak Starkey, Girlschool, Black Lace, John Otway, Gary Holton, Peter Cook, the Nolans, John Entwistle of The Who, Motörhead, Dave Lee Travis, Graham Dene, Ed Stewart, Phil Lynott, Smokie, Joe Fagin, Eddie Hardin, Gerard Kenny, Tim Healy, John Verity, Rose Marie, David Shilling, Chris Norman, Bernie Winters, Robert Heaton, and Frank Allen of The Searchers.

Paul McCartney contributed some words on the B-side of the record which was titled "Messages".

== See also ==
- Bradford City A.F.C.
