= I Like You (Phyllis Nelson song) =

Single by Phyllis Nelson
- B-side: "Reachin'"
- Released: 1985
- Recorded: 1984
- Genre: R&B, dance
- Length: 3:43
- Label: Carrere Records
- Songwriter: Phyllis Nelson

Phyllis Nelson singles chronology
"I Don't Know" (1985)	"I Like You" (1985)

"I Like You" is a song by Phyllis Nelson. In the United States it peaked at number-one on the Dance Club Songs chart. It is her only song to chart on the Hot R&B Singles and Billboard Hot 100 charts.

== Chart positions ==
Weekly chart performance of "I Like You"
Chart (1985–1986)	Peak position
US Billboard Hot 100	61
US Billboard Hot Black Singles	65
US Billboard Hot Dance Club Play	1
US Billboard Dance Singles Sales	1
