= Steps in Time =

Studio album by King
- Released: 5 November 1984
- Studio: Parkgate Studios (Catsfield); The Manor (Shipton-on-Cherwell); Trident One (Soho, London)
- Genre: New wave
- Length: 37:25 (LP)
- Label: CBS
- Producer: Richard James Burgess; Liam Henshall

King chronology
Steps in Time (1984)	Bitter Sweet (1985)

Singles from Steps in Time
- 1. "Love & Pride" Released: 1984; 2. "Soul On My Boots" Released: 1984; 3. "Won't You Hold My Hand Now" Released: 1984

Professional ratings
Review scores
Source	Rating
AllMusic	4/5 stars

Steps in Time is the debut studio album by the English new wave band King, released in November 1984 by CBS Records. The album peaked at No. 6 on the UK Albums Chart and was certified Gold by the BPI.

The album included three singles. "Love & Pride", "Soul On My Boots" and "Won't You Hold My Hand Now" were all released in 1984 but were initially unsuccessful. "Love and Pride" was then re-released in January 1985, this time becoming a hit and peaking at No. 2 in the UK Singles Chart. "Won't You Hold My Hand Now", was re-released in March 1985 and peaked at No. 24. A live videoclip was also released for the track "Trouble", and aired on MTV, though the song was never released as a single.

The cassette edition of the album was soon re-released with eight bonus tracks, including B-sides, previously unreleased songs and remixes.

The first CD edition was not released until 1993 and featured no bonus tracks but did, perhaps unintentionally, include the single remix of Won't You Hold My Hand Now instead of the standard album version.

The album was reissued on CD in 1994 by American company Oglio Records with 8 bonus tracks. A second reissue was released in the UK in 2010 by Cherry Red Records with 7 bonus tracks.

== Track listing ==
=== LP ===
Side one

1. "Fish" – 5:10 (P. King)
2. "Love & Pride" – 3:20 (P. King, M. Roberts)
3. "And As for Myself" – 3:22 (P. King, P. Haines)
4. "Trouble" – 4:02 (P. King)
5. "Won't You Hold My Hand Now" – 3:02 (P. King, M. Roberts, J. Lantsbery, T. Wall)

Side two

6. "Unity Song" – 4:06 (P. King)
7. "Cherry" – 4:15 (P. King, P. Haines, M. Roberts, J. Lantsbery, T. Wall)
8. "Soul On My Boots" – 3:35 (P. King)
9. "I Kissed the Spikey Fridge" – 4:05 (P. King)
10. "Fish (Reprise)" – 2:28 (P. King)

=== MC/CD ===
1. "Fish"
2. "Love & Pride"
3. "And As for Myself"
4. "Trouble"
5. "Won't You Hold My Hand Now"
6. "Don't Stop"
7. "Soul on My Boots (Rub-a-Dub Mix)"
8. "Endlessly"
9. "Fools"
10. "Unity Song"
11. "Cherry"
12. "Soul on My Boots"
13. "I Kissed the Spikey Fridge"
14. "Fish (Reprise)"
15. "Ain't No Doubt"
16. "Love & Pride (Body & Soul Mix)"
17. "Won't You Hold My Hand Now (Heavy Times Mix)"
18. "Classic Strangers"

== Personnel ==
Credits are adapted from the Steps in Time liner notes.

King

- Paul King – vocals
- Mick Roberts – keyboards
- Anthony "Tony" Wall – bass guitar
- Jim "Jackal" Lantsbery – guitar

Additional musicians and production

- Richard James Burgess – producer, drums
- Phill Brown – engineer, mixing
- Liam Henshall – producer (track 5)
- Andy Jackson – engineer
- Flood – engineer
- Dave Bascombe – engineer (track 5)
- Aaron – recording
- Perry Haines – management
- Assorted iMaGes – sleeve design
- Sheila Rock – photography
- Clare Muller – photography
- James Palmer – photography

== Release history ==
Country	Date	Label	Format	Catalogue
UK	1984	CBS	LP	CBS26095
UK	1984	CBS	MC	40-26095
UK	1993	CBS	CD	982 972 2
