= The Bluetones (album) =

2006 album by the Bluetones

Studio album by the Bluetones
- Released: 9 October 2006
- Recorded: 2006
- Studios: Chapel (Lincolnshire, England)
- Genres: Indie rock; alternative rock; post-Britpop
- Length: 36:08
- Label: Cooking Vinyl
- Producer: Hugh Jones

The Bluetones chronology
Luxembourg (2003)	The Bluetones (2006)	A New Athens (2010)

Singles from The Bluetones
- 1. "My Neighbour's House" Released: 19 September 2006; 2. "Head on a Spike" Released: 4 December 2006; 3. "Surrendered" Released: 26 February 2007

Professional ratings
Review scores
Source	Rating
AllMusic	4/5 stars
Drowned in Sound	5/10 stars
Glamour	4/5 stars
heat	5/5 stars
PopMatters	7/10 stars
Q	3/5 stars
SoundsXP	(Very positive)

The Bluetones is the fifth studio album by the English indie rock band the Bluetones, released on 9 October 2006 by Cooking Vinyl. It was produced and mixed by Hugh Jones who also produced their first two albums. Despite positive reviews, the album failed to reach the UK Albums Chart after its first week on release. Its first single "My Neighbour's House" peaked at number 68 on the UK Singles Chart in September 2006. Its other two singles, "Head on a Spike" and "Surrendered", were both released on CD and download in December 2006 and February 2007.

== Background and recording ==
The Bluetones was recorded at Chapel Studios in South Thoresby, Lincolnshire. One of the B-sides to "My Neighbour's House", "South Thoresby", likely got its name from this. It was recorded around the same time as the 2006 FIFA World Cup.

In September 2006, the band's former tour manager robbed them of hundreds of thousands of pounds, facing no issues since he declared himself bankrupt. Because of this, they had to cancel a planned nine-date tour of North America, Japan and Australia, without stating a reason.

The Bluetones frontman Mark Morriss reflected on "Hope and Jump" as one of the best songs he had written. "Fade In/Fade Out" was written in honour of the comedian David Walliams, who was a personal friend of Morriss, who swam the English Channel for Sport Relief in July 2006.

== Track listing ==
All songs were written by Mark Morriss, Eds Chesters, Adam Devlin and Scott Morriss.

No.	Title	Length
1.	"Surrendered"	4:32
2.	"Baby, Back Up"	3:50
3.	"Hope and Jump"	3:30
4.	"Head on a Spike"	3:08
5.	"The King of Outer Space"	3:28
6.	"Thank You, Not Today"	3:30
7.	"My Neighbour's House"	3:34
8.	"Fade In/Fade Out"	3:57
9.	"The Last Song But One"	4:01
10.	"Wasn't I Right About You?"	2:38
Total length:		36:08

== Personnel ==
The Bluetones

- Mark Morriss – vocals
- Adam Devlin – guitar
- Scott Morriss – bass, backing vocals
- Eds Chesters – drums

Additional personnel

- Hugh Jones – producer, mixer
- Will Bartle – engineer
- Caroline Lavelle – cello (tracks 3, 6, 8)
- Pete Baker – trumpet (track 10)
- Scott Morriss – artwork
