= Alone Without You (King song) =

1985 single by the English band King

Single by King

from the album Bitter Sweet
- Released: 1985
- Genre: New wave
- Length: 3:35
- Label: CBS Records
- Songwriter(s): Paul King
- Producer(s): Richard James Burgess

King singles chronology
"Won't You Hold My Hand Now" (1985)	"Alone Without You" (1985)	"The Taste of Your Tears" (1985)

"Alone Without You" is a song by English band King, released as the first single from their second studio album Bitter Sweet.

The single was the second of the band's only two top ten hits, peaking at No. 8 on the UK Singles Chart in August 1985, and remaining there for nine weeks.

The video was filmed in Greece.

== Track listings ==
UK 7" single
A. "Alone Without You" - 3:35
B. "I Kissed the Spikey Fridge" (rock hard mix) - 4:00

UK 12" single
A. "Alone Without You" (Scorcher mix) - 4:30
B1. "Love & Pride" (USA summer mix) - 6:17
B2. "I Kissed the Spikey Fridge" (rock hard mix) - 4:02
