= Bitter Sweet (King album) =

Studio album by King
- Released: 11 November 1985
- Recorded: Park Gate & Wessex Studios
- Genre: New wave
- Length: 39:55 (LP); 45:28 (MC); 77:34 (CD)
- Labels: CBS (LP/MC); Cherry Red (CD)
- Producer: Richard James Burgess

King chronology
Steps in Time (1984)	Bitter Sweet (1985)	Joy (1987)

Bitter Sweet is the second and final album by the English band King, produced by Richard James Burgess and released by CBS Records in 1985. The album peaked at number 16 in the UK Album Chart and was certified Gold by the BPI.

The first single from the album was "Alone Without You" which reached the UK Top 10. Two further singles were taken from the album, "The Taste of Your Tears" (UK #11) and "Torture" (UK #23).

The cassette edition of the record featured a slightly different track listing, containing a slow reprise of the first single "Alone Without You", and the 12" extended remix replacing the 7" version of "The Taste of Your Tears".

The original 1985 CD edition (made in Japan for Europe) also has a different track order and features remixes of the 2 singles "Torture" and "The Taste of Your Tears" instead of the album versions of these songs.

The 1985 CD release in Japan and all digital versions sold online follow the original LP track listing.

In September 2007, the album was remastered and re-released on CD by Cherry Red label with eight bonus tracks including remixes and B-sides.

== Track listing ==
=== LP & Japanese CD ===
1. "Alone Without You" – 3:35 (P. King)
2. "Platform One" – 3:05 (P. King)
3. "I Cringed, I Died, I Felt Hot" – 4:56 (P. King/M. Roberts)
4. "(KFAD) Wait for No-One" – 3:37 (P. King/M. Roberts/J. Lantsbery/A. Wall)
5. "2 M.B." – 3:38 (P. King)
6. "These Things" – 4:34 (P. King/M. Roberts)
7. "The Taste of Your Tears" – 4:03 (P. King)
8. "Torture" – 4:29 (P. King)
9. "Sugar Candy Mountain Buddhas" – 3:51 (P. King/A. Wall/J. Lantsbery)
10. "Mind Yer Toes" – 4:07 (P. King)

=== MC ===
1. "Alone Without You" (3:38)
2. "Platform One" (3:07)
3. "I Cringed, I Died, I Felt Hot" (4:58)
4. "(KFAD) Wait for No-One" (3:39)
5. "2 M.B." (3:50)
6. "Alone Without You – The Reprise" (3:23)
7. "These Things" (4:37)
8. "The Taste of Your Tears (Breaker Heart Mix)" (5:42)
9. "Torture" (4:29)
10. "Sugar Candy Mountain Buddhas" (3:54)
11. "Mind Yer Toes" (4:11)

=== CD 1985 ===
1. "Alone Without You" (3:38)
2. "Platform One" (3:07)
3. "I Cringed, I Died, I Felt Hot" (4:58)
4. "Torture (Passion Fruit Mix)" (6:45)
5. "2 M.B." (3:50)
6. "These Things" (4:37)
7. "The Taste of Your Tears (Breaker Heart Mix)" (5:40)
8. "(KFAD) Wait for No-One" (3:39)
9. "Sugar Candy Mountain Buddhas" (3:54)
10. "Mind Yer Toes" (4:11)

=== CD remaster 2007 ===
1. "Alone Without You" (3:38)
2. "Platform One" (3:07)
3. "I Cringed, I Died, I Felt Hot" (4:58)
4. "(KFAD) Wait for No-One" (3:39)
5. "2 M.B." (3:50)
6. "These Things" (4:37)
7. "The Taste of Your Tears" (4:05)
8. "Torture" (4:29)
9. "Sugar Candy Mountain Buddhas" (3:54)
10. "Mind Yer Toes" (4:11)
11. "Crazy Party" (3:26)
12. "Alone Without You (Scorcher Mix)" (4:30)
13. "The Taste of Your Tears (Breaker Heart CD Mix)" (5:42)
14. "Torture (Passion Fruit Mix)" (6:43)
15. "Love & Pride (USA Summer Mix)" (6:17)
16. "I Kissed the Spikey Fridge (Rock Hard Mix)" (4:02)
17. "These Things (Reprise)" (2:30)
18. "Alone Without You – The Reprise" (3:23)

== Singles ==
- 1985 – "Alone Without You" (UK #8)
- 1985 – "The Taste of Your Tears" (UK #11)
- 1986 – "Torture" (UK #23)

== Personnel ==
- Paul King – vocals
- Mick Roberts – keyboards
- Anthony "Tony" Wall – bass guitar
- Jim "Jackal" Lantsbery – guitar
- Adrian Lillywhite – drums

=== Production and design ===
- Richard James Burgess – producer
- Phill Brown – engineering, mixing
- Perry Haines – photography
- Rob O'Connor – photography
- James Palmer – photography
- Jeff Veitch – photography
- Simon Fowler – sleeve photography
- Rob O'Connor – design

== Release history ==
Country	Date	Label	Format	Catalogue
UK	2007	Cherry Red	CD	CD MRED 328
UK	1985	CBS	CD	CDCBS86320
UK	1985	CBS	MC	40-86320
UK	1985	CBS	LP	86320
