= Luxembourg (album) =

2003 studio album by the Bluetones

Studio album by the Bluetones
- Released: 12 May 2003 (UK)
- Recorded: 2003
- Studios: Raezor (London, England)
- Genre: Indie rock
- Length: 34:15
- Label: Superior Quality
- Producers: The Bluetones; Gordon Mills

The Bluetones chronology
Science & Nature (2000)	Luxembourg (2003)	The Bluetones (2006)

Singles from Luxembourg
- 1. "Fast Boy/Liquid Lips" Released: 21 April 2003; 2. "Never Going Nowhere" Released: 11 August 2003

Professional ratings
Review scores
Source	Rating
Drowned in Sound	1/10 stars
The Guardian	3/5 stars
The Times	4/5 stars
Uncut	1/10 stars
Whisperin & Hollerin	8/10 stars

Luxembourg is the fourth studio album by the English indie rock band the Bluetones. It was released on 12 May 2003 independently by their sublabel Superior Quality Recordings, and was re-issued by Cooking Vinyl on 15 May 2006. Its singles were "Fast Boy/Liquid Lips", issued as a double-A side, peaking at number 25 on the UK Singles Chart, and "Never Going Nowhere", which reached number 40. "I Love The City" was released through download, prior to the album's release. The record itself peaked at number 49 on the UK Albums Chart.

The title of the album refers to its fourth song, "You're No Fun Anymore", about an S&M relationship which has lost its spark. "Luxembourg" is the escape word used.

== Production ==
After getting dropped from their former label Mercury Records, the band continued using their imprint Superior Quality Recordings, although now unsigned. Lead singer Mark Morriss considered it as their "first experience of failure". They decided to take a different approach with Luxembourg, using no acoustic guitars, joking in its CD sleeve notes that "No acoustic instruments were harmed during the making of this album."

== Track listing ==
All tracks were written by Mark Morriss, Adam Devlin, Scott Morriss, and Eds Chesters.

No.	Title	Length
1.	"Here It Comes Again"	4:09
2.	"Fast Boy"	2:57
3.	"Liquid Lips"	3:02
4.	"You're No Fun Anymore"	2:57
5.	"Big Problem"	2:55
6.	"I Love the City"	2:54
7.	"Never Going Nowhere"	4:13
8.	"Little Bear"	3:43
9.	"Code Blue"	3:47
10.	"Turn It Up"	3:38
Total length:		34:15

== Personnel ==
The Bluetones

- Mark Morriss – vocals
- Adam Devlin – guitar
- Scott Morriss – bass, backing vocals
- Eds Chesters – drums

Additional personnel

- Paul Beard – keyboards
- Gordon Mills – producer, mixer, harmonica (track 6)
- The Bluetones – producer, mixer
- Ryan Maunder – assistant producer
- Kevin Metcalfe – mastering
- Neil Burrows – management
- Superior Quality Management – management
- Scott Morriss – artwork
