= Joy (Paul King album) =

Studio album by Paul King
- Released: 1987
- Recorded: Multi Level; Unique Recording Studios; Greene Street Studios, NYC
- Genre: Pop rock
- Length: 43:21
- Label: CBS
- Producer: Dan Hartman

Paul King chronology
| Bitter Sweet (1986) | Joy (1987) | The Best of King - Love & Pride (1998) |

Joy is the only solo album by British singer Paul King, released in 1987, on CBS after King, the band he was lead singer for split up in 1986.

The album was produced by American musician Dan Hartman. It failed to chart, and only produced a minor hit out of two single releases: "I Know", which stalled at number 59, and "Follow My Heart", which failed to chart in the UK top 75.

== Overview ==
The album was more pop rock-oriented than the more new wave-sounding albums by the King group. The album contains extensive use of brass (being especially evident in the first single "I Know"), played by The Uptown Horns quartet, as well as background vocals, recorded in two separate sessions, one held in Detroit and the other in New York. The singer Nona Hendryx features on backing vocals on track "Slow Motion".

The song "Star" was co-written by Paul along with ex colleague Mike Roberts, keyboard player in the King band. Perry Haines' management and The Unity Club fan club were also unchanged.

== Track listing ==
All songs written by Paul King, except where noted.

1. "Follow My Heart" (P. King/D. Hartman) – 4:43
2. "When You Smile" (P. King/D. Hartman/P.Haines) – 4:24
3. "I Know" (P. King/D. Hartman/C. Midnight) – 3:37
4. "Pass on By" – 3:37
5. "Some Risks" – 4:20
6. "One Too Many Heartaches" (P. King/D. Hartman/C. Midnight) – 3:58
7. "Star" (P. King/M. Roberts) – 3:21
8. "It's Up to You" – 3:12
9. "So Brutal" – 5:00
10. "Slow Motion" (P. King/D. Hartman/C. Midnight) – 3:57
11. "Glory's Goal" – 3:12

== Singles ==
- 1987 - "I Know" (UK #59)
- 1987 - "Follow My Heart"

== Personnel ==
- Paul King: vocals, piano and synth
- David Beal: drums
- T. M. Stevens: bass guitar
- Philippe Saisse, Robbie Kilgore: keyboards
- Phil Grande (#2, 3, 6, 7, 10); Carlos Alomar (#1, 6); Graham Simmonds (#5, 8, 9, 10, 11); Steve Conti (#6): guitars
- Mino Cinelu, Linda Curtis: percussion
- Crispin Cioe: alto baritone saxophone
- Bob Funk: trombone
- Arno Hecht: tenor saxophone
- Hollywood Paul Litteral: trumpet
- Nona Hendryx: background vocals #10
- Carolyn Franklin & The Prima Donnas (Brenda Corbett & Margaret Branch): background vocals Detroit sessions
- B.J. Nelson, Maggie Ryder, Kurtis King, Charlie Midnight, Dan Hartman: background vocals New York sessions

Production:

- Dan Hartman: producer, additional guitar and keyboards
- Chris Lord Alge: mixing
- Rod Hui: additional recording
- Bill Smith Studio: sleeve design
- Butch Martin: photography
- Bill Smith: location photography
- Perry Haines for Dolphins Lovers Limited: management
