= My Neighbour's House =

2006 single by the Bluetones

Single by the Bluetones

from the album The Bluetones
- B-side: "Your Psychotic Friend" "South Thoresby" "My Neighbour's Hardcore Belgian House"
- Released: 19 September 2006
- Recorded: 2006
- Studio: Chapel (Lincolnshire, England)
- Genre: Indie rock
- Length: 3:34 (original version); 3:23 (single edit)
- Label: Cooking Vinyl
- Songwriters: Mark Morriss; Adam Devlin; Scott Morriss; Eds Chesters
- Producer: Hugh Jones

The Bluetones singles chronology
"Never Going Nowhere" (2003)	"My Neighbour's House" (2006)	"Head on a Spike" (2006)

"My Neighbour's House" is a song by the English indie rock band the Bluetones, released as the first single from their fifth studio album, The Bluetones, on 19 September 2006 by Cooking Vinyl. It reached number 68 on the UK Singles Chart, and number 2 on the UK Indie Chart.

== Release and promotion ==
Upon its release, the Bluetones performed the single live for The Album Chart Show, which was broadcast on 7 October 2006, two days before the release of their eponymous album.

== Track listings ==
All songs were written by Mark Morriss, Adam Devlin, Scott Morriss, and Eds Chesters.

CD

1. "My Neighbour's House" – 3:23
2. "Your Psychotic Friend" – 4:52
3. "South Thoresby" – 3:42

7"

1. "My Neighbour's House" – 3:23
2. "My Neighbour's Hardcore Belgian House" – 3:54

== Credits and personnel ==
Credits taken from the CD single notes.

The Bluetones

- Mark Morriss – vocals
- Adam Devlin – guitar
- Scott Morriss – bass, backing vocals
- Eds Chesters – drums

Additional personnel

- Hugh Jones – producer, mixer
- Will Bartle – mix engineer
- Dave Blackman – mastering
- Scott Morriss – artwork

== Charts ==
Chart (2006)	Peak position
UK Indie (Official Charts)	2
UK Singles (Official Charts)	68
