= Carrying a Torch (Tom Jones album) =

Studio album by Tom Jones
- Released: 1991
- Label: Dover
- Producer: Van Morrison

Tom Jones chronology
At This Moment (1989)	Carrying a Torch (1991)	The Lead and How to Swing It (1994)

Singles from Carrying a Torch
- 1. "Couldn't Say Goodbye" Released: 26 January 1991; 2. "Carrying a Torch" Released: 16 March 1991

Carrying a Torch is the 32nd studio album by Welsh singer Tom Jones, released in 1991 on Dover Records.

It reached number 44 in the UK Albums Chart.

== Track listing ==
No.	Title	Writer(s)	Length
1.	"Carrying a Torch"	V. Morrison
2.	"Some Peace of Mind"	V. Morrison
3.	"Strange Boat"	Scott, Thislethwaite
4.	"I’m Not Feeling It Anymore"	V. Morrison
5.	"Do I Ever Cross Your Mind"	B. Burnett, M. Smotherman
6.	"Fool for Rock n' Roll"	T. Britten, G. Lyle
7.	"Only in America"	T. Britten, G. Lyle
8.	"Couldn't Say Goodbye"	D Warren, A Hammond
9.	"Killer on the Sheets"	J. Parr
10.	"Give Me a Chance"	P. Carrack
11.	"Zip It Up"	A Hammond, M Vere
12.	"It Must Be You"	V. Morrison
13.	"Old Flame Blue"	J. Carroll
