= Paul King (VJ) =

British-Irish singer (born 1960)

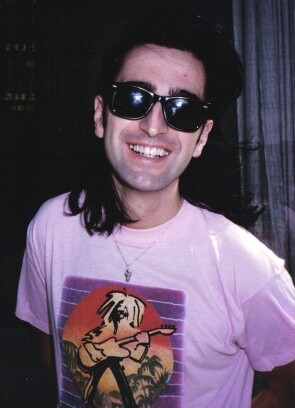
- King in San Francisco, 1986
- Born: Paul King; November 20, 1960 (age 65); Galway, County Galway, Ireland
- Occupations: Singer; musician; TV presenter
- Spouse: Gilly King (m. 2001)

Paul King (born 20 November 1960) is a British-Irish singer, musician, VJ and TV presenter. King was the lead vocalist of the eponymous 1980s new wave band King and has released five albums in his musical career.

== Biography ==
Paul King was born in Galway and moved to the United Kingdom with his parents at a young age, settling in Coventry, England. After graduating from Coventry Drama School, King joined the West Midlands Police Cadets for two years before joining rock-ska band the Reluctant Stereotypes. King's line up of the band – which also contained record producer Paul Sampson – released an album The Label and three singles Confused Action, Plans For Today and Nightmares in the early 1980s on the back of Coventry's vibrant 2 Tone ska scene.

After the demise of the Reluctant Stereotypes, King formed the Raw Screens who perfected their act and style to what King and his manager Perry Haines called 'multi-tone', and then in 1983 relaunched the group as self-named 1980s band King. As lead singer, King was famed for his cockatoo haircut and spray painted Doc Marten's Boots – a look described "like the Child Catcher from Chitty Chitty Bang Bang. But, hell, the girls loved him," while Richard James Burgess produced and drummed on most of the band's songs.

The band lasted just a couple of years, though both of their albums, Steps in Time and Bitter Sweet, went Gold, and they had two Top 10 singles with "Love & Pride" and "Alone Without You". Paul King then went solo with a 1987 album entitled Joy, produced by American musician Dan Hartman. It produced a minor hit single on the UK Singles Chart, "I Know".

After an unsuccessful solo career, King became a VJ on MTV in 1989, before moving over to VH1 in 1994, and then became known for his infomercials on 1980s collection albums. He is mostly remembered for the programmes MTV's Greatest Hits, 120 Minutes and XPO, later renamed First Look. First Look, programmed by Richard Godfrey, Peter Good, Peter Ruppert, showed new singles and album releases and it was presented by VJ Paul King until 30 July 1994. In 1998, a joint King & Paul King 18-track collection, entitled The Best of King – Love & Pride, was eventually released, with hit singles, stand-out tracks, B-sides and remixes. Paul King still works for MTV Networks Europe where he has produced shows for VH1 and MTV.

== Discography ==
=== Albums ===
- 1980 - The Label (Reluctant Stereotypes album)
- Feb 1985 – Steps in Time (King's debut album – UK No. 6)
- Nov 1985 – Bitter Sweet (King's second album – UK No. 16)
- 1987 – Joy (Paul King's solo album)
- 1998 – The Best of King – Love & Pride (King and Paul King's joint collection)

=== Singles ===
Except where otherwise stated, all are releases by the band King.

- 1980 - "Confused Action" (first Reluctant Stereotypes single featuring King)
- 1980 - "Plans for Today" (second Reluctant Stereotypes single featuring King)
- 1980 - "Nightmares" (third Reluctant Stereotypes single featuring King)
- 1984 – "Love & Pride" (UK No. 2)
- July 1984 "Soul On My Boots" (UK No. 158)
- 8 October 1984 – "Won't You Hold My Hand Now" (UK no. 112)
- Jan 1985 – "Love & Pride" (re-release – UK No. 2, US No. 55)
- Mar 1985 – "Won't You Hold My Hand Now" (re-release – UK No. 24)
- Aug 1985 – "Alone Without You" (UK No. 8)
- Oct 1985 – "The Taste of Your Tears" (UK No. 11)
- Jan 1986 – "Torture" (UK No. 23)
- May 1987 – "I Know" (Paul King solo – UK No. 59)
- 1987 – "Follow My Heart" (Paul King solo – UK no,. 126)
