= Never Going Nowhere =

2003 single by the Bluetones

Single by the Bluetones

from the album Luxembourg
- B-side: "Suffer in Silence" "Never Going Nowhere (69 Corp vs. The Bluetones)" "Pram Face" "Choogie Monbassa"
- Released: 11 August 2003
- Studio: Raezor, London, England
- Length: 4:14
- Label: Superior Quality
- Songwriters: Mark Morriss; Adam Devlin; Scott Morriss; Eds Chesters; Richard Payne
- Producers: The Bluetones; Gordon Mills

The Bluetones singles chronology
"Fast Boy/Liquid Lips" (2003)	"Never Going Nowhere" (2003)	"My Neighbour's House" (2006)

"Never Going Nowhere" is a song by the English indie rock band the Bluetones. It was released as the second single from their fourth album, Luxembourg on 11 August 2003, by Superior Quality Recordings. Peaking at number forty on the UK Singles Chart, the single was later listed on the band's 2006 compilation, A Rough Outline: The Singles & B-sides 95 - 03.

A 7" vinyl release for the single was planned without the B-side "Suffer in Silence". Pre-orders were taken but it was never released.

== Track listing ==
All tracks are written by Morriss, Devlin, Morriss, Chesters.

Cover of second CD.

CD1

1. "Never Going Nowhere" – 4:14
2. "Suffer in Silence" – 2:34
3. "Never Going Nowhere (69 Corp vs. The Bluetones)" – 4:40

CD2

1. "Never Going Nowhere" – 4:14
2. "Pram Face" – 3:12
3. "Choogie Monbassa" – 1:57

== Personnel ==
The Bluetones

- Mark Morriss – vocals
- Adam Devlin – guitar
- Scott Morriss – bass guitar, backing vocals
- Eds Chesters – drums

Additional personnel

- Richard Payne – keyboard
- The Bluetones – producer, mixer
- Gordon Mills – producer, mixer
- Scott Morriss – design

== Charts ==
Chart (2003)	Peak position
Scottish Singles Sales (Official Charts)	45
UK Singles (Official Charts)	39
UK Indie (Official Charts)	3
UK Rock & Metal (Official Charts)	4
