= Head on a Spike =

2006 single by the Bluetones

Single by the Bluetones

from the album The Bluetones
- B-side: "Untitled #6" "Surrendered" (acoustic)
- Released: 4 December 2006
- Recorded: 2006
- Studio: Chapel (Lincolnshire, England)
- Genre: Indie rock
- Length: 3:10
- Label: Cooking Vinyl
- Songwriters: Mark Morriss; Eds Chesters; Adam Devlin; Scott Morriss
- Producer: Hugh Jones

The Bluetones singles chronology
"My Neighbour's House" (2006)	"Head on a Spike" (2006)	"Surrendered" (2007)

Music video
- "Head on a Spike" on YouTube

"Head on a Spike" is a song by the English indie rock band the Bluetones, released as the second single from their 2006 fifth studio album, The Bluetones, on 4 December 2006 by Cooking Vinyl. It reached number 136 on the UK Singles Chart. Its music video was directed by their bassist, Scott Morriss, filmed on a cheap digital camera and an early version of IMovie.

== Track listings ==
All songs were written by Mark Morriss, Eds Chesters, Adam Devlin, and Scott Morriss.

CD, regular download

1. "Head on a Spike" – 3:10
2. "Untitled #6" – 2:46
3. "Surrendered" (acoustic) – 4:52

Remix download

1. "Head on a Spike" (Bluetones vs Army of Generals Remix)
2. "Untitled #6" – 2:46
3. "Surrendered" (acoustic) – 4:52

== Credits and personnel ==
Credits are taken from the CD single notes.

The Bluetones

- Mark Morriss – vocals
- Adam Devlin – guitar
- Scott Morriss – bass, backing vocals
- Eds Chesters – drums

Additional personnel

- Hugh Jones – producer, mixer (track 1)
- Gordon Mills Jr. – producer, mixer (tracks 2–3)
- The Bluetones – producer, mixer (track 3)
- Will Bartle – engineer (track 1)

== Charts ==
Chart (2006)	Peak position
UK Physical Singles (Official Charts)	60
UK Independent (Official Charts)	8
UK Singles (Official Charts)	136
