= Mai Tai (band) =

Dutch female musical group

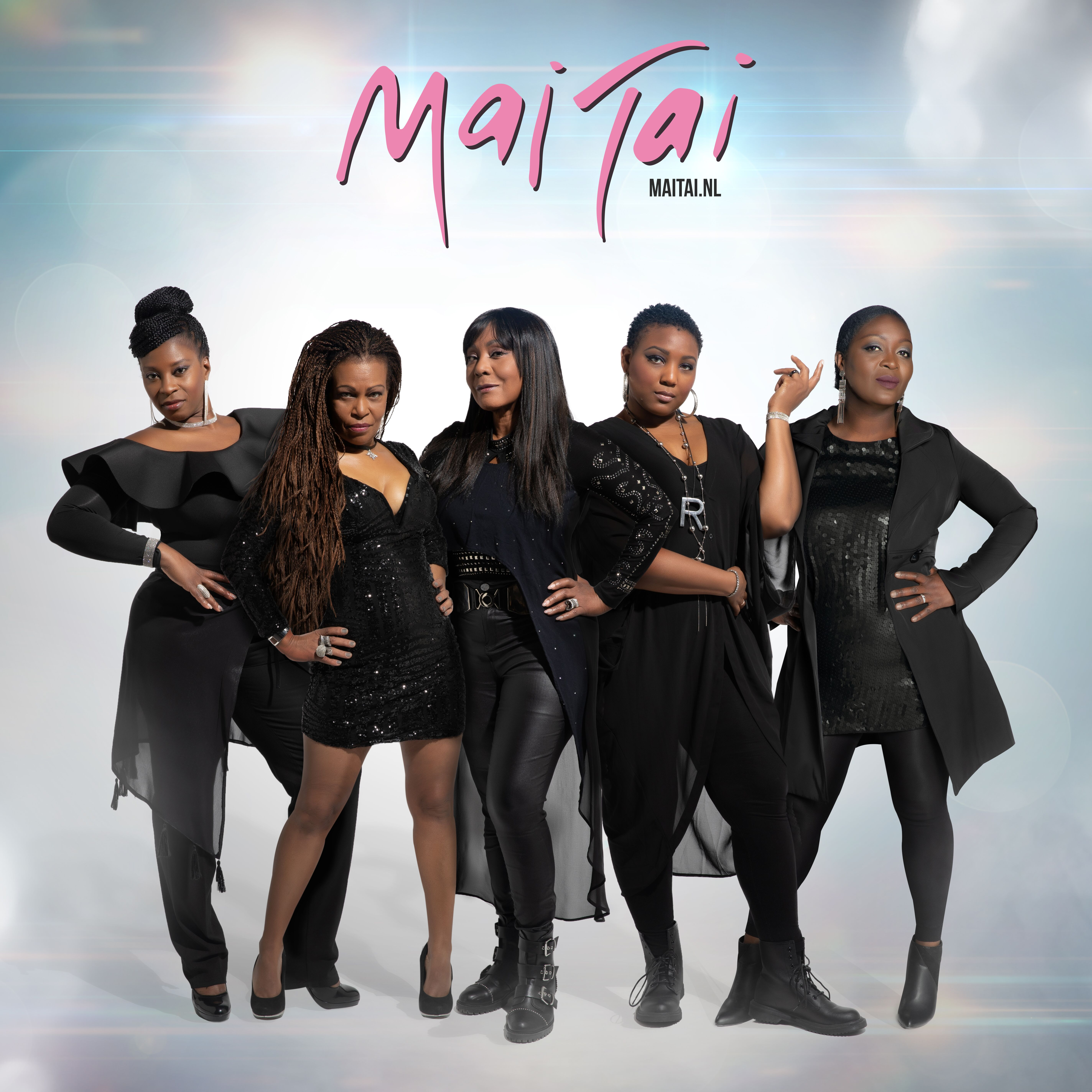

Background information
- Origin: Amsterdam, Netherlands
- Genres: Soul, disco, pop
- Years active: 1983–1988, 1993–1996, 2004–present
- Labels: Injection Disco Dance Label; Haring Records; Critique
- Members: Carolien de Windt; Jetty Weels
- Past members: Maureen Fernandes; Eve L'Kay; Lisa Noya; Marjorie Lammerts; Mildred Douglas

Mai Tai is a Dutch group (named after the tropical cocktail Mai Tai) that was formed in 1983 by the Dutch record producers Eric van Tijn and Jochem Fluitsma with three former backing vocalists Jetty Weels, Mildred Douglas and Caroline de Windt.

== Career ==
=== 1984–1988; classic line-up ===
Their debut single, "Keep on Dancin'" (1983) was only a hit in the Dutch nightclubs. In the summer of 1984, they released a second single, "What Goes On". It became their first hit in the Dutch Top 40, peaking at No. 24. Following up tracks "Body and Soul" and "Am I Losing You Forever" also hit the charts, peaking at No. 23 and 24 in the Netherlands.

In 1984, they released their debut album, which won a Dutch Edison Award and a Silver Harp. Their international breakthrough came with "History" from the debut album. This song was successful all over Europe, and became a No. 8 hit in the UK Singles Chart and reached the top 30 in Germany. It was also a top ten hit in New Zealand and entered the U.S. Billboard dance chart, peaking at No. 3 in 1985.

"Body and Soul" was re-released in the UK in 1985 and became their second UK top 10 hit, peaking at No. 9. "Am I Losing You Forever" was also re-released, but it only peaked at No. 78.

In 1986, their song "Female Intuition" became a top 40 hit in both the Netherlands and Belgium. It would also peak at No. 71 on the Billboard Hot 100 in the United States. The follow-up single, "Turn Your Love Around" from the second album, 1 Touch 2 Much, peaked at No. 12 in the Dutch Top 40. In 1987, Mai Tai released their third album, Cool Is the Rule, with the singles "Bet That's What You Say" and "Fight Fire with Fire", which were only modestly successful. After releasing one last single, "Dance in the Light", and a Best Of compilation in 1988, the group broke up.

Jetty Weels released a few solo singles in 1989 and 1990 under the name Oscare. Mildred Douglas released a solo album, "Face One", in 1990; she went on to collaborate with other artists including her guitarist brother Franky and the supergroup J.A.M. with Angela Groothuizen and Julya Lo'ko.

=== 1993–present; reformations ===
In 1993, Weels and de Windt re-teamed with new member Lisa Noya (niece of the acclaimed percussionist Nippy Noya). Over the next three years they released several moderately successful Eurohouse singles.

From 2001 onwards, Mai Tai occasionally reformed for various performances. Douglas appeared at selected dates and was replaced in 2004 by Marjorie Lammerts (later known as B-Yentl). This line-up participated in the Dutch heat of the Eurovision Song Contest and made it to the semi-finals. Nevertheless, as a result of this exposure they recorded and released several singles, both in English and Dutch, over the next couple of years, as well as the album Onder Voorbehoud in 2007. They also released a new version of the Pointer Sisters' song "Automatic". Despite the success of the singles they split up.

In 2010, Weels re-recorded and released a remix of "Body and Soul" and enlisted two new members, Maureen Pengel and Edna Proctor. They premiered this line-up in 2011 at the Disco legends Festival. The song "History" was featured in the video game Grand Theft Auto IV (2008), on the radio station Vice City FM.

Since the return of singer Carolien De Windt, the group consists of two original singers joined by Eve L'Kay together they released "Baby I Want You Back" and "One Night Man".

== Discography ==
=== Studio albums ===
Year	Album	Peak chart positions	
Year	Album	NL	UK
1984	Mai Tai (issued as History in some countries)	16	91
1986	1 Touch 2 Much	18	—
1987	Cool Is the Rule	—	—
2007	Onder Voorbehoud	—	—
"—" denotes releases that did not chart.

=== Compilation albums ===
- The Best of Mai Tai (1988)
- The Very Best of Mai Tai (1991)

=== Singles ===
Year	Single	Peak chart positions								Certifications
Year	Single	NLD	BEL	GER	NZ	US Pop	US Dance	US R&B	UK	Certifications
1983	"Keep on Dancin'"	―	―	―	―	―	―	―	―	
1984	"Am I Losing You Forever"	24	―	—	―	―	―	―	78	
1984	"What Goes On"	24	―	―	―	―	―	―	―	
1984	"Body and Soul"	23	―	—	29	―	―	―	9	
1985	"History"	9	—	26	9	109	3	37	8	BPI: Silver
1985	"What, Where, When, Who"	―	―	―	―	―	―	69	―	
1986	"1 Touch 2 Much"	45	29	―	―	―	―	―	―	
1986	"Female Intuition"	12	15	―	―	71	―	49	54	
1986	"Turn Your Love Around"	12	17	―	―	―	―	―	―	
1987	"Bet That's What You Say"	26	27	―	―	―	―	―	―	
1987	"Fight Fire with Fire"	30	32	―	―	―	―	―	―	
1988	"Dance in the Light"	88	―	―	―	―	―	―	―	
1993	"Never, Never!"	―	―	―	―	―	―	―	―	
1993	"I Want U"	―	―	―	―	―	―	―	―	
1994	"It's Not Over"	―	―	―	―	―	―	―	―	
1995	"Are You for Real"	―	―	―	―	―	―	―	―	
1995	"History 95" (remix)	―	―	―	―	―	―	―	93	
1996	"Afrodisiac"	―	―	―	―	―	―	―	―	
2004	"Bring Back the Music"	―	―	―	―	―	―	―	―	
2006	"Don't Forget to Live"	―	―	―	―	―	―	―	―	
2006	"Automatic"	―	―	―	―	―	―	―	―	
2007	"Don't Be Afraid"	—	―	―	―	―	―	―	―	
2007	"Bijna"	89	—	—	―	―	―	―	―	
2007	"100% Voce"	24	―	―	―	―	―	―	―	
2008	"Kronenburg Park"	―	―	―	―	―	―	―	―	
2014	"Baby I Want You Back"	―	―	―	―	―	―	―	―	
2015	"One Nite Man"	―	―	―	―	―	―	―	―	
2021	"Bring Back the Music 2021" (Pete Hammond remixes)	―	―	―	―	―	―	―	―	
"—" denotes releases that did not chart or were not released in that territory.
