= Move Closer =

Single by Phyllis Nelson

from the album Move Closer
- B-side: "Somewhere in the City"
- Written: 1984
- Released: 28 January 1985
- Length: 5:54 (album version); 4:35 (single re-recording); 4:01 (radio version)
- Label: Carrere
- Songwriter(s): Phyllis Nelson
- Producer(s): Yves Dessca

Phyllis Nelson singles chronology
"Don't Stop the Train" (1981)	"Move Closer" (1985)	"I Don't Know" (1985)

"Move Closer" is a song by American singer-songwriter Phyllis Nelson that topped the UK Singles Chart in April 1985.

== History ==
Nelson wrote the ballad in 1984. It was a complete departure from the type of music she had been recording; she had been recording dance and disco records, and decided to write her own record because, in her words, "not much music lets you dance close". The lyrics of "Move Closer" were based on a long-term love affair she had with a much younger man in Philadelphia, who was struggling to start his own computer business.

== Chart performance ==
Although "Move Closer" failed to make an impact on the US Billboard Hot 100, the song was hugely successful in the United Kingdom, where it peaked at the top of the UK Singles Chart, making her the first black woman to top the charts in Britain with her own sole composition. The song was originally released in April 1984 but failed to chart, and was re-released in February 1985 after BBC Radio London started to play it. "Move Closer" also benefited from extensive airplay on the hugely successful offshore pirate station, Laser 558. The song began to climb the charts, taking 12 weeks to reach the top spot. "Move Closer" remained on the UK Singles Chart for just over five months during 1985, becoming Britain's seventh biggest-selling song of the year and the 82nd highest-selling single of the decade. In 1994, it was reissued and returned to the UK Singles Chart, this time peaking at number 34, on the back of it being featured in an anti-perspirant television commercial.

== B-side ==
In the UK, on both the 7-inch and 12-inch formats, the B-side is "Somewhere in the City". Both versions contain the "New Mix" of "Move Closer" as an A-side, with the 7-inch version being an edit.

== Charts ==
=== Weekly charts ===
Chart (1985)	Peak position
Australia (Kent Music Report)	15
Belgium (Ultratop 50 Flanders)	34
Europe (European Hot 100 Singles)	42
Ireland (IRMA)	2
New Zealand (Recorded Music NZ)	23
Netherlands (Single Top 100)	47
UK Singles (OCC)	1

=== Year-end charts ===
Chart (1985)	Position
Australia (Kent Music Report)	55
UK Singles (OCC)	7

== Covers ==
- Marilyn Martin, on her eponymous debut album.
- The Bluetones, as a B-side to the single "Fast Boy/Liquid Lips". It was also included on the band's 2006 compilation album, A Rough Outline: The Singles & B-sides 95 - 03.
- Tom Jones, (1989, No. 49 on the UK Singles Chart) on his album At This Moment.
- Sammi Cheng, Cantonese version (titled "纏綿"), released in 1997.
- Hinda Hicks, on her debut album Hinda (1998).
- Upfront, 1990, Trio featuring Keith & Ronnie Lewis with lead singer Rachel
