= King (new wave band) =

English new wave band (formed 1984)

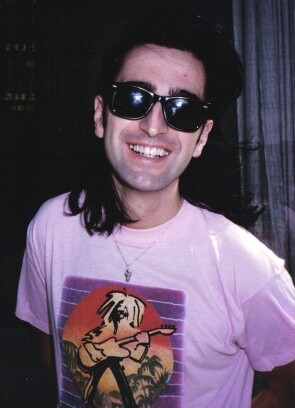
- Paul King of the UK band King

Background information
- Origin: Coventry, England
- Genre: New wave
- Years active: 1983–1986
- Label: CBS
- Past members: Paul King; Mick Roberts; Anthony "Tony" Wall; Jim "Jackal" Lantsbery; John Hewitt; Adrian Lillywhite; Colin Heanes

King were an English new wave band which formed in 1983. The band achieved chart success in 1984, and are best known for their hit single "Love & Pride", which reached No. 2 on the UK singles chart. The band had two top 20 albums (both certified gold) and five top 30 singles in the space of a year.

== Overview ==
The band was formed from the remnants of Coventry rock-ska band the Reluctant Stereotypes, along with producer Paul Sampson. After the Reluctant Stereotypes, singer Paul King formed the Raw Screens, who perfected their act and style to what Paul King and his manager Perry Haines called "Multi Tone", a reference to "Two Tone", and then, in 1983, relaunched the group as band King from the surname of lead singer Paul King. The band toured as a support act for Wah!, JoBoxers and Everything but the Girl and received airplay for their early tracks on BBC radio.

As lead singer, Paul King wore a mullet haircut and spray-painted Doc Marten's Boots which led to the band gaining a skinhead following that was later replaced by a teenage following. The band went through a succession of drummers while recording their debut album. The first three singles from this were largely ignored and failed to make the top 75 of the UK singles chart. The band's fortunes changed in late 1984 after an appearance on The Tube and a tour in support of Culture Club. This led to the successful re-release of the band's early singles.

The band released two UK top 20 albums on CBS, both produced and mixed by Richard James Burgess, who also played drums on most of the debut album Steps in Time (the second LP, Bitter Sweet, saw Adrian Lillywhite on drums). Both albums were certified gold and produced five hit singles, the most successful being the UK No. 2 hit, "Love & Pride". "Love & Pride" was King's only single to chart on the US Billboard Hot 100 which peaked at No. 55 in September 1985.

Despite a year of success, the band split up in 1986 after a tour of Japan. In 1987, Paul King released a solo album entitled Joy, produced by American producer Dan Hartman. After that, he briefly worked as a VJ for MTV.

In 1998, a compilation album was released, entitled The Best of King – Love & Pride, with 18 tracks, featuring the band's greatest hits and stand-out tracks, including Paul King's one minor solo hit, "I Know".

Cherry Red Records released a remastered version of Bitter Sweet in 2007 followed by a remaster of Steps in Time in 2010 and in 2018, another King compilation entitled Remixes & Rarities was released, which contained rare tracks not found on the reissues.

== Line-up ==
- Paul King – vocals, piano
- Mick Roberts – keyboards, synthesizers, piano, backing vocals
- Anthony "Tony" Wall – bass guitar
- Jim "Jackal" Lantsbery – guitar, backing vocals
- John Hewitt – drums
- Adrian Lillywhite – drums
- Colin Heanes – drums

== Discography ==
=== Albums ===
==== Studio albums ====
Title	Album details	Peak chart positions					Certifications
Title	Album details	UK	GER	ITA	NL	US	Certifications
Steps in Time	Released: 5 November 1984; Label: CBS; Formats: LP, MC	6	49	—	17	140	UK: Gold
Bitter Sweet	Released: 11 November 1985; Label: CBS; Formats: CD, LP, MC	16	—	21	—	—	UK: Gold
"—" denotes releases that did not chart or were not released in that territory.

==== Compilation albums ====
Title	Album details
The 12" Tape	Released: 1986; Label: CBS; Formats: MC
The Best of King – Love & Pride	Released: October 1998; Label: Columbia; Formats: CD
Remixes & Rarities	Released: 15 June 2018; Label: Cherry Pop; Formats: 2×CD
Soul On My Boots: The Collection	Released: 21 November 2025; Label: Cherry Pop; Formats: 5×CD

==== Video albums ====
Title	Album details
From Steps in Time to Bitter Sweet –The Video Singles	Released: December 1985; Label: CBS Fox Video; Formats: VHS

=== Singles ===
Title	Year	Peak chart positions										Certifications	Album
Title	Year	UK	AUS	BEL (FL)	GER	IRE	ITA	NL	NZ	SWI	US	Certifications	Album
"Love & Pride"	1984	84	—	—	—	—	—	—	—	—	—		Steps in Time
"Soul on My Boots"	1984	158	—	—	—	—	—	—	—	—	—		Steps in Time
"Won't You Hold My Hand Now"	1984	112	—	—	—	—	—	—	—	—	—		Steps in Time
"Love & Pride" (re-release)	1985	2	8	3	8	3	15	2	24	3	55	UK: Gold	Steps in Time
"Won't You Hold My Hand Now" (re-release)	1985	24	86	14	—	16	—	—	—	—	—		Steps in Time
"Alone Without You"	1985	8	—	—	—	10	9	—	14	—	—		Bitter Sweet
"The Taste of Your Tears"	1985	11	—	15	—	12	—	50	—	—	—		Bitter Sweet
"Torture"	1985	23	—	—	—	12	—	—	—	—	—		Bitter Sweet
"—" denotes releases that did not chart or were not released in that territory.

=== Solo ===
Paul King

- Joy (1987)
