= I Got You Babe =

1965 single by Sonny & Cher

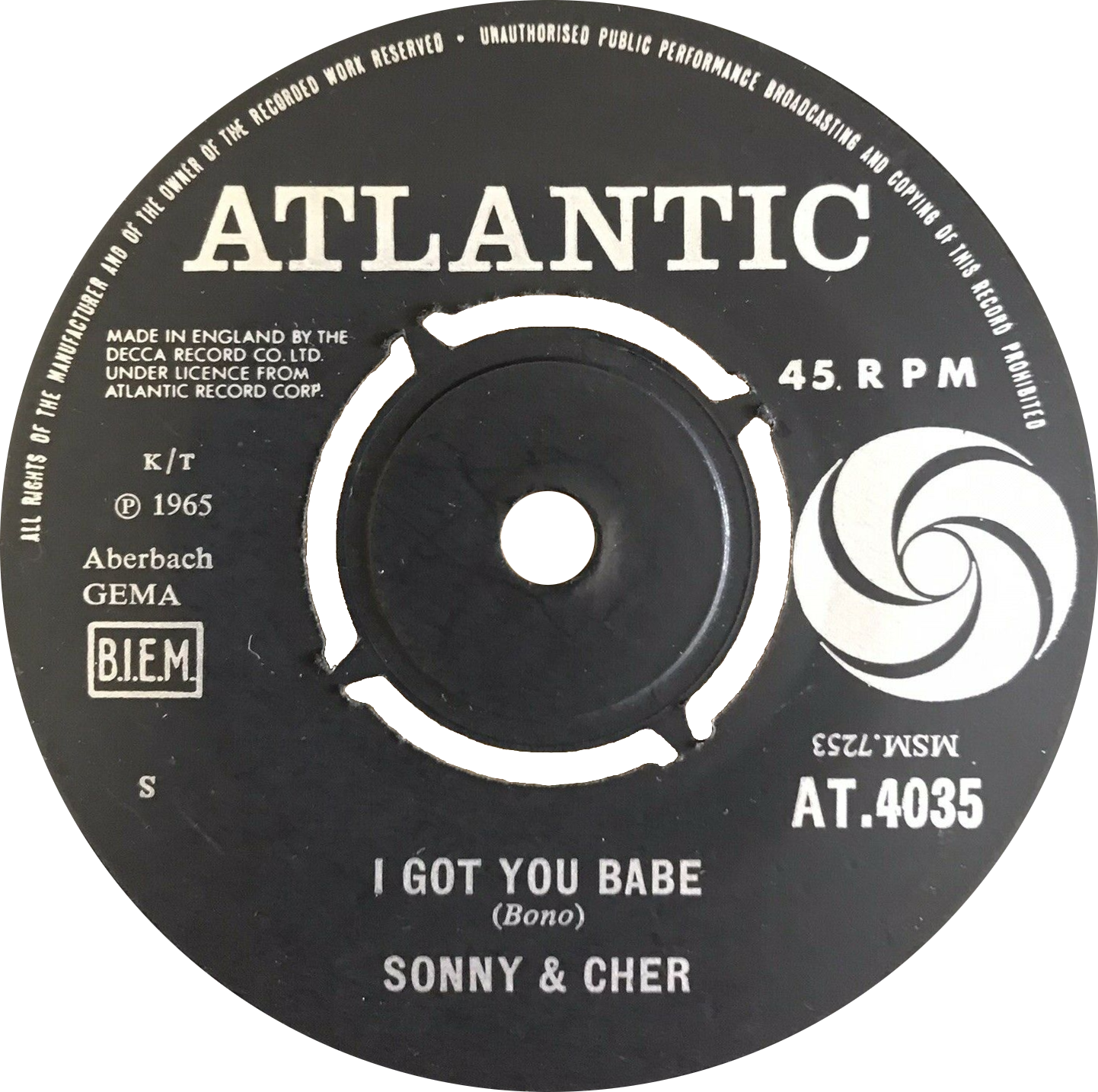
- Side A of the UK single

Single by Sonny & Cher

from the album Look at Us
- B-side: "It's Gonna Rain"
- Released: June 1965
- Recorded: June 7, 1965
- Studio: Gold Star, Hollywood
- Genre: Folk rock; pop
- Length: 3:11
- Label: Atco
- Songwriter: Sonny Bono
- Producer: Sonny Bono

Sonny & Cher singles chronology
"Baby Don't Go" (1964)	"I Got You Babe" (1965)	"The Letter" (1965)

"I Got You Babe" is a song performed by American pop and entertainment duo Sonny & Cher and written by Sonny Bono. It was the first single taken from their debut studio album, Look at Us (1965). It first charted on July 10, 1965, and spent three weeks at number one on the Billboard Hot 100 in August 1965. It sold more than one million copies and was certified gold by the RIAA. It also reached number one in the United Kingdom and Canada.

In 1968, R&B singer Etta James released a cover version, which peaked at number 69 on the Billboard singles chart for that year.

In 1985, a cover version of "I Got You Babe" by British reggae-pop band UB40 featuring American singer Chrissie Hynde peaked at number one on the UK Singles Chart and reached number 28 on the US Billboard Hot 100 chart. In 1993, Cher re-recorded the song as a duet with American animated characters Beavis and Butt-Head; this peaked at number 35 in the UK and became a top 10 hit in the Netherlands.

== Sonny & Cher version ==
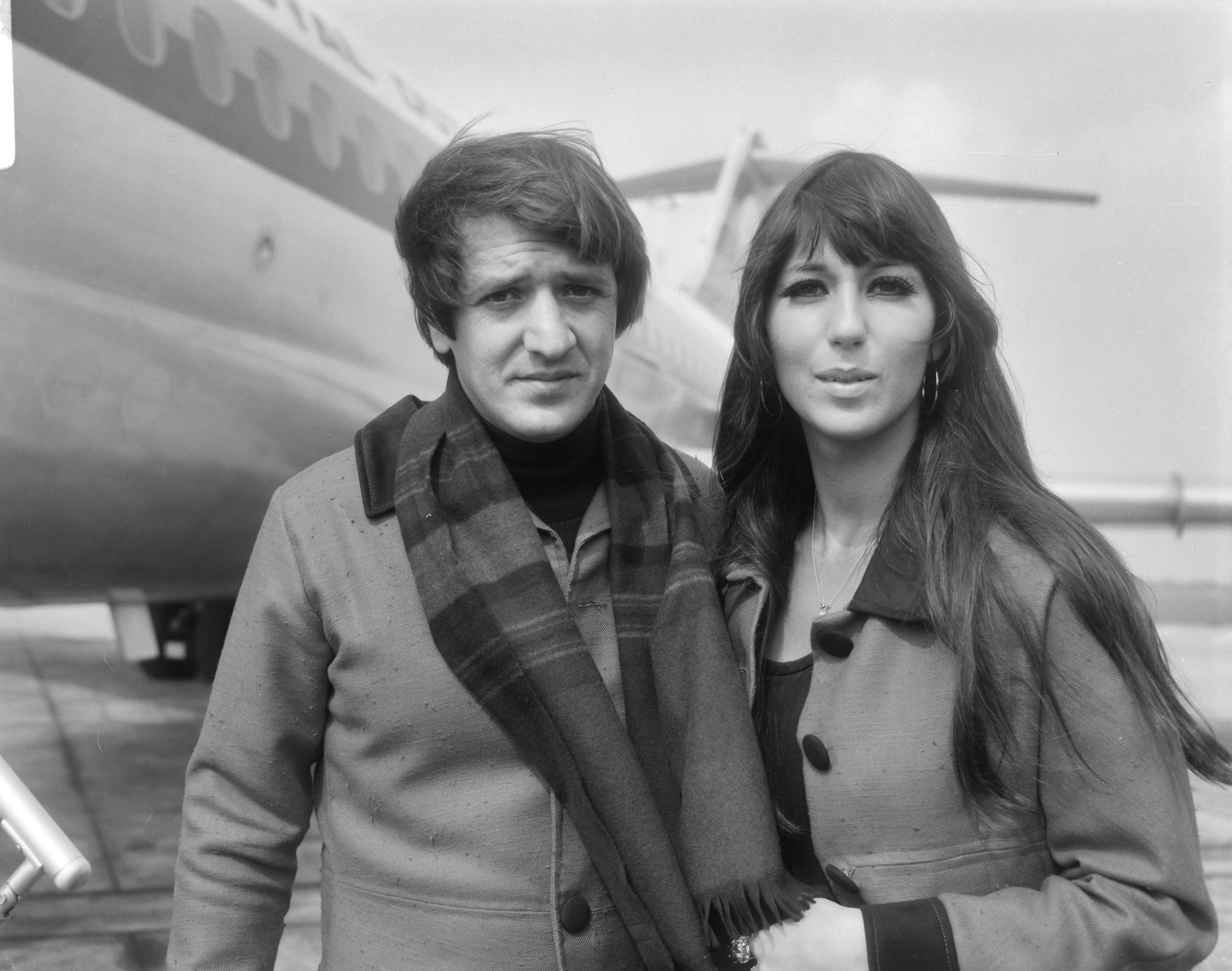
Sonny & Cher, 1966

=== Background and composition ===
Sonny Bono, a songwriter and record producer for Phil Spector, wrote the lyrics and composed the music of the song for himself and his live-in girlfriend, Cher, late at night in their basement. When Cher was woken up to sing the lyrics, she hated the song, not thinking it would be a hit, and immediately went back to bed. "I Got You Babe" became the duo Sonny & Cher's biggest single, their signature song, and a defining recording of the early hippie countercultural movement. Billboard said of the song "using the successful combination of folk and rock, this one has the performance and production of a smash." Record World called it "a meandering, funky piece of rock that will hit the top".

AllMusic critic William Ruhlmann praised the song:

Recalling Dylan's bitter 1964 song "It Ain't Me Babe" (soon to be a folk-rock hit for the Turtles), Bono wrote his own opposite sentiment: "I Got You Babe." Where Dylan was lyrically complex, Bono was simple: His lyrics began with the ominous youth-versus-grownups theme of "they" who set up barriers to romance, but soon gave way to a dialogue of teenage romantic platitudes. Where Dylan was musically simple, however, Bono, without fully rebuilding Spector's Wall of Sound, was more structurally ambitious, following the song's standard verse-chorus-verse-chorus-bridge-verse-chorus form with an ascending coda that built to a climax, then started building again before the fadeout, all in only a little over three minutes. Set to waltz time, the tune retained a light feel despite the sometimes busy instrumentation, led by a prominent ocarina [in fact an oboe – see below], and the alternating vocals of the two singers. If neither were interesting singers, their plodding, matter-of-fact performances gave the song a common-man appeal.

The recording session for the song was held on June 7, 1965, at Gold Star Studios in Hollywood and lasted between 2 and 5 PM. Harold Battiste provided the instrumental arrangement, and session musicians The Wrecking Crew performed the instrumental track. Richard Niles quotes Battiste as saying the prominent instrumental figure in the song is actually played on an oboe rather than an ocarina.

In the United States, the song had sold more than 1 million copies in 1965, being certified Gold by the RIAA. As of November 2011, Billboard reported the digital sales of "I Got You Babe" to be 372,000 in the US.

In 2011, the song was named as one of the greatest duets of all time by both Billboard and Rolling Stone magazines. It was also listed at number 444 on Rolling Stone's list of the 500 Greatest Songs of All Time in 2004. But in a 2011 poll Rolling Stone readers ranked "I Got You Babe" the eighth-worst song of the 1960s. In early 2017 the song was inducted into the Grammy Hall of Fame.

=== Live performances ===
Sonny and Cher last performed the song together during an impromptu reunion on NBC's Late Night with David Letterman on November 13, 1987. Cher performed the song with R.E.M. on February 14, 2002, at the Kodak Theatre in Los Angeles. It was her first performance of the song without Bono, following his death in a skiing accident in 1998. During Cher's 2014 Dressed to Kill Tour and 2017–2020 Las Vegas residency Classic Cher using left behind vocals and a projection of videos of Bono, Cher performed the song live with the projection of Bono. The song is performed the same way during Cher's 2018–2020 Here We Go Again Tour.

Cher sang a parody version of the song called "I Got You Bae" with James Corden on The Late Late Show with James Corden in 2016. The parody explained finding love in the modern 2016 era of online dating, swiping, social media, Netflix and chill, and internet pornography.

=== In popular culture ===
"I Got You Babe" has been featured in film and television, most notably in the 1993 film Groundhog Day, where it is repeatedly used as Phil Connors's (Bill Murray) wake-up music. The song was also performed by Sonny and Cher on The Sonny & Cher Comedy Hour.

=== Personnel ===
The personnel, excluding Sonny & Cher, as seen in the American Federation of Musicians (AFM) contracts for the session include:

- Harold Battiste – arrangement
- Barney Kessel – guitar
- Steve Mann – guitar
- Donald Peake – guitar
- Ervan Coleman – guitar
- Don Randi – piano
- Michel Rubini – harpsichord
- Lyle Ritz – bass guitar
- Clifford Hils – upright bass
- Frank Capp – drums
- Julius Wechter – bells
- Warren Webb – oboe
- Morris Crawford – bassoon

=== Charts ===
==== Weekly charts ====
Chart (1965)	Peak position
Australia (Kent Music Report)	3
Austria (Ö3 Austria Top 40)	6
Belgium (Ultratop 50 Flanders)	12
Canada (RPM Singles Chart)	1
Finland (The Official Finnish Charts)	8
France (SNEP)	7
Ireland (Irish Singles Chart)	2
Netherlands (Dutch Top 40)	4
Netherlands (Single Top 100)	4
New Zealand (Lever Hit Parade)	1
New Zealand (Recorded Music NZ)	1
Norway (VG-lista)	6
Quebec (ADISQ)	1
Singapore Singles Chart	5
South Africa (RiSA)	5
Spain (Promusicae)	8
Sweden (Sverigetopplistan)	5
Switzerland (Swiss Hitparade)	7
UK Singles (OCC)	1
US Billboard Hot 100	1
US Billboard R&B Singles	19
US Cash Box Top 100	1
West Germany (GfK)	3
Zimbabwe Singles Chart	2

Chart (1993)	Peak position
Portugal	7
UK Singles (OCC)	66

==== Year-end charts ====
Chart (1965)	Position
Dutch Top 100	31
Norway	12
UK Singles (OCC)	9
US Billboard Hot 100	16
US Cash Box Top 100	14
West German Singles Chart	27

=== Certifications ===
Region	Certification	Certified units/sales
New Zealand (RMNZ) Digital	Platinum	30,000^{‡}
United Kingdom 1965 release	—	500,000
United Kingdom (BPI) sales since 2004	Gold	400,000^{‡}
United States (RIAA)	Gold	1,000,000^{^}
Digital
United States	—	372,000
Summaries
Worldwide	—	3,000,000
^{^} Shipments figures based on certification alone.^{‡} Sales+streaming figures based on certification alone.

== UB40 and Chrissie Hynde version ==
"I Got You Babe"
- Green sleeve for US single

Single by UB40 and Chrissie Hynde

from the album Baggariddim
- B-side: "Theme from Labour of Love"
- Released: July 15, 1985
- Genre: Reggae; lovers rock
- Length: 3:09
- Label: DEP International
- Songwriter: Sonny Bono
- Producer: Pablo Falconer

UB40 singles chronology
"I'm Not Fooled So Easily" (1984)	"I Got You Babe" (1985)	"Don't Break My Heart" (1985)

Chrissie Hynde singles chronology
"I Got You Babe" (1985)	"Breakfast in Bed" (1988)

=== Background ===
Twenty years later, in July 1985, British band UB40 with American singer Chrissie Hynde released a cover version of "I Got You Babe" for the group's sixth studio album, Baggariddim (1985). This version charted at number one on the UK Singles Chart and reached number 28 on the US Billboard Hot 100 chart. The song also appeared on the Pretenders' 1987 compilation album The Singles.

=== Track listings ===
- 7-inch single
1. "I Got You Babe" 3:08
2. "Theme From Labour Of Love" 3:05
- 12-inch single
1. "I Got You Babe" 3:09
2. "Red Red Wine" 5:21

=== Charts ===
==== Weekly charts ====
Chart (1985)	Peak position
Australia (Kent Music Report)	1
Austria (Ö3 Austria Top 40)	14
Belgium (Ultratop 50 Flanders)	4
Canada Top Singles (RPM)	6
Canada Adult Contemporary (RPM)	6
Europe (European Hot 100 Singles)	7
France (SNEP)	29
Ireland (IRMA)	1
Netherlands (Dutch Top 40)	1
Netherlands (Single Top 100)	2
New Zealand (Recorded Music NZ)	1
Sweden (Sverigetopplistan)	17
Switzerland (Schweizer Hitparade)	15
UK Singles (Official Charts)	1
US Billboard Hot 100	28
West Germany (GfK)	15

==== Year-end charts ====
Chart (1985)	Position
Australia (Kent Music Report)	8
Belgium (Ultratop)	32
Canada Top Singles (RPM)	51
Netherlands (Single Top 100)	16
New Zealand (RIANZ)	2
UK Singles (OCC)	15

=== Certifications ===
Region	Certification	Certified units/sales
New Zealand (RMNZ)	2× Platinum	60,000^{‡}
United Kingdom (BPI)	Gold	500,000^{^}
^{^} Shipments figures based on certification alone.^{‡} Sales+streaming figures based on certification alone.

== Cher with Beavis and Butt-Head version ==
"I Got You Babe"

Single by Cher with Beavis and Butt-Head

from the album The Beavis and Butt-Head Experience
- Released: November 29, 1993
- Genre: Pop; rock; heavy metal
- Length: 4:00
- Label: Geffen
- Songwriter: Sonny Bono
- Producer: Nellee Hooper

Cher singles chronology
"Whenever You're Near" (1993)	"I Got You Babe" (1993)	"Love Can Build a Bridge" (1995)

Music video
- "I Got You Babe" on YouTube

Audio sample
- "I Got You Babe": file; help

=== Background ===
In 1993, Cher re-recorded "I Got You Babe" with the American animated characters Beavis and Butt-Head (Mike Judge). The song was the first single from The Beavis and Butt-Head Experience, a compilation comedy album released in 1993 by Geffen Records, which is one of the fastest-selling comedy albums; it has officially sold 1,610,000 units and was certified 2× Platinum by the RIAA in the United States. The single reached the top 40 in the UK, Belgium and Sweden, as well as the top 10 in the Netherlands.

=== Critical reception ===
A reviewer from AllMusic felt "I Got You Babe" is the "most interesting" track on The Beavis and Butt-head Experience album. Larry Flick from Billboard stated that Cher "delivers one of her strongest vocals to date." Troy J. Augusto from Cashbox viewed it as a "fun moment" from the album. Rob Fiend from the Gavin Report called it "a lovely duet", adding that "one can hardly keep the tears from flowing." In his weekly UK chart commentary, James Masterton wrote, that "MTVs doyens of bad taste, Beavis and Butt-Head charge onto vinyl in their own inimitable fashion on a remake of the 1960s classic." Sarah Kestle from Melody Maker declared it as "precious". Pan-European magazine Music & Media described it as "a smashing rendition".

Martin Aston from Music Week gave it four out of five, writing that it "is undoubtedly the worst version of her and Sonny's classic Sixties cut, but the funniest too. Potential media exposure for this irreverent novelty item seems unlimited." A reviewer from Rolling Stone said that "Cher proves she's a good sport (or something) by letting B&B help her sing". Mark Sutherland from Smash Hits declared it as a "hilarious" duet. Rob Sheffield from Spin found that "Cher herself shows up to chat about Sonny" and "croon a truly mind-boggling" "I Got You Babe".

=== Music video ===
A funny and psychedelic music video was produced for the song, which received heavy MTV airplay. It featured Cher and Beavis and Butt-Head in a virtual animated world. In the video, the animated pair refer to her former husband Bono as a dork and a wuss, to which a live-action Cher agrees. It was placed at number 5 on the "50 Greatest Funny Moments in Music" list made by VH1 channel in 2004. On April 29, 2022, Cher's official YouTube channel uploaded the music video in remastered HD.

=== Track listings ===
- European CD single
1. "I Got You Babe" (Cher with Beavis and Butt-Head) – 5:09
2. "Mental ✳@%#!" (Jackyl) – 4:42
3. "Fire Down Below" (Cher) – 4:20
- UK CD and cassette single
1. "I Got You Babe" (Cher with Beavis and Butt-Head) – 4:00
2. "I Got You Babe" (Sonny & Cher) – 3:13

=== Charts ===
==== Weekly charts ====
Chart (1993–1994)	Peak position
Australia (ARIA)	69
Belgium (Ultratop 50 Flanders)	19
Europe (European Hot 100 Singles)	69
Netherlands (Dutch Top 40)	9
Netherlands (Single Top 100)	10
Sweden (Sverigetopplistan)	40
UK Singles (Official Charts)	35
US Bubbling Under Hot 100 (Billboard)	8

==== Year-end charts ====
Chart (1994)	Position
Netherlands (Dutch Top 40)	69

== In other media ==
- In the 1977 Good Times episode "The Evans Get Involved (Part 2)", characters perform the song while mimicking The Sonny & Cher Comedy Hour.
- In the 1993 film Groundhog Day it is the song that Bill Murray as Phil Connors, the main character, awakens to each morning.
- In the 2014 video game The Last of Us: Left Behind, the Etta James cover of the song is featured in the final section of the game's flashback storyline. The song was featured again in the first season's seventh episode "Left Behind" of the television adaptation of The Last of Us. Neil Druckmann, the creator and writer of the game and the co-creator of the show, felt the song's romantic lyrics hidden by joyous music mirrored the feelings of Ellie (Bella Ramsey) and Riley Abel (Storm Reid).
- The Etta James version was used by Walmart for its 2021 holiday ad campaign.
- The song appears in Season 2, episode 7 of the Apple TV comedy series Ted Lasso, playing during a sequence overlaying characters Roy and Keely's increasingly close relationship.
- Released in 2024, the song appears instrumentally at the end of the episode and again as a parody during the end credits of Season 2, Episode 3 of the Disney Televsion Animation show Monsters at Work, a spin-off to the Pixar movies Monsters, Inc. and Monsters University. The parody version is titled "I Scare You Babe," and is performed by Bob Peterson (the voice of Roze) and Alan Tudyk (the voice of the maître d').
