= Rose-Marie (singer) =

Northern Irish singer (1956–2024)

- Born: Rose-Marie Kane; 7 February 1956; Newry, County Down
- Died: 5 June 2024 (aged 68); Blackpool, Lancashire, England
- Occupation: Singer
- Years active: 1980s–2024
- Musical career
- Genres: Pop
- Instrument: Vocals

Rose-Marie Kane (7 February 1956 – 5 June 2024) was a singer from Northern Ireland.

== Early life ==
Rose-Marie Kane was born on 7 February 1956, as one of six siblings born to Ann and Owen Kane. She was raised on a farm outside Newry, County Down.

== Career ==
While Rose-Marie enjoyed success as a local and national television personality in the United Kingdom, she also released nineteen albums.

At the International Music Awards, Rose-Marie was voted Most Popular Singer. She sold out the London Palladium on more than one occasion.

Rose-Marie served as a judge for two series of the BBC talent show Go For It. Her other television appearances included The Royal Variety Show, Shooting Stars, Doctors, Big Brother's Little Brother, a documentary of herself and various chat shows. As well as her work on television, she was involved in acting in several stage productions and on radio, and played Rita in the 2001 film Cold Fish.

Rose-Marie was also involved in charity work, including the promotion of road safety and charity for the underprivileged. Her legs were insured by Lloyd's of London.

== Death ==
On 5 June 2024, Rose-Marie died at the age of 68 in Blackpool. Her cause of death was not confirmed.

== Selected discography ==
=== UK singles ===
- "When I Leave the World Behind" (1983) – UK #63
- "Let the Rest of the World Go By" (1984) – UK #76
- "All the Love (in the World)" (1985) – UK #91

=== UK albums ===
- Rose Marie Sings Just For You (1985) – UK #30
- So Lucky (1986) – UK #62
- Sentimentally Yours (1987) – UK #22
- Together Again (1988) – UK #52
- Memories Of Home (1996) – UK #51
