= Don't Break My Heart (UB40 song) =

1985 single by UB40

Single by UB40

from the album Baggariddim
- B-side: "Mek Ya Rok"
- Released: 14 October 1985
- Genre: Reggae fusion
- Length: 3:58
- Label: DEP International; A&M
- Songwriters: UB40; Deborah Banks
- Producers: UB40; Ray "Pablo" Falconer

UB40 singles chronology
"I Got You Babe" (1985)	"Don't Break My Heart" (1985)	"Sing Our Own Song" (1986)

"Don't Break My Heart" is a song by British reggae band UB40 from their sixth album Baggariddim. A remixed version was released as a single in October 1985 and peaked at number three on the UK Singles Chart, making it their highest charting original song.

== Songwriting dispute ==
On its release, the songwriting credits were only given to UB40, apart from in the US where the single and album credited the lyrics as being written by Javid Khan and the music by UB40. Khan was a singer and the next-door neighbour of UB40 lead singer Ali Campbell. However, in 1992, Deborah Banks, a secretary in Birmingham, took legal action again UB40 and the music publishers, claiming she had written the majority of the lyrics for "Don't Break My Heart".

In the 1980s, Banks and Khan were friendly and Khan was struggling to write an appropriate song, so Banks, who was also an amateur poet, wrote two for him. Khan was paid £10,000 by the band for "Don't Break My Heart" who were under the impression that Khan had written the song, with Banks not receiving any recognition or payment. The case went to the High Court in 1995 presided by judge Jeremiah Harman. Khan denied the lyrics were written by Banks, saying that they had "come from my head". However, Judge Harman ruled in favour of Banks, stating that Khan had no right to sell the song and UB40 had no right to record it, and awarding her royalties from the song. Following the verdict, subsequent albums released with "Don't Break My Heart" co-credited Banks and UB40 as writing the lyrics.

== Track listing ==
7": DEP International / DEP 22

1. "Don't Break My Heart" – 3:58
2. "Mek Ya Rok" – 3:39

12": DEP International / DEP 22-12

1. "Don't Break My Heart" – 7:12
2. "Mek Ya Rok" – 6:19

== Charts ==
Chart (1985–1986)	Peak position
Australia (Kent Music Report)	37
Belgium (Ultratop 50 Flanders)	15
Ireland (IRMA)	8
Netherlands (Dutch Top 40)	13
Netherlands (Single Top 100)	11
New Zealand (Recorded Music NZ)	13
UK Singles (OCC)	3

== Certifications ==
Region	Certification	Certified units/sales
New Zealand (RMNZ)	Gold	15,000^{‡}
United Kingdom (BPI)	Silver	250,000^{^}
^{^} Shipments figures based on certification alone.^{‡} Sales+streaming figures based on certification alone.
