= Love & Pride =

1984 single by King

Single by King

from the album Steps in Time
- Released: April 1984
- Length: 3:20
- Label: CBS
- Songwriters: Paul King; Mick Roberts
- Producer: Richard James Burgess

King singles chronology
"Love & Pride" (1984)	"Soul on My Boots" (1984)

"Love & Pride" is a song by the English band King, produced by Richard James Burgess and included on the band's debut studio album, Steps in Time. It was released as their debut single in 1984 but was not a success initially, reaching No. 84 on the UK singles chart. However, after the group performed the song on Saturday morning television at the end of 1984, CBS Records re-released the song, and it peaked at No. 2 on the UK chart in February 1985, remaining there for three consecutive weeks. In the United States, "Love & Pride" stalled at No. 55 on the Billboard Hot 100, but it was more popular in clubs, where two separate 12-inch remixes propelled it to No. 17 on the Billboard Dance/Disco Club Play chart.

== Track listings ==
7-inch CBS Records / A 4988 (UK)

A. "Love & Pride" – 3:20
B. "Don't Stop" – 4:15

2 x 7-inch (Double Pack) CBS Records / DA 4988 (UK)

A1. "Love & Pride" – 3:20
A2. "Don't Stop" – 4:15
B1. "Love & Pride" (live version)
B2. "I Kissed the Spikey Fridge" (live version)

12-inch CBS Records / TX 4988 (UK)

A1. "Love & Pride" (Body & Soul mix) – 5:27
B1. "Don't Stop" (edit) – 3:38
B2. "Classic Strangers" – 3:32

12-inch Epic / 49 05236 (US)

A. "Love & Pride" (extended mix) – 6:14
B. "Love & Pride" (dub mix) – 4:05

== Charts ==
=== Weekly charts ===
Chart (1985)	Peak position
Australia (Kent Music Report)	8
Austria (Ö3 Austria Top 40)	21
Belgium (Ultratop 50 Flanders)	3
Europe (European Top 100 Singles)	9
Ireland (IRMA)	3
Netherlands (Dutch Top 40)	2
Netherlands (Single Top 100)	2
New Zealand (Recorded Music NZ)	24
South Africa (Springbok Radio)	7
Switzerland (Schweizer Hitparade)	3
UK Singles (OCC)	2
US Billboard Hot 100	55
US 12-inch Singles Sales (Billboard) Remix	45
US Dance/Disco Club Play (Billboard) Remix	17
West Germany (GfK)	8

=== Year-end charts ===
Chart (1985)	Position
Australia (Kent Music Report)	80
Belgium (Ultratop 50 Flanders)	34
Netherlands (Dutch Top 40)	18
Netherlands (Single Top 100)	26
UK Singles (OCC)	10
West Germany (Media Control)	68
