= Phyllis Nelson =

American singer (1950–1998)

- Born: October 3, 1950; Jacksonville, Florida, U.S.
- Died: January 12, 1998 (aged 47) Los Angeles, California, U.S.
- Genres: Dance, R&B, freestyle
- Occupation: Singer
- Instrument: Vocals
- Years active: 1981–1998
- Labels: Hallmark Records, Carrere

Phyllis Nelson (October 3, 1950 – January 12, 1998) was an American singer, most famous for her 1985 song "Move Closer", which topped the UK Singles Chart. Her son is the singer and record producer Marc Nelson, who was a member of Boyz II Men.

== Career ==
Nelson was born in Jacksonville, Florida, and a member of family group Nelson Five. She was later a backup singer for Major Harris and Philly Cream. She worked and recorded for several years from the late 1970s to the mid-1980s. Her records were mostly dance oriented. She also recorded numerous records during the disco era.

In 1984, she recorded a self-written ballad titled "Move Closer". It was a complete departure from the type of music she had been recording. The lyrics of "Move Closer" were based on a long-term love affair she had with a much younger man in Philadelphia, who was struggling to start his own computer business. They lived together for several years, raising Nelson's two children (Marc and Kenya) that she had from previous relationships.

While "Move Closer" failed to find an audience in her native United States, it was successful in the United Kingdom, where it peaked at the top of the UK Singles Chart in April 1985. The song remained on the chart for almost six months, and became one of Britain's best-selling singles of the year.

In France she recorded a single, "I Don't Know", with the French actor Alain Delon. It was included in the original soundtrack of the 1985 French film Parole De Flic (Cop's Honor). Her subsequent releases failed to make any impression (except "I Like You" which made No. 81), and she is remembered as a one-hit wonder.

In the United States, she had success on the Hot Dance Club Play chart, where her song "I Like You" peaked at No. 1 in 1985 and No. 61 on the Hot 100. "Move Closer" returned to the UK chart in 1994, reaching the top 40, after being featured in a television commercial for anti-perspirant.

== Death ==
Nelson died in January 1998 at the age of 47 from breast cancer in Los Angeles, California, where she had been living since her divorce.

Her son Marc also enjoyed a recording career, being a co-founder member of the group Boyz II Men.

== Discography ==
=== Albums ===
Year	Title	Chart positions			Record label
Year	Title	AUS	NZ	UK	Record label
1984	Move Closer	—	—	29	Carrere Records
1985	I Like You	88	39	—	Hallmark
"—" denotes a recording that did not chart.

=== Singles ===
Year	Title	Chart positions								Certifications	Album
Year	Title	US Hot 100	US Dance	US R&B	AUS	BEL	NL	NZ	UK	Certifications	Album
1981	"Don't Stop the Train"	—	20	—	—	—	—	—	—		I Like You
1983	"Stop Don't Do This to Me"	—	—	—	—	—	—	—	—		Move Closer
1983	"Take Me Nowhere" (France only)	—	—	—	—	—	—	—	—		Move Closer
1985	"Move Closer"	—	—	—	15	34	47	23	1	BPI: Gold	Move Closer
1985	"I Don't Know"	—	—	—	—	—	—	—	—		N/A
1985	"I Like You"	61	1	65	—	—	—	17	81		I Like You
1994	"Move Closer" (re-issue)	—	—	—	—	—	—	—	34		Move Closer
"—" denotes a recording that did not chart or was not released in that territory.

== See also ==
- List of Billboard number-one dance club songs
- List of artists who reached number one on the U.S. Dance Club Songs chart
- List of artists who reached number one on the UK Singles Chart
- List of performers on Top of the Pops
