= Chris de Burgh discography =

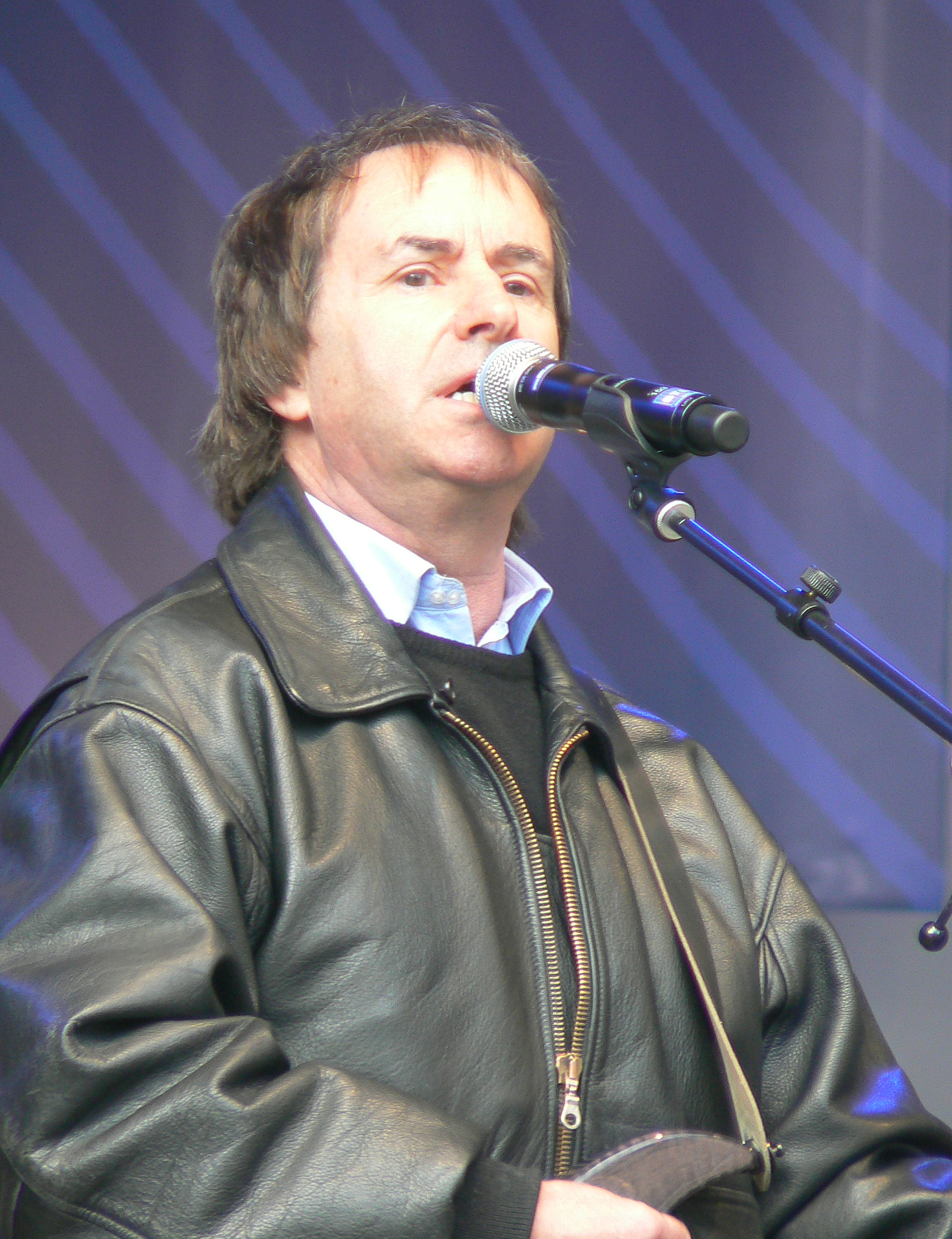
- De Burgh performing in Düsseldorf, Germany
- Studio albums: 23
- Live albums: 4
- Compilation albums: 9
- Singles: 66
- Video albums: 8
- Box sets: 1

The discography of British-Irish musician Chris de Burgh consists of 23 studio albums, 9 compilation albums, 4 live albums, and 66 singles, along with 8 videos and DVDs and one box set. His 23 studio albums consist of 19 of completely new material, 2 albums of cover versions, 1 album featuring a mix of new songs, cover versions, and re-recordings and 1 consisting of acoustic versions of previously released tracks. His debut album, Far Beyond These Castle Walls, released in 1974, reached number 1 in Brazil, but failed to chart elsewhere.

De Burgh's first album to chart in the UK Albums Chart was The Getaway, released in 1982, charting at number 30. His earlier albums, Spanish Train and Other Stories and Crusader charted after this success. De Burgh's first album to reach number one in the UK Albums Chart was 1988's Flying Colours, his second top 10 album chart placing after 1986's Into the Light.

Chris de Burgh was signed to A&M Records for many years (1974–2004), but he now has his own label, Ferryman Productions. His recent albums are released by German label, Edel Records.

== Albums ==
=== Studio albums ===
Title	Album details	Peak chart positions										Certifications
Title	Album details	UK	AUS	AUT	CAN	GER	IRE	NL	NOR	SWI	US	Certifications
Far Beyond These Castle Walls	Released: 1974; Label: A&M; Format: CD, cassette, LP	—	—	—	—	—	—	—	—	—	—	
Spanish Train and Other Stories	Released: 1975; Label: A&M; Format: CD, cassette, LP	78	—	—	64	—	—	—	35	—	—	MC: Platinum
At the End of a Perfect Day	Released: 1977; Label: A&M; Format: CD, cassette, LP	—	—	—	94	—	—	—	—	—	—	
Crusader	Released: January 1979; Label: A&M; Format: CD, cassette, LP	72	62	—	67	—	—	—	—	—	—	MC: Gold
Eastern Wind	Released: July 1980; Label: A&M; Format: CD, cassette, LP	—	—	—	26	—	—	—	1	—	—	MC: Gold
The Getaway	Released: September 1982; Label: A&M; Format: CD, cassette, LP	30	18	3	9	1	—	—	1	—	43	BVMI: Platinum; MC: Platinum
Man on the Line	Released: 7 May 1984; Label: A&M; Format: CD, cassette, LP	11	51	9	13	1	—	46	6	1	69	BPI: Silver; BVMI: Platinum; MC: Platinum
Into the Light	Released: 27 May 1986; Label: A&M; Format: CD, cassette, LP	2	14	19	10	2	1	9	1	2	25	BPI: 2× Platinum; BVMI: 2× Platinum; MC: 2× Platinum; RIAA: Gold
Flying Colours	Released: 3 October 1988; Label: A&M; Format: CD, cassette, LP	1	37	—	17	1	1	16	10	2	—	BPI: Platinum; BVMI: Platinum; IFPI SWI: Gold; MC: Platinum
Power of Ten	Released: April 1992; Label: A&M; Format: CD, cassette, LP	3	81	29	24	1	—	38	7	3	—	BPI: Gold; BVMI: Gold; IFPI SWI: Gold
This Way Up	Released: 16 May 1994; Label: A&M; Format: CD, cassette, LP	5	149	37	—	4	—	28	—	5	—	BPI: Silver; BVMI: Gold; IFPI SWI: Gold
Beautiful Dreams	Released: 6 November 1995; Label: A&M; Format: CD, cassette, LP	33	—	—	—	29	—	57	5	24	—	BPI: Gold
Quiet Revolution	Released: September 1999; Label: A&M; Format: CD, cassette, LP	23	—	—	—	6	—	45	—	10	—	BVMI: Gold
Timing Is Everything	Released: 2002; Label: A&M; Format: CD, LP	41	—	—	—	12	—	76	—	18	—	
The Road to Freedom	Released: 2004; Label: Edel; Format: CD, LP	75	—	42	—	5	22	18	—	22	—	BVMI: Gold
The Storyman	Released: 2006; Label: Edel; Format: CD, LP	38	—	—	—	8	—	18	—	28	—	
Footsteps	Released: 2008; Label: Edel; Format: CD, LP	4	—	38	—	9	22	—	—	22	—	BPI: Silver; BVMI: Platinum; IFPI SWI: Gold
Moonfleet & Other Stories	Released: 2010; Label: Ferryman Productions; Format: CD, LP	25	—	42	100	3	33	—	—	31	—	BVMI: Gold
Footsteps 2	Released: 14 October 2011; Label: Ferryman Productions; Format: CD, LP	38	—	44	—	10	—	—	—	3	—	BVMI: Gold
Home	Released: 12 October 2012; Label: Ferryman Productions; Format: CD, LP	92	—	48	—	15	—	—	—	19	—	
The Hands of Man	Released: 26 September 2014; Label: Rockware; Format: CD, LP	71	—	37	—	8	—	—	—	—	—	
A Better World	Released: 23 September 2016; Label: Rockware; Format: CD, LP	60	—	49	—	7	—	78	—	17	—	
The Legend of Robin Hood	Released: 3 September 2021; Label: Rockware; Format: CD, LP	19	—	26	—	7	—	—	—	16	—	
"—" denotes releases that did not chart or were not released in that territory.

=== Live albums ===
Title	Album details	Peak chart positions					Certifications
Title	Album details	UK	AUT	GER	NL	SWI	Certifications
Live in South Africa	Released: 1979; Label: A&M; Format: CD, Cassette, LP	—	—	—	—	—	
High on Emotion: Live from Dublin	Released: 11 September 1990; Label: A&M; Format: CD, cassette, LP	15	23	8	51	14	BPI: Gold; IFPI SWI: Gold
The River Sessions	Released: 2004; Label: Hypertension; Format: CD; Radio broadcast - not an official release	—	—	—	—	—	
Live in Dortmund	Released: May 2005; Label: SPV; Format: 2x CD	—	—	39	—	—	
"—" denotes releases that did not chart or were not released in that territory.

=== Compilation albums ===
Title	Album details	Peak chart positions								Certifications
Title	Album details	UK	AUS	AUT	CAN	GER	NL	NOR	SWI	Certifications
Best Moves	Released: 1981; Label: A&M; Format: CD, cassette, LP	65	—	—	47	5	—	4	—	MC: Gold
The Very Best of Chris de Burgh	Released: December 1984; Label: Telstar; Format: LP, cassette	6	12	—	—	—	—	—	—	BPI: Gold
Spark to a Flame: The Very Best of Chris de Burgh	Released: 23 October 1989; Label: A&M; Format: CD, cassette, LP	4	90	11	49	2	52	—	3	BPI: 2× Platinum; BVMI: Platinum; IFPI SWI: Platinum; MC: Gold
The Love Songs	Released: 29 September 1997; Label: A&M; Format: CD, cassette, LP	8	75	—	—	51	65	—	17	BPI: Gold
The Lady in Red (The Very Best of Chris De Burgh)	Released; 25 January 2000; Label: Ark 21; Format: CD, LP	—	—	—	—	—	—	—	—	
The Ultimate Collection	Released; 27 November 2000; Label: Eagle; Format: CD, LP	—	—	—	—	39	—	—	76	BPI: Gold
Notes from Planet Earth – The Ultimate Collection	Released: 19 March 2001; Label: A&M; Format: CD, LP	19	—	—	—	—	—	14	—	
20th Century Masters: The Best of Chris De Burgh	Released: 27 July 2004; Label: A&M; Format: CD, LP	—	—	—	—	—	—	—	—	
Gold	Released: 2007; Label: A&M; Format: CD, LP	—	—	—	—	—	—	—	—	
Now and Then	Released: 21 April 2008; Label: Universal TV; Format: CD, LP	12	—	—	—	—	—	—	—	
50 Years of Music	Released: 4 October 2024; Label: Telamo; Format: CD, LP	—	—	—	—	—	—	—	—	
"—" denotes releases that did not chart or were not released in that territory.

=== Box sets ===
- Much More Than This (2006)
- Essential Chris de Burgh (2022)

== Singles ==
=== 1970s ===
Year	Single	Peak chart positions		Certifications (sales thresholds)	Album
Year	Single	IRE	CAN AC	Certifications (sales thresholds)	Album
1974	"Hold On"	—	—		Far Beyond These Castle Walls
1975	"Turning Round"	—	—		Far Beyond These Castle Walls
1975	"A Spaceman Came Travelling"	1	22		Spanish Train and Other Stories
1975	"Just Another Poor Boy"	—	—		Spanish Train and Other Stories
1979	"The Devil's Eye"	—	—		Crusader

=== 1980s ===
Year	Single	Peak chart positions									Certifications (sales thresholds)	Album
Year	Single	AUS	CAN	IRE	GER	NED	NOR	SUI	UK	US	Certifications (sales thresholds)	Album
1980	"The Traveller"	—	—	—	—	—	—	—	—	106		Eastern Wind
1980	"Sailor"	—	—	16	—	—	—	—	—	—		Eastern Wind
1981	"Waiting for the Hurricane"	—	—	—	—	—	—	—	—	—		Best Moves
1982	"Don't Pay the Ferryman"	5	32	9	24	—	—	—	48	34		The Getaway
1982	"The Getaway"	—	—	—	24	—	8	—	—			The Getaway
1982	"Ship to Shore"	75	—	—	69	—	—	—	145	71		The Getaway
1982	"Where Peaceful Waters Flow"	—	—	17	52	—	—	—	—	—		The Getaway
1982	"Borderline"	—	—	12	—	—	—	—	—	—		The Getaway
1983	"High on Emotion"	91	27	5	12	—	—	5	44	44		Man on the Line
1984	"The Ecstasy of Flight (I Love the Night)"	—	—	20	49	—	—	29	80	—		Man on the Line
1984	"Sight and Touch"	—	—	—	—	—	—	—	189	—		Man on the Line
1986	"Fire on the Water"	100	85	19	46	—	—	16	88	—		Into the Light
1986	"Say Goodbye to It All"	59	51	—	—	—	—	—	—	—		Into the Light
1986	"The Lady in Red"	2	1	1	5	4	1	18	1	3	MC: Platinum; BPI: Gold	Into the Light
1986	"Fatal Hesitation"	—	—	7	—	—	—	—	44	—		Into the Light
1986	"A Spaceman Came Travelling (New Version)" / "The Ballroom of Romance"	—	—	15	—	—	—	—	40	—		Non-album single
1986	"One Word (Straight to the Heart)"	—	—	—	60	—	—	—	—	—		Into the Light
1987	"The Simple Truth (A Child Is Born)"	—	89^{1}	10	31	—	—	—	55	—		Non-album single
1988	"Love Is My Decision"	—	59	—	—	—	—	—	—	—		Arthur 2: On The Rocks Soundtrack
1988	"Missing You"	45	17	1	29	37	—	20	3	—		Flying Colours
1989	"Tender Hands"	—	—	18	—	—	—	—	43	—		Flying Colours
1989	"Sailing Away"	—	—	—	56	45	—	—	78	—		Flying Colours
1989	"Don't Look Back"	—	—	—	—	—	—	—	—	—		Flying Colours
1989	"This Waiting Heart"	—	—	15	36	—	—	27	59	—		Spark to a Flame
1989	"Diamond in the Dark"	—	—	14	—	—	—	—	95	—		Spark to a Flame
"—" denotes releases that did not chart or were not released in that territory.

^{1} Appeared in album chart as cassette EP with catalogue number for Wonderful Life (Black album)

=== 1990s ===
Year	Single	Peak chart positions						Certifications (sales thresholds)	Album
Year	Single	CAN	IRE	GER	NED	SUI	UK	Certifications (sales thresholds)	Album
1990	"Don't Pay the Ferryman (Live)"	—	—	—	—	—	84		High on Emotion: Live from Dublin
1991	"The Simple Truth (A Child is Born)" (Re-release)	—	—	—	50	—	36		Charity single for Campaign for Kurdish Refugees
1992	"Separate Tables"	39	14	39	—	25	30		Power of Ten
1992	"Where We Will Be Going"	—	—	—	—	—	91		Power of Ten
1992	"Making the Perfect Man"	—	—	—	—	—	87		Power of Ten
1992	"By My Side"	—	15	61	—	—	—		Power of Ten
1993	"Shine On"	—	—	—		—	95		Power of Ten
1993	"Talk to Me"	—	—	86	—	—	—		Power of Ten
1994	"This Weight On Me"	26	—	—	—	—	—		This Way Up
1994	"Blonde Hair, Blue Jeans"	80	27	56	—	—	51		This Way Up
1994	"This Silent World"	—	—	52	—	—	—		This Way Up
1994	"This Is Love"	—	—	55	—	—	—		This Way Up
1994	"Here Is Your Paradise"	—	—	—	—		101		This Way Up
1995	"The Snows of New York"	—	—	—	—	—	60		Beautiful Dreams
1996	"I'm Not Crying Over You"	—	—	—	—	—	78		Beautiful Dreams
1996	"Always on My Mind"	—	—	—	—	—	—		Beautiful Dreams
1996	"Riding on a Rainbow"	—	—	—	—	—	—		Non-album single
1997	"So Beautiful"	—	—	—	—	—	29		The Love Songs
1998	"Forevermore"	—	—	—	—	—	—		The Love Songs
1998	"In a Country Churchyard (New Version)"	—	—	—	—	—	—		The Love Songs
1999	"When I Think of You"	—	—	75	—	—	59		Quiet Revolution
1999	"A Woman's Heart"	—	—	96	—	—	—		Quiet Revolution
"—" denotes releases that did not chart or were not released in that territory.

=== 2000 onwards ===
Year	Single	Peak chart positions			Certifications (sales thresholds)	Album
Year	Single	IRE	GER	UK	Certifications (sales thresholds)	Album
2000	"Patricia the Stripper 2000"	—	—	—		Notes from Planet Earth
2001	"Two Sides to Every Story"	—	—	172		Notes from Planet Earth
2002	"Guilty Secret"	—	—	121		Timing Is Everything
2004	"The Words 'I Love You'"	—	—	—		The Road to Freedom
2004	"Read My Name (Remix)"	—	—	—		The Road to Freedom
2004	"Five Past Dreams"	—	—	—		The Road to Freedom
2005	"Patricia the Stripper (with Dustin)"	3	—	—		Charity single for National Children's Hospital
2006	"One World"		99	—		The Storyman
2006	"My Father's Eyes"	—	—	—		The Storyman
2007	"Raging Storm"	—	—	—		The Storyman
2008	"You'll Never Walk Alone"	—	—	—		Footsteps
2010	"Everywhere I Go"^{1}	—	—	—		Moonfleet & Other Stories
2010	"A Spaceman Came Travelling 2010"^{1}	—	—	187		
2011	"Go Where Your Heart Believes"^{1}	—	—	—		Moonfleet & Other Stories
2011	"S.O.S."^{1}	—	—	—		Footsteps 2
2016	"Bethlehem"^{1}	—	—	—		A Better World
2017	"Once in a Lifetime"^{1}	—	—	—		A Better World
2021	"Live Life, Live Well"^{1}	—	—	—		The Legend of Robin Hood
2024	"It's Never Too Late"^{1}	—	—	—		50
"—" denotes releases that did not chart or were not released in that territory.

^{1} Download-only singles - no physical releases

== Non-album tracks ==
In addition to the catalogue of songs featured on his studio albums, de Burgh has also recorded a number of songs not included on the original editions of the studio albums. These include new songs featured on compilation albums, soundtracks, live albums, single B-sides, stand-alone singles and songs featured on special edition releases of studio albums. The songs listed in the table below are available on official releases.

Title	First appearance	Year	Other appearances
Every Drop of Rain	Best Moves	1981	
Waiting for the Hurricane	Best Moves	1981	'Waiting for the Hurricane' single, The Very Best of Chris de Burgh, The Ultimate Collection, Home (acoustic version)
The Simple Truth (A Child Is Born)	Non-album single	1987	Bonus track on CD release of Flying Colours, Now and Then
Love is My Decision	'Arthur 2: On the Rocks' soundtrack	1988	Much More Than This box set
This Waiting Heart	Spark to a Flame	1989	"This Waiting Heart" single, The Ultimate Collection, Notes from Planet Earth, Now and Then
Diamond in the Dark	Spark to a Flame	1989	"Diamond in the Dark" single
Do What You Do (George Gershwin cover)	The Glory of Gershwin	1994	
Strangers on a Train	B-side to "Blonde Hair, Blue Jeans" single	1994	
When I See You Tonight	B-side to "This Silent World" single	1995	
The Ballad of Thunder Gulch	Privately pressed single	1995	
Riding on a Rainbow	‘Riding on a Rainbow’ single	1996	Bonus track on CD release of Live in South Africa
That's What Friends Are For	B-side to ‘Riding on a Rainbow’ single	1996	Theme to Dawdle the Donkey children's TV show
Forevermore	The Love Songs	1997	"Forevermore" single, Home (acoustic version)
It's Me (and I'm Ready to Go)	The Love Songs	1997	
So Beautiful	The Love Songs	1997	"So Beautiful" single
There's a New Star Up in Heaven Tonight (Princess Diana tribute)	Privately pressed single	1997	The Ultimate Collection, Now and Then
Desperado (Live) (Eagles cover)	Live in Bangkok (Thailand-only album)	1997	Live in Zabrze, Poland - TV broadcast
Friends Forevermore (with Aravon School Choir)	Friends Forevermore (Aravon School Choir album)	2000	
Two Sides to Every Story (with Shelley Nelson)	Notes from Planet Earth	2001	'Two Sides to Every Story' single, Now and Then
Hey Jude (Live) (The Beatles cover)	'Benefit for Volendam' DVD	2001	Much More Than This box set
Ticket to Ride (Live) (The Beatles cover)	'Benefit for Volendam' DVD	2001	Much More Than This box set
Yesterday (Live) (The Beatles cover)	'Benefit for Volendam' DVD	2001	Much More Than This box set
Oh, Pretty Woman (Live) (Roy Orbison cover)	'Benefit for Volendam' DVD	2001	Much More Than This box set
Even Now	The Road to Freedom special edition	2004	B-side to "Five Past Dreams" single
Little Angel	The Road to Freedom special edition	2004	
Kiss Me from a Distance	The Road to Freedom special edition	2004	B-side to "The Words 'I Love You'" single
Once Upon a Time	The Road to Freedom special edition	2004	B-side to "Read My Name" single, Live in Dortmund (live version)
Because I Love You (Demo)	Much More Than This box set	2006	
Bring the Boy Back (Demo)	Much More Than This box set	2006	
Heaven's a Long Way From Here (Demo)	Much More Than This box set	2006	
Nights in White Satin (The Moody Blues cover)	Much More Than This box set	2006	
Day After Day	B-side to ‘One World’ single	2006	
The Seduction of Lady Jane Seymour	B-side to ‘Raging Storm’ single	2007	
The Bells of Christmas	Footsteps special edition	2008	
You'll Never Walk Alone (Rodgers and Hammerstein cover)	Footsteps special edition	2008	"You'll Never Walk Alone" single
Live for the Day (with Tina Yamout)	Now and Then	2008	
Catch the Wind (Donovan cover)	Footsteps 2 special edition	2011	
Moonshadow (Cat Stevens cover)	Footsteps 2 special edition	2011	
Mit 66 Jahren (Udo Jürgens cover)	Mitten im Leben (Udo Jürgens tribute album)	2014	'Life of Udo Jürgens' German TV concert – October 2014
Be My Valentine	50 Years of Music	2024	
On this Day	50 Years of Music	2024	
It's Never Too Late	50 Years of Music	2024	

In addition to the songs listed above, professional live recordings exist of live performances by de Burgh of the following songs.

Title	First appearance	Year	Other appearances
Here Comes the Sun (Live) (The Beatles cover)	BBC Radio 1 'In Concert' 1975	1975	
Remembrance Day (Song for Enniskillen)	The Gay Byrne Radio Show	1987	The Late Late Show TV performance 31 December 1987
Eleanor Rigby (Live) (The Beatles cover)	Live in Zabrze, Poland - TV broadcast	1996	'Take 2 Classic Covers' acoustic TV performance 2015
Hotel California (Live) (Eagles cover)	Live in Poland - TV broadcast	2000	
Psalm 23 (The Lord Is My Shepherd)	BBC Songs of Praise special	2006	
Those Were The Days (Mary Hopkin cover)	Russian TV performance	2019	

== Videography ==
De Burgh has released 7 live concert videos to date. Only the 2010 Footsteps Live DVD is still in print and available to buy new. Most of the videos are not complete concerts, with only the Munich Concerts VHS from 1985 being close to a full concert recording. Most of these videos are available to view on YouTube.

Title	Released	Format(s)	Duration	Description
The Video	1983	VHS	65 minutes	Concert footage from Hamilton Palace in Canada, mixed with interview and rehearsal footage.
The Munich Concerts	1985	VHS	100 minutes	Recorded during his 3 night run in December 1984 in front of a total of 60,000 fans
High on Emotion: Live from Dublin	1990	VHS / Video CD / LaserDisc	81 minutes	Concert footage from Dublin in December 1988. Incomplete concert; shows on this tour were around 125 minutes long
Beautiful Dreams Live	1995/2005	VHS / DVD	90 minutes	Concert footage from Birmingham in December 1995, featuring a solo set and then set with orchestra. Incomplete concert; shows on this tour were around 130 minutes long
Benefit for Volendam	2001	VHS / DVD	88 minutes	Limited edition solo concert release in aid of the Volendam disaster fund. Also includes some interview footage. Total running time of concert unknown.
The Road to Freedom Live	2004	DVD	90 minutes	Filmed in Germany on the solo tour of 2004. Also features 25 minute documentary. Incomplete concert; shows on this tour were 160–180 minutes long.
Footsteps - Live in Concert	2010	DVD	109 minutes	Filmed in Germany on the Footsteps tour of 2009. Incomplete concert; shows on this tour were 165–180 minutes long.
