= Spark to a Flame: The Very Best of Chris de Burgh =

Greatest hits album by Chris de Burgh
- Released: 23 October 1989
- Recorded: Ramport and Scorpio Studios
- Genre: Rock
- Length: 67:58 (68:38 German)
- Label: A&M
- Producer: Chris de Burgh, Rupert Hine, Roy Thomas Baker, Robin Geoffrey Cable, Paul Hardiman and others

Chris de Burgh chronology
Flying Colours (1988)	Spark to a Flame: The Very Best of Chris de Burgh (1989)	High on Emotion: Live from Dublin (1990)

Professional ratings
Review scores
Source	Rating
AllMusic	4.5/5 stars

Spark to a Flame: The Very Best of Chris de Burgh is the third compilation album by Chris de Burgh, released by A&M Records in 1989. The album was released largely to capitalise on the resurgence of de Burgh's career after the smash hit of "The Lady in Red" three years earlier. As a result, most of the tracks are drawn from his 1980s albums The Getaway, Man on the Line, Into the Light, and Flying Colours. Only "Spanish Train" and "A Spaceman Came Travelling" come from de Burgh's early output from the 1970s.

The collection also includes a pairing of the songs "Borderline" and "Say Goodbye to It All" — originally from two different albums — which together tell a story arc of a conscientious objector fleeing to be with his lover.

== Track listing ==
All tracks are written by Chris de Burgh.

UK release
No.	Title	Original album	Length
1.	"This Waiting Heart"	previously unreleased	4:08
2.	"Don't Pay the Ferryman"	The Getaway (1982)	3:24
3.	"Much More Than This"	Man on the Line (1984)	2:55
4.	"Sailing Away"	Flying Colours (1988)	4:58
5.	"The Lady in Red"	Into the Light (1986)	4:17
6.	"Borderline"	The Getaway (1982)	4:33
7.	"Say Goodbye to It All"	Into the Light (1986)	5:04
8.	"Spanish Train"	Spanish Train and Other Stories (1975)	4:47
9.	"Ship to Shore"	The Getaway (1982)	3:47
10.	"Missing You"	Flying Colours (1988)	4:06
11.	"Fatal Hesitation"	Into the Light (1986)	4:14
12.	"Diamond in the Dark"	previously unreleased	3:29
13.	"Tender Hands"	Flying Colours (1988)	4:28
14.	"A Spaceman Came Travelling" (*)	Spanish Train and Other Stories (1975)	5:10
15.	"Where Peaceful Waters Flow"	The Getaway (1982)	3:53
16.	"High on Emotion"	Man on the Line (1984)	4:24

US/Canada release
No.	Title	Original album	Length
1.	"This Waiting Heart"	previously unreleased	4:08
2.	"Don't Pay the Ferryman"	The Getaway (1982)	3:24
3.	"Much More Than This"	Man on the Line (1984)	2:55
4.	"Sailing Away"	Flying Colours (1988)	4:58
5.	"The Lady in Red"	Into the Light (1986)	4:17
6.	"Borderline"	The Getaway (1982)	4:33
7.	"Say Goodbye to It All"	Into the Light (1986)	5:04
8.	"Spanish Train"	Spanish Train and Other Stories (1975)	4:47
9.	"Patricia the Stripper"	Spanish Train and Other Stories (1975)	3:30
10.	"Ship to Shore"	The Getaway (1982)	3:47
11.	"Missing You"	Flying Colours (1988)	4:06
12.	"Diamond in the Dark"	previously unreleased	3:29
13.	"Tender Hands"	Flying Colours (1988)	4:28
14.	"A Spaceman Came Travelling" (*)	Spanish Train and Other Stories (1975)	5:10
15.	"Where Peaceful Waters Flow"	The Getaway (1982)	3:53
16.	"High on Emotion"	Man on the Line (1984)	4:24

German/Australasian release
No.	Title	Original album	Length
1.	"This Waiting Heart"	previously unreleased	4:08
2.	"Don't Pay the Ferryman"	The Getaway (1982)	3:24
3.	"Fire on the Water"	Into the Light (1986)	4:28
4.	"Sailing Away"	Flying Colours (1988)	4:58
5.	"The Lady in Red"	Into the Light (1986)	4:17
6.	"Borderline"	The Getaway (1982)	4:33
7.	"Say Goodbye to It All"	Into the Light (1986)	5:04
8.	"One Word (Straight to the Heart)"	Into the Light (1986)	4:16
9.	"A Spaceman Came Travelling" (*)	Spanish Train and Other Stories (1975)	5:10
10.	"Ship to Shore"	The Getaway (1982)	3:47
11.	"Missing You"	Flying Colours (1988)	4:06
12.	"Diamond in the Dark"	previously unreleased	3:29
13.	"Tender Hands"	Flying Colours (1988)	4:28
14.	"The Getaway"	The Getaway (1982)	3:52
15.	"Where Peaceful Waters Flow"	The Getaway (1982)	3:53
16.	"High on Emotion"	Man on the Line (1984)	4:24

- *The album features the remixed version of "A Spaceman Came Travelling" with a re-rerecorded vocal track; it is subsequently titled "A Spaceman Came Travelling '89" on future compilations.

== Charts ==
Chart (1989)	Peak position
German Albums Chart	2
UK Albums Chart	4
Swiss Albums Chart	3

== Sales and certifications ==
Certifications for Spark to a Flame: The Very Best of Chris de Burgh
Region	Certification	Certified units/sales
Austria (IFPI Austria)	Gold	25,000^{*}
Canada (Music Canada)	Gold	50,000^{^}
Germany (BVMI)	Platinum	500,000^{^}
Switzerland (IFPI Switzerland)	Platinum	50,000^{^}
United Kingdom (BPI)	2× Platinum	600,000^{^}
^{*} Sales figures based on certification alone.^{^} Shipments figures based on certification alone.
