= Notes from Planet Earth – The Ultimate Collection =

Notes from Planet Earth - The Ultimate Collection

Compilation album by Chris de Burgh
- Released: March 19, 2001
- Genre: Pop/rock
- Label: Mercury

Chris de Burgh chronology
The Ultimate Collection (2000)	Notes from Planet Earth - The Ultimate Collection (2001)	Timing Is Everything (2002)

Notes from Planet Earth – The Ultimate Collection is a 2001 compilation album by Chris de Burgh. Mercury Records released it on March 19, 2001. The official Chris de Burgh website shows two different tracklists, one for the UK version and one for the Canadian version, and also notes "Brand new compilation album, featuring the brand new song "Two Sides to Every Story" with Shelley Nelson (Tin Tin Out)."

== Track listings ==
=== UK version ===
1. "Don't Pay the Ferryman"
2. "Missing You 2001"
3. "Fatal Hesitation"
4. "Ship to Shore"
5. "The Lady in Red"
6. "When I Think of You"
7. "Sailing Away"
8. "Two Sides to Every Story" (featuring Shelley Nelson)
9. "Tender Hands"
10. "A Spaceman Came Travelling"
11. "I Want It (And I Want It Now)" (DJ Q-Ball Remix)
12. "Patricia the Stripper 2000"
13. "Borderline"
14. "Say Goodbye to It All"
15. "Where Peaceful Waters Flow"
16. "This Waiting Heart"
17. "High on Emotion"

=== Canadian version ===
1. "Don't Pay the Ferryman"
2. "Missing You 2001"
3. "Ship to Shore"
4. "The Lady in Red"
5. "When I Think of You"
6. "Sailing Away"
7. "Two Sides to Every Story "
8. "Tender Hands"
9. "A Spaceman Came Travelling"
10. "I Want It (And I Want It Now)" (DJ Q-ball Remix)
11. "Borderline"
12. "Say Goodbye to It All"
13. "Where Peaceful Waters Flow"
14. "Spanish Train"
15. "High on Emotion"
16. "Quand Je Pense a Toi"
17. "Le Coeur D'Une Femme"
