= Beautiful Dreams =

Studio album by Chris de Burgh
- Released: 6 November 1995
- Genre: Rock
- Length: 48:41
- Label: A&M
- Producer: Chris de Burgh

Chris de Burgh chronology
This Way Up (1994)	Beautiful Dreams (1995)	The Love Songs (1997)

Professional ratings
Review scores
Source	Rating
Music Week	2/5 stars

Beautiful Dreams is the twelfth album by British-Irish singer-songwriter Chris de Burgh, released in 1995. It is a collection of songs recorded with a full orchestra. It includes a mix of his own songs from previous albums, three new songs and three cover versions.

== Track listing ==
All tracks composed by Chris de Burgh; except where indicated.

No.	Title	Writer(s)	Album	Length
1.	"Missing You"	Chris de Burgh	Flying Colours	3:58
2.	"Girl"	John Lennon, Paul McCartney	Cover Version	2:50
3.	"Carry Me (Like a Fire in Your Heart)"	Chris de Burgh	Flying Colours	4:06
4.	"Discovery"	Chris de Burgh	At the End of a Perfect Day	3:23
5.	"The Snows of New York"	Chris de Burgh, Albert Hammond	This Way Up	3:36
6.	"In Love Forever"	Chris de Burgh	New Song	3:06
7.	"Shine On"	Chris de Burgh	Power of Ten	4:03
8.	"The Lady in Red"	Chris de Burgh	Into the Light	4:10
9.	"In Dreams"	Roy Orbison	Cover Version	3:09
10.	"I'm Not Crying Over You"	Chris de Burgh, Albert Hammond	New Song	3:57
11.	"Always on My Mind"	Johnny Christopher, Mark James, Wayne Carson Thompson	Cover Version	3:22
12.	"Say Goodbye to It All"	Chris de Burgh	Into the Light	4:39
13.	"One More Mile to Go"	Chris de Burgh	New Song	3:32

=== Bonus track listing ===
No.	Title	Writer(s)	Album	Length
14.	"High on Emotion"	Chris de Burgh	Man on the Line	4:24

"In Love Forever", "I'm Not Crying Over You" and "One More Mile to Go" were three new songs written for this album.

"Girl" is missing on compact cassette.

"This is the album I've always wanted to make; a live studio recording of personal favourites, old classics and new songs, with full orchestra and choir. It was recorded in London over a period of eight days (instead of the usual three-four months) in July '95, and to sing each track surrounded by an orchestra, without the benefit of the safety-net of modern technology, was immensely exciting - everything in one take, the way it used to be!"

== Personnel ==
- Chris de Burgh – vocals
- Peter Oxendale – acoustic piano, musical director
- Dave "Clem" Clempson – acoustic guitar, electric guitars
- John Themis – acoustic guitar, guitar soloist
- John Giblin – bass guitar
- Ian Thomas – drums
- Miles Bould – percussion
- Nick Ingman – arrangements and conductor (1, 2, 5, 7–13)
- Richard Hewson – arrangements and conductor (3, 4, 6)
- The London Session Orchestra – orchestra
- Gavyn Wright – orchestra leader
- GWALIA – Welsh Male Voice Choir

Production

- Produced by Chris de Burgh
- Recorded by Ben Darlow and Mike Ross at Whitfield Street Recording Studios (London, England).
- Mixed by Ben Darlow at Nomis Studios (London, England).
- Art Direction and Design – Mike Ross
- Photography – Richard Haughton
- Cover Painting – Fletcher Sibthorp
- Cover Typography – Richard Carroll

== Concert video release ==
In September 2005, de Burgh performed a concert at the Symphony Hall, Birmingham; a 90-minute VHS video of this concert was released as Beautiful Dreams Live. The first half of this concert saw de Burgh perform a solo set of songs from throughout his career. The second half was a performance of tracks from the Beautiful Dreams album, with a full orchestra. It was later released on DVD with bonus behind the scenes footage and music videos.

=== Video track listing ===
Solo set

- "Carry On"
- "Here Is Your Paradise"
- "Transmission Ends"
- "The Head and the Heart"
- "Spanish Train"
- "This Weight on Me"
- "The Simple Truth"
- "The Last Time I Cried"
- "Borderline"
- "Oh, My Brave Hearts"
- "Don't Pay the Ferryman"

Beautiful Dreams set

- "Missing You"
- "Carry Me (Like a Fire in Your Heart)"
- "Discovery"
- "In Love Forever"
- "The Lady in Red"
- "In Dreams"
- "I'm Not Crying Over You"
- "Always on My Mind"
- "Say Goodbye to It All"
- "One More Mile to Go"
- "The Snows of New York"

Note: The tracks "Girl" and "Shine On" from the Beautiful Dreams album are not included in the video but may have been performed at the concert.
