= High on Emotion: Live from Dublin =

Live album by Chris de Burgh
- Released: 10 September 1990
- Genre: Rock
- Length: 73:56
- Label: A&M
- Producer: Chris de Burgh; Gregg Jackman; Kenny Thomson

Chris de Burgh chronology
Spark to a Flame: The Very Best of Chris de Burgh (1989)	High on Emotion: Live from Dublin (1990)	Power of Ten (1992)

Singles from High on Emotion
- 1. "Don't Pay the Ferryman" Released: 13 August 1990

High on Emotion: Live from Dublin is the first live album by Chris de Burgh, released by A&M Records in 1990. The album was recorded at the RDS Simmonscourt, Dublin in December 1988.

The double vinyl and cassette versions of the album featured 17 tracks from the concert. Due to the limitations of the running time of CD, the tracks 'Lonely Sky' and 'The Ballroom of Romance' were omitted from the CD version. These two tracks were included on the CD single release of the live version of 'Don't Pay the Ferryman' which was released to support the album. (This live version of 'The Ballroom of Romance' was also released as a B-side on a Germany-only single of 'Don't Look Back' released in 1989, over a year prior to the release of this album.)

An 81-minute concert film was widely released on VHS cassette in 1990, under the title "Chris de Burgh - Live From Dublin". This included the same track list as the vinyl and cassette releases, however with the track 'The Ballroom of Romance' missing. A very limited release of the video also took place on Laserdisc, a higher quality format.

A number of other songs were performed on this tour but are not included on any these releases. These include "Leather on my Shoes", "One Word (Straight to the Heart)", "A Night on the River", "Where Peaceful Waters Flow" and "The Getaway".

== Track listing ==
All tracks composed by Chris de Burgh

1. "Last Night" - 7:07
2. "Sailing Away" - 5:19
3. "The Revolution" - 4:04
4. "I'm Not Scared Anymore" - 4:42
5. "Spanish Train" - 4:57
6. "Borderline" - 4:51
7. "The Risen Lord" - 3:35
8. "The Last Time I Cried" - 6:16
9. "The Lady in Red" - 4:07
10. "A Spaceman Came Travelling" - 3:43
11. "Patricia the Stripper" - 4:21
12. "Missing You" - 4:26
13. "Say Goodbye to It All" - 5:55
14. "Don't Pay the Ferryman" - 4:15
15. "High on Emotion" - 5:11

== Track listing (compact cassette) ==
Side One

1. "Last Night"
2. "Sailing Away"
3. "The Revolution"
4. "I'm Not Scared Anymore"
5. "Spanish Train"
6. "Borderline"
7. "The Risen Lord"
8. "The Last Time I Cried"

Side Two

1. "The Lady in Red"
2. "Lonely Sky"
3. "A Spaceman Came Travelling"
4. "Patricia The Stripper"
5. "The Ballroom of Romance"
6. "Missing You"
7. "Say Goodbye To It All"
8. "Don't Pay The Ferryman"
9. "High On Emotion"

== Personnel ==
- Chris de Burgh – lead vocals, grand piano, guitars
- Glenn Morrow – keyboards, backing vocals
- Ian Kojima – keyboards, guitars, saxophone, backing vocals
- Danny McBride – lead guitar, backing vocals
- Al Marnie – bass guitar, backing vocals
- Jeff Phillips – drums

== Production ==
- Producers – Chris de Burgh, Gregg Jackman and Kenny Thomson.
- Engineered and Mixed by Gregg Jackman
- Assistant Engineers – Pete Craigie and Gary Stewart
- Recorded on Advison Mobile at RDS Arena (Dublin, Ireland).
- Mix Assistants – Simon Duff and Avril Mackintosh
- Mixed at Marcus Recording Studios (London, England).
- Mastered by Jack Adams at Tape One (London, England).
- Design – Normal Service
- Photography – Colm Henry and Dennis O'Reagan
- Liner Notes – Chris de Burgh
- Management – Dave Margereson and Kenny Thomson at Mismanagement, Inc.

== Sales and certifications ==
Certifications for High on Emotion: Live from Dublin
Region	Certification	Certified units/sales
Germany (BVMI)	Gold	250,000^{^}
Switzerland (IFPI Switzerland)	Gold	25,000^{^}
United Kingdom (BPI)	Gold	100,000^{^}
^{^} Shipments figures based on certification alone.
