= Now and Then (Chris de Burgh album) =

Compilation album by Chris de Burgh
- Released: April 21, 2008
- Genre: Rock; pop
- Length: 1:13:15
- Label: Universal Music TV
- Producer: Various

Chris de Burgh chronology
The Storyman (2006)	Now and Then (2008)	Footsteps (2008)

Professional ratings
Review scores
Source	Rating
AllMusic	3.5/5 stars

Now and Then is a 2008 compilation album by Chris de Burgh, containing many of his greatest hits, plus some album tracks. It was released on UMTV Records on April 21, 2008. "Live For The Day" is a new song not previously released.

== Track listing ==
1. "Don't Pay The Ferryman" – 3:59
2. "Missing You" – 2:51
3. "Lady in Red" – 4:06
4. "Live for the Day" (with Tina Yamout) – 3:27
5. "When I Think of You" – 3:36
6. "A Spaceman Came Travelling" – 3:57
7. "The Words 'I Love You'" – 3:59
8. "Fatal Hesitation" – 4:05
9. "Much More Than This" – 3:10
10. "One World" – 3:15
11. "The Simple Truth (A Child Is Born)" – 3:22
12. "Suddenly Love" – 4:35
13. "Sailing Away" – 3:32
14. "Two Sides to Every Story" (with Shelley Nelson) – 3:29
15. "There's a New Star Up in Heaven Tonight" – 2:51
16. "This Waiting Heart" – 4:06
17. "Borderline" – 3:23
18. "Snows of New York" – 3:36
19. "Say Goodbye to It All" – 3:57
20. "High on Emotion" – 3:59

== Charts ==
Chart (2008)	Peak position
UK Albums (OCC)	12
