= Best Moves =

Greatest hits album by Chris de Burgh
- Released: 1981
- Genre: Rock
- Length: 50:23
- Label: A&M

Chris de Burgh chronology
Eastern Wind (1980)	Best Moves (1981)	The Getaway (1982)

Professional ratings
Review scores
Source	Rating
Record Mirror	4/5 stars

Best Moves is the first compilation album by Chris de Burgh, released by A&M Records in 1981. It includes songs from his first five studio albums as well as new tracks, "Every Drop of Rain" and "Waiting for the Hurricane". It was the first de Burgh album to chart in the UK, entering on 12 September 1981, peaking at number 65 and staying on the chart for four weeks.

== Track listing ==
All songs written by Chris de Burgh.

1. "The Traveller" – 4:09 (from Eastern Wind)
2. "Every Drop of Rain" (previously unreleased) – 3:33
3. "In a Country Churchyard [Let Your Love Shine On]" – 3:52 (from At the End of a Perfect Day)
4. "Patricia the Stripper" – 3:30 (from Spanish Train and Other Stories)
5. "Satin Green Shutters" – 5:02 (from Far Beyond These Castle Walls)
6. "Spanish Train" – 5:00 (from Spanish Train and Other Stories)
7. "Waiting for the Hurricane" (previously unreleased) – 4:11
8. "Broken Wings" (live version) – 3:20 (original version on At the End of a Perfect Day)
9. "Lonely Sky" – 3:52 (from Spanish Train and Other Stories)
10. "A Spaceman Came Travelling" – 5:10 (from Spanish Train and Other Stories)
11. "Crusader" – 8:48 (from Crusader)

== Charts ==
=== Weekly charts ===
Chart (1981–82)	Peak position
German Albums (Offizielle Top 100)	4
Norwegian Albums (VG-lista)	4
Swedish Albums (Sverigetopplistan)	12
UK Albums (Official Charts)	65

=== Year-end charts ===
Chart (1982)	Position
German Albums (Offizielle Top 100)	6
Chart (1983)	Position
German Albums (Offizielle Top 100)	25

== Certifications and sales ==
Region	Certification	Certified units/sales
Canada (Music Canada)	Gold	50,000^{^}
Germany (BVMI)	Gold	250,000^{^}
^{^} Shipments figures based on certification alone.
