= The Love Songs (Chris de Burgh album) =

Greatest hits album by Chris de Burgh
- Released: 29 September 1997
- Genre: Rock
- Length: 64:34
- Label: A&M
- Producer: Pete Smith; Chris de Burgh; Paul Hardiman; Rupert Hine; Robin Geoffrey Cable; Peter Oxendale

Chris de Burgh chronology
Beautiful Dreams (1995)	The Love Songs (1997)	Quiet Revolution (1999)

The Love Songs is the fourth compilation album by Chris de Burgh, released by A&M Records in 1997. Three new tracks are included in addition to songs found on previous albums, several of which were re-recorded for this release.

== Track listing ==
All songs written by Chris de Burgh.

1. "Here Is Your Paradise" - 3:29
2. "Missing You" - 4:09
3. "So Beautiful" (previously unreleased) - 3:49
4. "In Love Forever" (new recording) - 4:02
5. "Borderline" - 4:37
6. "The Lady in Red" - 4:16
7. "Much More Than This" - 2:56
8. "It's Me (And I'm Ready To Go)" (previously unreleased) - 6:09
9. "Separate Tables" (new recording) - 3:39
10. "Fatal Hesitation" - 4:15
11. "Forevermore" (previously unreleased) - 4:19
12. "The Head and the Heart" - 4:00
13. "Lonely Sky" (new remix) - 3:54
14. "Suddenly Love" - 3:14
15. "If You Really Love Her, Let Her Go" (new recording) - 3:33
16. "In a Country Churchyard" (new recording) - 4:02

== Personnel ==
- Pete Smith – producer (1)
- Chris de Burgh – producer (2–4, 8, 9, 11, 14)
- Paul Hardiman – producer (2–4, 6, 8–11, 14, 16), arrangements (3, 4, 8, 9, 11)
- Rupert Hine – producer (5, 7, 12)
- Robin Geoffrey Cable – producer (13)
- Ben Darlow – remixing (13)
- Peter Oxendale – remixing (13), producer (15, 16), arrangements (15, 16)
- Lester Mendez – arrangements (3, 4, 8, 9, 11)
- Art Murphy – illustration
- Mike Gowell – photography
- Ryan Art – sleeve design
- Kenny Thomson – management

== Charts ==
Chart (2013)	Peak position
South African Albums (RISA)	18
