= A Woman's Heart =

A Woman's Heart may refer to:

- A Woman's Heart (compilation album), 1992, by six female Irish artists
- A Woman's Heart (Crystal Gayle album), 1980
- "A Woman's Heart", a single by Chris de Burgh from the 1999 album Quiet Revolution
- A Woman's Heart (film), a 1926 American silent melodrama film

== See also ==
- Heart of a Woman (disambiguation)
- "In a Woman's Heart", a 1996 Eurovision Song Contest entry by Miriam Christine
- "Only a Woman's Heart", a 1992 song by Eleanor McEvoy
