= The Very Best of Chris de Burgh =

Greatest hits album by Chris de Burgh
- Released: December 1984
- Genre: Rock
- Label: Telstar Records

Chris de Burgh chronology
Man on the Line (1984)	The Very Best of Chris de Burgh (1984)	Into the Light (1986)

The Very Best of Chris de Burgh is the second compilation album by Chris de Burgh, released by Telstar Records in 1984.

== Track listing ==
All songs written by Chris de Burgh.

Side One

1. "Don't Pay the Ferryman"
2. "The Ecstasy of Flight"
3. "The Traveller"
4. "Ship to Shore"
5. "Flying Home"
6. "Satin Green Shutters" – alternately "Spanish Train"
7. "A Spaceman Came Travelling"

Side Two

1. "Spanish Train" – alternately "The Lady in Red"
2. "High on Emotion"
3. "Borderline"
4. "Lonely Sky"
5. "In a Country Churchyard"
6. "Patricia the Stripper"
7. "Waiting for the Hurricane"

== Charts ==
Date	Peak position	Chart
29 December 1984	6	UK Albums (OCC)
