= Kristyna Myles =

- Born: 10 May 1984 (age 42); Leicester, England
- Genres: Pop, soul
- Occupation: Singer-songwriter
- Instrument: Vocals
- Years active: 2005–present
- Label: Take Note Recordings
- Website: www.kristynamyles.com

Kristyna Myles (born 10 May 1984) is a MOBO nominated British singer-songwriter who is currently based in Manchester. Originally from Leicestershire, she came into prominence after winning Busk Idol, a 2005 nationwide singing competition organised by BBC Radio 5 Live. Since winning, she has featured on albums by Chris de Burgh and Rick Guard, and has performed on television programmes such as Songs of Praise, Wogan Now & Then and Play It Again. She also sang a duet with de Burgh on his European tour. In 2009, she was nominated for a MOBO award as part of gospel act DTWG : Desire To Worship God and most recently nominated for a MOBO for her own music in 2014.

== Life and music career ==
=== 1984–2002: Early life ===
Myles was born and raised in Leicestershire. She attended Thomas Estley Community College in Broughton Astley before moving up to Lutterworth Grammar School (now Lutterworth College) at age 14. She studied Flute with Elizabeth Hextall {Black Rat} and later recorded the Black Rat track 'Jane' which was on the album 'Rich Pickings' Her first experience of the music industry came when she was 16 years old, when she was invited by Basement Jaxx to audition for the lead vocals in their single "Romeo". In 2002 she was accepted into the University of Salford, where she studied Popular Music and Recording and was in the same year as Manchester bands Delphic and Everything Everything.

=== 2003–2007: Busk Idol and Chris de Burgh ===
While studying at university, Myles formed a band and won a national songwriting competition. This led to her having her song "Thank You" released as a single in the Netherlands and performing in Amsterdam for the launch party. After graduating, she busked on Market Street, Manchester, before representing the city on BBC Radio 5 Live's Busk Idol competition in 2005, which she went on to win with her guitarist Ben Williams.

By winning Busk Idol, Myles then signed to manager Perry Hughes who change things in her career through to 2013 he started by introducing her to British singer Chris de Burgh, who invited her to record a duet entitled "Raging Storm" with him at London's Abbey Road Studios, for his latest album The Storyman. Myles performed the song with de Burgh at one of his concerts at the NEC Arena in Birmingham in 2006 and on the television show Wogan Now & Then. She was subsequently offered an opening slot on nine dates of de Burgh's 2006 European tour, which saw her perform in cities such as Frankfurt, Munich and Amsterdam.

"My Lord"
"My Lord" from One of a Kind made use of brass accompaniment and a backing choir.

Later that year, Myles featured on an Manchester-themed episode of the BBC show Songs of Praise, where she performed her own composition "My Lord". In January 2007, Myles returned to the city centre of Manchester to help guitarist Andy Rourke and the annual charity concert Versus Cancer set a world record for largest group busk then, in April, performed with de Burgh and singer Aled Jones on the television programme Play It Again. She released her debut EP, One of a Kind, as a digital download through Roots Music Group in 2007, which featured four original compositions: "One of a Kind", "My Lord", "Setback" and "Sunshine". Myles also featured on the track "Sense of Purpose" from the EP The Bells of St Mary by British band Detours, which was also used on their studio album Sense of Purpose.

=== 2008–2011 ===
During 2008, Myles was the only unsigned artist to feature on the Universal Music compilation album Songbird 2008, with "My Lord", a track from One of a Kind. In July she supported Mick Hucknall on part of his UK tour, playing at venues such as Echo Arena Liverpool and in October she performed at Oxjam events in Lancaster, Lancashire, alongside Joe De Luca and Mike Dignam. During the next year she recorded a duet named "Making Movies" with jazz singer Rick Guard for his 2009 album Anyone But Me. That August, Myles was nominated for Best Gospel Act at the MOBO Awards 2009 as part of the gospel collective DTWG : Desire To Worship God, but lost out to Victizzle.

Myles has been performing at venues and festivals across the UK and Europe throughout 2010 and 2011. She played at the South by Southwest festival in Austin, Texas in March and featured on BBC Radio Manchester in May.

=== 2010–2012 ===
Perry Hughes signed Myles to a 5-album deal with DECCA Records and recorded her debut album with Grammy Award Winning Producer Ken Nelson (Coldplay, Paolo Nutini) A first single from the album called I'm Not Going Back was released in Spring 2012. Kristyna performed the single live on Channel 5 'Live With Mylene' and announced the busking tour across the UK to raise funds and awareness for homeless charity Centrepoint. Kristyna also performed live on BBC Radio 4 and at Kew Gardens opening for Will Young, M People, Nile Rodgers, Tim Minchin and supported Ben Montague on his UK Tour.

=== 2013–2015 ===
Despite being signed to a major record company in 2010 and having completed the first of a five-album deal, just one single release in three years saw exhilaration turn to exasperation, providing the motivation for Kristyna to take back control of her career and copyrights, parting company with management and label. It was a brave move that has since been vindicated by sales and praise for 'The Paris Match', co-produced by legendary Style Council drummer Steve White and Mercury Prize nominated producer Andy Ross and described by modfather Paul Weller as "absolutely stunning".

In 2015, Myles released her second studio album, 'Paint A Brighter Day'. Recorded with Mercury Prize nominated producer Andy Ross, 'Paint A Brighter Day' features 11 songs about life-lessons with the aim of inspiring and painting listeners' days brighter. Paint A Brighter Day' was released thanks to a successful campaign on PledgeMusic which enabled Kristyna to fund the album and video with support from music fans. This was rewarded with a variety of opportunities, including visits to the recording sessions and parts in the video for first single 'I'm Getting Rid of This'. This unique strategy not only enabled Kristyna to fund the project without major label investment, but also interact and engage with existing and new fans at the same time.

The soulful singer/songwriter has recently appeared on BBC 1 Songs of Praise performing "Heaven Knows" written together with Jess Cook which is featured on Paint A Brighter Day her forthcoming album. The Sunday Hour on BBC Radio 2 gave "Heaven Knows"’ its first play.

"In short, she is a must see talent" METRO "Soulful and distinctive" M.E.N Newspaper "Kristyna (Myles) isn't interested in being seen as the next 'cool' thing, instead, she's intent on producing soulful, thoughtful and powerful music that simply satisfies" Chris Long, BBC.

== Discography ==
=== Extended plays ===
| Year | Album details |
|---|---|
| 2007 | One of a Kind: Released: 2007; Label: Roots Music Group; Format: Digital download |
| 2014 | Pinch Me Quick: Released: 2014; Label: Take Note Recordings; Format: Digital download CD |

=== Other appearances ===
The following songs have been officially released, but do not feature on an album by Myles.

| Year | Song | Album | Notes |
|---|---|---|---|
| 2006 | "Raging Storm" | The Storyman | Duet with Chris de Burgh |
| 2007 | "Sense of Purpose" | The Bells of St Mary | Collaboration with Detours |
| 2008 | "Forever Grateful" | The Project | Collaboration with DTWG : Desire To Worship God |
| 2008 | "Jane" | Rich Pickings | Collaboration with Black Rat |
| 2009 | "Making Movies" | Anyone But Me | Duet with Rick Guard |

== See also ==
- List of Decca Records artists
