= Footsteps 2 =

Studio album by Chris de Burgh
- Released: 2011
- Studio: British Grove and Stanley House (London, UK)
- Genre: Pop
- Length: 49:38
- Label: Ferryman Productions
- Producer: Chris de Burgh; Chris Porter

Chris de Burgh chronology
Moonfleet & Other Stories (2010)	Footsteps 2 (2011)	Home (2012)

Footsteps 2 is British singer-songwriter Chris de Burgh's nineteenth album. It was released in Germany, Switzerland and Austria on 14 October 2011, and in the UK and Ireland on 17 October 2011.

Footsteps 2 follows the concept with that of Footsteps, creating cover versions of the songs which have inspired him over the years, along with a few new compositions.

As de Burgh said upon releasing Footsteps, "Listening to the great songwriters was the inspiration for me to try and become a good songwriter myself," he says. "I’m talking about the likes of Lennon & McCartney and Bob Dylan; people as good as that just don’t seem to exist any more. I learned my trade, my craft, almost at the feet of the Great Masters. And that is my musical journey. Those songs are my footsteps."

This album peaked at number 10 in the German album chart, and reached number 38 in the UK Albums Chart.

== Track listing ==
No.	Title	Writer(s)	Original artist	Length
1.	"While You See a Chance"	Steve Winwood; Will Jennings	Steve Winwood	4:58
2.	"Let It Be"	Paul McCartney; John Lennon	The Beatles	4:07
3.	"The Living Years"	Mike Rutherford; B. A. Robertson	Mike and the Mechanics	5:37
4.	"Blue Bayou"	Orbison; Joe Melson	Roy Orbison	2:40
5.	"SOS"	Björn Ulvaeus; Benny Andersson; Stig Anderson	ABBA	3:21
6.	"Seven Bridges"	Helmut Richter; Ulrich Swillms; de Burgh	Karat (band)	3:53
7.	"Lady Madonna"	Lennon; McCartney	The Beatles	2:21
8.	"Time in a Bottle"	Jim Croce	Jim Croce	2:33
9.	"Already There"	de Burgh		3:46
10.	"In the Ghetto"	Mac Davis; Elvis Presley	Elvis Presley	3:46
11.	"Long Train Running"	Tom Johnston	The Doobie Brothers	3:39
12.	"On a Christmas Night"	de Burgh		3:33
13.	"Catch the Wind" (Special Edition only)	Donovan	Donovan	2:14
14.	"Moonshadow" (Special Edition only)	Cat Stevens	Cat Stevens	3:01
15.	"Every Step of the Way"	de Burgh		3:18
16.	"The Footsteps 2 Theme"	de Burgh		1:57

A version of the album released by Sony Music in Denmark has a different running order and includes a 25th anniversary version of "The Lady in Red", unavailable elsewhere.

== Personnel ==
- Chris de Burgh – vocals, guitars
- Nigel Hopkins – keyboards, orchestral arrangements, backing vocals
- Phil Palmer – guitars, backing vocals
- Ed Poole – bass, backing vocals
- Geoff Dugmore – drums, percussion, hammered dulcimer
- Jakko Jakszyk – harmonica, backing vocals
- Gavin Fitzjohn – horns, horn arrangements
- Geoffrey Richardson – strings, string arrangements
- Suzanne Barbieri – backing vocals
- Django Jakszyk – backing vocals
- Vula Malinga – backing vocals

Production

- Chris de Burgh – producer, sleeve design
- Chris Porter – producer, engineer, mixing
- Jason Elliott – additional engineer
- Joe Kearns – additional engineer
- Alex Hutchinson – art direction
- Sarah Fulford – sleeve design, photography
- Kenny Thomson – sleeve design, management
- David Morley – photography

== Charts ==
=== Weekly charts ===
Chart (2011–12)	Peak position
Austrian Albums (Ö3 Austria)	44
Danish Albums (Hitlisten)	12
German Albums (Offizielle Top 100)	10
Swiss Albums (Schweizer Hitparade)	3

=== Year-end charts ===
Chart (2011)	Position
German Albums (Offizielle Top 100)	62
Chart (2012)	Position
Swiss Albums (Schweizer Hitparade)	67
