= Timing Is Everything =

Timing Is Everything may refer to:

- Timing Is Everything (album), a 2002 album by Chris de Burgh
- Timing Is Everything (TMNT 2003)
- Timing Is Everything, a 2018 extended play by Steven Lee Olsen
- "Timing Is Everything", a song by Lights from Siberia, 2011
