= The Road to Freedom =

The Road to Freedom may refer to:

- The Road to Freedom (Chris de Burgh album), 2004
- The Road to Freedom (L. Ron Hubbard album), 1986
- Road to Freedom (album), by Young Disciples, 1991
- The Road to Freedom (film), a 2010 American-Cambodian war film
- Road to Freedom (journal), a 1924–1932 American anarchist monthly
- The Road to Freedom (newspaper), a 1919–1920 Russian/Ukrainian anarchist newspaper published by adherents of the Makhnovshchina

== See also ==
- The Roads to Freedom, a novel cycle by Jean-Paul Sartre
