= Moonfleet =

Moonfleet may refer to:

- Moonfleet (novel), a 1898 novel by J. Meade Falkner
- Moonfleet (film), a 1955 film directed by Fritz Lang, inspired by the novel
- Moonfleet (1984 TV series), a British period television drama series, based on the novel
- Moonfleet (2013 TV series), a British period television drama series, based on the novel

== See also ==
- Moonfleet & Other Stories, a 2010 album by Chris de Burgh
