= Heart of a Woman =

Heart of a Woman or The Heart of a Woman may refer to:

== Books ==
- The Heart of a Woman, a 1981 autobiography by Maya Angelou
- The Heart of a Woman, or A True Woman, a 1911 novel by Baroness Orczy
- Heart of a Woman, a 1912 poetry collection by Georgia Douglas Johnson

== Film and TV ==
- Heart of a Woman, or Kalb el mar'a, a 1940 film starring Amina Rizk
- The Heart of a Woman, a 1920 film starring Mignon Anderson

== Music ==
- Heart of a Woman (album), a 1999 album by Etta James
- The Heart of a Woman (album), a 1974 album by Johnny Mathis
- The Heart of a Woman, a 2000 album by Kathie Lee Gifford
- "Heart of a Woman" (song), a 2024 song by Summer Walker

== See also ==
- A Woman's Heart (disambiguation)
- From the Heart of a Woman, a 1981 album by Koko Taylor
- The Heart of Woman, a Taiwanese TV series
- "In the Heart of a Woman", a 1993 song by Billy Ray Cyrus
