= Footsteps (album) =

Studio album by Chris de Burgh
- Released: 2008
- Studio: British Grove Studios and Stanley House Studios (London, UK)
- Genre: Rock
- Length: 58:14
- Label: Edel
- Producer: Chris de Burgh; Chris Porter

Chris de Burgh chronology
Now and Then (2008)	Footsteps (2008)	Moonfleet & Other Stories (2010)

Footsteps is singer-songwriter Chris de Burgh's seventeenth album, released in 2008. This album includes two songs penned by de Burgh and cover versions of thirteen other songs that inspired and influenced him throughout his career. The cover versions include well-known songs by bands and artists like the Beatles, Bob Dylan, Toto and Pete Seeger. In 2011, de Burgh released a follow-up album, Footsteps 2.

The album was released in Germany, Switzerland, Austria, Poland, Russia and Ukraine on 21 November 2008, and in the UK in April 2009.

== Track listing ==
No.	Title	Writer(s)	Original artist	Length
1.	"First Steps"	Chris de Burgh		1:09
2.	"Turn, Turn, Turn"	Pete Seeger	Pete Seeger	3:29
3.	"The Long and Winding Road"	John Lennon; Paul McCartney	The Beatles	3:34
4.	"Africa"	David Paich; Jeff Porcaro	Toto	4:15
5.	"Without You"	Peter Ham; Thomas Evans	Badfinger	3:21
6.	"Where Have All the Flowers Gone?"	Pete Seeger	Pete Seeger	3:43
7.	"Sealed with a Kiss"	Gary Geld	The Four Voices	2:36
8.	"Blackbird"	Lennon; McCartney	The Beatles	2:24
9.	"We Can Work It Out"	Lennon; McCartney		2:12
10.	"All Along the Watchtower"	Bob Dylan	Bob Dylan	3:18
11.	"Corrina Corrina"	Bo Chatmon, J. Mayo Williams, Mitchell Parish	Charlie McCoy and Bo Chatman	2:47
12.	"Rhythm of the Rain/Crying in the Rain" (UK version only)	John Gummoe; Carole King; Howard Greenfield	The Cascades/The Everly Brothers	3:08
13.	"Polly Von"	Traditional	Peter, Paul and Mary	3:12
14.	"American Pie"	Don McLean	Don McLean	4:22
15.	"The Last Thing on My Mind"	Tom Paxton	Tom Paxton	3:27
16.	"The Bells of Christmas" (Special Edition only)	de Burgh		2:52
17.	"You'll Never Walk Alone" (Special Edition only)	Richard Rodgers; Oscar Hammerstein II		2:49
18.	"Footsteps"	de Burgh		3:01

== Charts and certifications ==
=== Year-end charts ===
Chart (2009)	Rank
German Albums Chart	38

Country	Certifications	Sales/Shipments
Germany	Platinum	200,000+

== Personnel ==
- Chris de Burgh – vocals, guitars
- Peter Gordeno – keyboards, backing vocals
- Chris Cameron – acoustic piano, orchestra arrangements and conductor (3, 5, 6, 18)
- Nigel Hopkins – keyboards (16)
- Phil Palmer – guitars
- Neil Taylor – guitars
- Hubie Davison – additional guitars (8)
- Jerry Meehan – bass guitar
- Geoff Dugmore – drums, percussion
- The Royal Philharmonic Orchestra – orchestra (3, 5, 6, 18)
- Geoffrey Richardson – string quartet (13, 16, 17)
- Jakko Jakszyk – backing vocals
- Reclaim the Kop Choir – choir (17)

Production

- Chris de Burgh – producer, sleeve design, sleeve notes
- Chris Porter – producer, engineer, mixing
- Joe Kearns – additional engineer
- Alex Hutchinson – art direction
- SJ Johnson – sleeve design
- Kenny Thomson – sleeve design, management
- David Morley – photography
- Russell Kord – front cover photography
