= The Hands of Man =

Studio album by Chris de Burgh
- Released: 20 October 2014
- Studios: British Grove and Stanley House (London, UK)
- Genre: Pop
- Length: 55:27
- Label: Rockware
- Producers: Chris Porter; Chris de Burgh

Chris de Burgh chronology
Home (2012)	The Hands of Man (2014)	A Better World (2016)

The Hands of Man is singer-songwriter Chris de Burgh's twentieth studio album, released in 2014.

De Burgh announced during his Live in Concert 2013 tour that he had completed work on his 20th studio album, entitled "The Hands of Man". Briefly describing the title, de Burgh explained that "hands can perform miracles, they can save lives and end lives". The album uses this concept as a basis for the themes of the album's songs. Following this introduction, de Burgh went on to play the unreleased "The Fields of Agincourt", a song which takes inspiration from the 15th century Battle of Agincourt, between the English & French.

The album was released on 26 September 2014 in mainland Europe. It peaked at number 8 in the German album chart, and reached number 71 in the UK Albums Chart.

== Track listing ==
All songs written by Chris de Burgh.

Sunrise

1. "The Hands of Man" - 4:46
2. "There Goes My Heart Again" - 3:24
3. "Big City Sundays" - 3:26
4. "Where Would I Be?" - 4:01
5. "The Ghost of Old King Richard" - 2:55
6. "The Candlestick" - 3:42
7. "Through These Eyes" - 3:02
8. "The Keeper of the Keys" - 4:55
9. "Meridiem" - 2:09

Sunset

1. "Letting Go" - 3:19
2. "When the Dream Is Over" - 3:36
3. "Empty Rooms" - 3:37
4. "The Bridge" - 4:21
5. "The Fields of Agincourt" - 5:05
6. "One More Goodbye" - 3:17

== Personnel ==
- Chris de Burgh – vocals, acoustic piano, guitars
- Nigel Hopkins – keyboards, orchestrations
- Phil Palmer – guitars
- Neil Taylor – guitars
- Geoffrey Richardson – tenor banjo, viola, violin
- Ed Poole – bass guitar
- Geoff Dugmore – drums
- Jay Craig – bass clarinet
- Mark White – trumpet
- Jakko Jakszyk – backing vocals
- Ffion Wilkins – backing vocals

Production

- Chris de Burgh – producer, sleeve design
- Chris Porter – producer, recording, engineer, mixing
- Jason Elliott – engineer
- Joe Kearns – engineer
- Ian Lloyd-Bisley – technical assistant, logistics
- Alex Hutchinson – art direction
- Sarah Fulford – art direction, sleeve design, photography
- Kenny Thomson – sleeve design, management
- Dave Morley – photography
