= Quiet Revolution (album) =

Studio album by Chris de Burgh
- Released: September 1999
- Studio: Whitfield Street Recording Studios (London, UK)
- Genre: Rock
- Length: 62:50
- Label: A&M
- Producer: Chris de Burgh; Chris Porter

Chris de Burgh chronology
| The Love Songs (1997) | Quiet Revolution (1999) | The Ultimate Collection (2000) |

Not to be confused with Ronny Jordan's 1993 second album.

Professional ratings
Review scores
| Source | Rating |
|---|---|
| AllMusic | 2/5 stars |

Quiet Revolution is the thirteenth studio album by British-Irish singer Chris de Burgh, released in 1999. Two singles were released from the album: "When I Think of You", which reached number 59 in the UK Singles Chart and number 75 in Germany, and "A Woman's Heart", which reached number 96 in Germany.

== Track listing ==
All tracks written by Chris de Burgh.

| No. | Title | Length |
|---|---|---|
| 1. | "When I Think of You" | 3:23 |
| 2. | "Love of the Heart Divine" | 4:56 |
| 3. | "Living in the World" | 4:46 |
| 4. | "The Same Sun" | 5:03 |
| 5. | "Nothing Ever Happens Round Here" | 3:39 |
| 6. | "A Woman's Heart" | 3:36 |
| 7. | "The Last Moments of the Dawn" | 3:20 |
| 8. | "I See You Everywhere" | 4:03 |
| 9. | "Saint Peter's Gate" | 5:05 |
| 10. | "You Look Beautiful" | 3:41 |
| 11. | "I Want It, (And I Want It Now!)" | 4:17 |
| 12. | "Natasha Dance" | 3:55 |
| 13. | "The Rivers of Abraham" | 4:06 |
| 14. | "My Lover Is" | 4:06 |
| 15. | "Quiet Revolution" | 4:29 |

Note

- "When I Think of You" ("Quand Je Pense A Toi") and "A Woman's Heart" ("Le Coeur D'Une Femme") were recorded in French for release in Canada.

== Personnel ==
- Chris de Burgh – lead vocals, backing vocals
- Peter Gordeno – keyboards
- Phil Palmer – guitars
- Neil Taylor – guitars
- John Giblin – bass
- David Levy – bass
- Tony Kiley – drums
- Andy Duncan – drum programming, percussion
- Chris White – saxophones
- Neil Sidwell – trombone
- Steve Sidwell – trumpet
- Chris Cameron – string arrangements (4, 15)
- Richard Hewson – string arrangements (7, 10)
- Peter Oxendale – orchestral agent
- Gavyn Wright – orchestral agent
- The Heart of England Philharmonic – orchestra (4, 7, 10, 15)
- Tommy Blaize – backing vocals
- Hazel Fernandez – backing vocals
- Derek Green – backing vocals
- Helen Hampton – backing vocals
- Katie Kissoon – backing vocals
- Chris Porter – backing vocals

Production

- Chris de Burgh – producer
- Chris Porter – producer, engineer, mixing
- Jason Clift – engineer, mixing
- Andrew Nicholls – assistant engineer
- Ian Lloyd-Bisley – studio manager
- Tom Bird – art direction
- Rick Lecoat – sleeve design
- Paul Cox – photography
- Claire Todd – stylist
- Alison Butler – grooming

== Charts ==
| Chart (1999) | Peak position |
|---|---|
| Dutch Albums (Album Top 100) | 45 |
| German Albums (Offizielle Top 100) | 6 |
| Scottish Albums (OCC) | 45 |
| Swiss Albums (Schweizer Hitparade) | 10 |
| UK Albums (OCC) | 23 |
