= The Storyman =

Studio album by Chris de Burgh
- Released: 2006
- Studio: Metropolis and Abbey Road (London, UK)
- Genre: Rock
- Length: 58:14
- Label: Edel
- Producer: Chris de Burgh; Chris Porter

Chris de Burgh chronology
The Road to Freedom (2004)	The Storyman (2006)	Now and Then (2008)

The Storyman is singer Chris de Burgh's 16th original album, released in 2006. The album is a collection of songs with accompanying stories. The original digipack release of the album included two booklets; one contained the usual lyrics and credits, while the second contained stories written by de Burgh to accompany each song.

The lyrics of the title track contain multiple references to previous songs and albums from de Burgh's career, in chronological order.

== Track listing ==
1. "The Storyman Theme" – 4:00
2. "One World" – 3:56
3. "Leningrad" – 5:12
4. "My Father's Eyes" – 4:18
5. "The Grace of a Dancer" – 6:13
6. "Spirit" – 4:16
7. "The Shadow of the Mountain" – 4:19
8. "Raging Storm" – 4:18 (featuring Kristyna Myles)
9. "The Mirror of the Soul" – 9:15
10. "The Sweetest Kiss of All" – 3:13
11. "The Storyman" – 4:37
12. "My Father's Eyes" (Chris de Burgh with Hani Hussein) – 4:35

All compositions by Chris de Burgh.

== Personnel ==
- Chris de Burgh – vocals, keyboards, guitars
- Richard Cardwell – keyboards
- Peter Gordeno – additional keyboards
- Pete Murray – additional keyboards
- Chris Cameron – acoustic piano, orchestral arrangements and conductor
- Phil Palmer – guitars
- Michael Féat – bass guitar
- Geoff Dugmore – drums, percussion
- Pandit Dinesh – percussion
- Nick Ingman – orchestral conductor
- The Royal Philharmonic Orchestra – orchestra
- Hani Hussein – vocals on "My Father's Eyes"
- Kristyna Myles – vocals on "Raging Storm"
- The Mahotella Queens – vocals
- The London Russian Choir and The Marlborough College Chamber Choir – choirs
- Ian Sutcliffe – director and arrangements for The Marlborough College Chamber Choir.
- Lidya Reinski – director and arrangements for The London Russian Choir.

Production

- Chris de Burgh – producer, sleeve design
- Chris Porter – producer, engineer, mixing
- Andrew Dudman – additional engineer (orchestra)
- Rohan Onraet – additional engineer (band tracks)
- David Morley – photography
- Brett Colledge – art direction
- Mike McCraith – art direction
- Caroline McCrink – sleeve design
- Kenny Thomson – sleeve design, management
