= A Better World (album) =

Studio album by Chris de Burgh
- Released: 23 September 2016
- Genre: Pop
- Length: 49:53
- Label: Rockware
- Producer: Chris de Burgh; Chris Porter

Chris de Burgh chronology
The Hands of Man (2014)	A Better World (2016)	The Legend of Robin Hood (2021)

A Better World is singer-songwriter Chris de Burgh's twenty-first studio album, released on 23 September 2016.

This album peaked at number 7 in the German album chart, and reached number 60 in the UK Albums Chart. It also charted in Switzerland, Belgium, Austria and the Netherlands.

== Track listing ==
All songs written by Chris de Burgh.

1. "Hope in the Human Heart" - 0:54
2. "Bethlehem" - 4:12
3. "Once in a Lifetime" - 3:44
4. "The Open Door" - 3:50
5. "Heart and Soul" - 2:44
6. "Chain of Command" - 3:38
7. "Confession" - 3:00
8. "Homeland" - 4:32
9. "Cry No More" - 3:07
10. "Shipboard Romance" - 2:56
11. "Falling Rain" - 3:08
12. "All For Love" - 3:59
13. "Hold On (I'm On My Way)" - 2:49
14. "The Land of the Free" - 3:34
15. "The Soldier" - 3:46

== Personnel ==
- Chris de Burgh – vocals, acoustic piano, guitars
- Nigel Hopkins – keyboards, orchestrations
- Graham Kearns – guitars
- Phil Palmer – guitars
- Jennifer Maidman – dobro, mandolin, ukulele, bass guitar
- Danny Cummings – drums, percussion
- Mark White – trumpet, flugelhorn
- Geoffrey Richardson – violin
- Jakko Jakszyk – backing vocals
- Ffion Wilkins – backing vocals

=== Production ===
- Chris de Burgh – producer, sleeve design
- Chris Porter – producer, recording, mixing
- Oli Jacobs – engineer
- Patrick Phillips – recording assistant
- Alex Hutchinson – art direction, sleeve design
- Kelly Pepper – sleeve design
- Harley-Moon Kemp – photography
- Kenny Thomson – management
