= Home (Chris de Burgh album) =

Studio album by Chris de Burgh
- Released: 7 October 2012
- Recorded: June 2012
- Studio: Chris de Burgh's home studio, Enniskerry, Ireland
- Length: 47:41
- Label: Ferryman Productions
- Producer: Chris de Burgh; Chris Porter

Chris de Burgh chronology
Footsteps 2 (2011)	Home (2012)	The Hands of Man (2014)

Professional ratings
Review scores
Source	Rating
AllMusic	3/5 stars

Home is a 2012 album by Irish singer-songwriter Chris de Burgh. The album features acoustic re-recordings of 14 lesser-known songs from de Burgh's back catalogue. It was recorded during June 2012 in de Burgh's home studio in Enniskerry in County Wicklow, Ireland.

== Track listing ==
All songs written by Chris de Burgh.

1. "Waiting for the Hurricane" – 2:59
2. "Tender Hands" – 3:59
3. "Fatal Hesitation" – 3:30
4. "Love & Time" – 4:10
5. "Sailor" – 4:03
6. "Living on the Island" – 2:51
7. "It's Such a Long Way Home" – 3:04
8. "Where We Will Be Going" – 4:19
9. "Forevermore" – 3:20
10. "Fire on the Water" – 3:03
11. "Suddenly Love" – 3:12
12. "I Will" – 3:10
13. "I'm Not Scared Anymore" – 3:43
14. "Goodnight" – 2:18
15. "Last Night" (Limited Edition only) – 4:38
16. "Carry On" (Limited Edition only) – 4:17

"Last Night" and "Carry On" are included as bonus tracks on a limited-edition version of the album released in Germany.

An "Amazon Exclusive" version of the album available for streaming or download includes "Last Night" as a bonus track.

== Personnel ==
Credits adapted from album liner notes.

- Chris de Burgh – vocals, acoustic piano, guitars
- Nigel Hopkins – keyboards, accordion, string arrangements
- Phil Palmer – guitars
- Neil Taylor – guitars
- David Levy – bass guitar
- Tony Kiley – percussion
- Steve Sidwell – trumpet
- Chris Porter – backing vocals

Production

- Chris de Burgh – producer, sleeve design
- Chris Porter – producer, engineer, mixing
- Alex Hutchinson – art direction
- Sarah Fulford – art direction, sleeve design, photography
- Kenny Thomson – sleeve design, photography, management

== Weekly charts ==
Chart (2012)	Peak position
Austrian Albums (Ö3 Austria)	48
Belgian Albums (Ultratop Wallonia)	199
German Albums (Offizielle Top 100)	15
Swiss Albums (Schweizer Hitparade)	19
UK Albums (OCC)	92
UK Independent Albums (OCC)	16
