= Eastern Wind =

Studio album by Chris de Burgh
- Released: July 1980
- Genre: Rock
- Length: 38:36
- Label: A&M
- Producer: David Anderle

Chris de Burgh chronology
Crusader (1979)	Eastern Wind (1980)	Best Moves (1981)

Eastern Wind is singer/songwriter Chris de Burgh's fifth studio album, released in 1980. It did not make the UK Albums Chart or Billboard 200, but reached No. 1 in Norway in May 1981, and was at the time the second best-selling album in Norway after Abbey Road by the Beatles.

== Track listing ==
All songs written by Chris de Burgh

1. "The Traveller" – 4:11
2. "The Record Company Bash" – 3:54
3. "Tonight" – 3:28
4. "Wall of Silence" – 3:48
5. "Flying Home" – 3:59
6. "Shadows and Lights" – 3:11
7. "Sailor" – 4:15
8. "Some Things Never Change" – 3:14
9. "Tourist Attraction" – 3:09
10. "Eastern Wind" – 5:17

== Personnel ==
- Chris de Burgh – lead vocals, harmony vocals, acoustic guitar, 12-string acoustic guitar
- Glenn Morrow – keyboards, synthesizers
- Erik Robertson – acoustic piano (3, 7), organ (3, 7)
- Tim Wynveen – lead guitar, acoustic guitar, electric guitars, harmony vocals
- Al Marnie – bass, harmony vocals
- Jeff Phillips – drums, percussion
- Dick Heckstall-Smith – percussion (6, 8, 9)
- John Helliwell – saxophone
- Lisa Dal Bello – backing vocals (2, 5, 8)
- Colina Phillips – backing vocals (2, 5)
- Sharon Lee Williams – backing vocals (2, 5)

Production

- Producer – David Anderle
- Assistant Producer – Kenny Thomson
- Engineer – Hayward Parrott
- Assistant Engineer – David Taylor
- Recorded at Manta Sound Studios, Toronto.
- Art Direction and Photography – Michael Ross
- Illustration – Allan Manham
