= This Way Up (album) =

Studio album by Chris de Burgh
- Released: 16 May 1994
- Genre: Rock
- Length: 45:14
- Label: A&M
- Producer: Peter Smith

Chris de Burgh chronology
Power of Ten (1992)	This Way Up (1994)	Beautiful Dreams (1995)

Professional ratings
Review scores
Source	Rating
AllMusic	3/5 stars
Music Week	4/5 stars

This Way Up is the eleventh studio album by British-Irish singer Chris de Burgh, released in 1994 on A&M Records. Two singles from the album charted in the United Kingdom: "Blonde Hair, Blue Jeans" (No. 51) and "The Snows of New York" (No. 60).

== Track listing ==
All tracks written by Chris de Burgh, except where noted.

1. "This Silent World" – 4:07
2. "This Is Love" – 3:47
3. "This Weight on Me" – 4:04
4. "Here Is Your Paradise" (de Burgh, Steve Duberry) – 3:28
5. "Oh My Brave Hearts" (de Burgh, Duberry) – 6:51
6. "Blonde Hair, Blue Jeans" – 3:25
7. "The Son and the Father" – 2:49
8. "Up Here in Heaven" – 5:56
9. "You Are the Reason" – 4:00
10. "Love's Got a Hold on Me" (de Burgh, Albert Hammond) – 3:44
11. "The Snows of New York" (de Burgh, Hammond) – 3:03

== Personnel ==
- Chris de Burgh – lead vocals, backing vocals
- Victor Martin – keyboards
- Neil Taylor – guitars
- Phil Spalding – additional rhythm guitars, bass guitar, backing vocals
- Jimmy Copley – drums
- Stephen McDonnell – brass (6)
- Nick Ingman – string arrangements (4, 7, 9)
- The London Session Orchestra – orchestra (4, 7, 9)
- Peter Smith – backing vocals
- Hannah Clive – backing vocals (6)

=== Production ===
- Produced, engineered and mixed by Peter Smith
- Assistant engineers – Rob Kirwan and Jim Lowe
- Mix engineer – Ben Darlow
- Design – Jeremy Pearce at Stylorouge

== Charts and certifications ==
=== Weekly charts ===
Chart (1994)	Peak position
Australian Albums (ARIA Charts)	149
Austrian Albums (Ö3 Austria)	37
Dutch Albums (Album Top 100)	28
German Albums (Offizielle Top 100)	4
Scottish Albums (OCC)	15
Swiss Albums (Schweizer Hitparade)	5
UK Albums (OCC)	5

=== Year-end charts ===
Chart (1994)	Position
German Albums (Offizielle Top 100)	49
Swiss Albums (Schweizer Hitparade)	34

=== Certifications ===
Region	Certification	Certified units/sales
Germany (BVMI)	Gold	250,000^{^}
United Kingdom (BPI)	Silver	60,000^{^}
^{^} Shipments figures based on certification alone.
