= Timing Is Everything (album) =

Studio album by Chris de Burgh
- Released: 2002
- Genre: Rock
- Length: 41:14
- Label: A&M
- Producer: Chris de Burgh; Chris Porter

Chris de Burgh chronology
Notes from Planet Earth - The Ultimate Collection (2001)	Timing Is Everything (2002)	The Road To Freedom (2004)

Timing Is Everything is singer Chris de Burgh's fourteenth original album, released in 2002. It peaked on UK's Official Albums Chart at No. 41 in the week of 28 September 2002.

== Track listing ==
All compositions by Chris de Burgh except as noted.

Timing Is Everything track listing
No.	Title	Length
1.	"Guilty Secret"	3:50
2.	"If Beds Could Talk"	3:47
3.	"Lebanese Night" (featuring Elissa)	4:46
4.	"Timing Is Everything"	4:47
5.	"There's Room in This Heart Tonight"	3:37
6.	"She Must Have Known" (de Burgh, Mark Spiro)	3:30
7.	"The Best That Love Can Be"	3:58
8.	"Bal Masqué"	3:28
9.	"Love and Time"	4:16
10.	"Another Rainbow"	3:47
11.	"Save Me"	2:47
Total length:		46:33

== Personnel ==
- Chris de Burgh – vocals, backing vocals
- Peter Gordeno – keyboards
- James Nisbet – guitars
- Phil Palmer – guitars
- Rick Mitra – bass, drums, percussion
- Tee Green – backing vocals
- Shelley Nelson – backing vocals
- Elissa Khoury – guest vocals on "Lebanese Night"

Production

- Chris de Burgh – producer, sleeve design
- Chris Porter – producer, engineer, mixing
- David Larkham – sleeve design
- Mike McCraith – sleeve design
- Magoo with M+H Communications Ltd. – art direction
- David Morley – portrait photography
- Alexey "Professor" Lebedinsky – Russian photos
