= The Troubles in Enniskillen =

Incidents in Enniskillen, Northern Ireland during the Troubles

The Troubles in Enniskillen recounts incidents during, and the effects of, The Troubles in Enniskillen, County Fermanagh, Northern Ireland.

The list includes all fatalities in the town during the Troubles:

== 1972 ==
- 26 August 1972 - Lance Corporal Alfred Johnston (32) and Private James Eames (33), both members of the Ulster Defence Regiment (UDR), were killed by a Provisional Irish Republican Army remote controlled bomb, hidden in an abandoned car and detonated when their patrol approached at Cherrymount, on the outskirts of Enniskillen.
- 16 November 1972 - Joseph Calvin (42), member of the Royal Ulster Constabulary, was killed by a booby trap bomb attached to his car in a car park on Quay Lane in Enniskillen.

== 1973 ==
- 5 June 1973 - David Purvis (22), member of the Royal Ulster Constabulary, was shot on foot patrol from a passing car on Belmore Street in Enniskillen.

== 1981 ==
- 25 November 1981 - Angela D'Arcy (24), civilian, was shot by an off-duty member of the British Army while walking on Middleton Street, Enniskillen.

== 1982 ==
- 9 November 1982 - Garry Ewing (31), off duty member of the Royal Ulster Constabulary, and Helen Woodhouse (29), civilian, were killed by a Provisional Irish Republican Army booby trap bomb attached to Ewings’ car parked outside the Lakeland Forum Leisure Centre, Enniskillen.

== 1983 ==
- 19 February 1983 - Alan Price (53), civilian, was shot dead while delivering post in Arney outside Enniskillen. It is believed that the intended target was an off-duty postman who was also a member of the Ulster Defence Regiment.

== 1984 ==
- 18 May 1984 - Thomas Agar (35), Robert Huggins (29) and Peter Gallimore (27), all off duty members of the British Army, were killed by a Provisional Irish Republican Army booby trap bomb attached to their car, outside the Lakeland Forum Leisure Centre, Enniskillen. Gallimore died on 18 October 1984.

== 1985 ==
- 3 March 1985 - Hugh McCormac (40), off-duty member of the Royal Ulster Constabulary, was shot dead in front of his family and other worshippers while leaving Mass at the Passionist Father's St. Gabriel's Retreat, the Graan.
- 7 April 1985 - Martin Love (24), civilian, was shot dead while walking along Factory Row in Enniskillen. The shooting is believed to have been carried out by the Ulster Freedom Fighters.

== 1987 ==
- 9 January 1987 - Ivan Crawford (49), member of the Royal Ulster Constabulary, was killed when a remote control bomb was detonated in a litter bin which he passed while on foot patrol on High Street, Enniskillen.
- 8 November 1987 - Remembrance Day bombing - Edward Armstrong (52), off duty member of the Royal Ulster Constabulary, Marie Wilson (20), Samuel Gault (49), Georgina Quinton (72), John Megaw (68), Wesley Armstrong (62), Bertha Armstrong (53), William Mullan (72), Agnes Mullan (70), Kit Johnston (70), Jessie Johnston (66) and Ronnie Hill (68), civilians, were killed by a Provisional Irish Republican Army time bomb which exploded near the war memorial, just before the Remembrance Day ceremony. Hill died on 28 December 2000, after being in a coma since the incident.
