= Moonfleet & Other Stories =

Studio album by Chris de Burgh
- Released: 2010
- Studios: Abbey Road Studios, British Grove Studios and Stanley House Studios (London, UK)
- Genre: Rock
- Length: 1:11:26
- Label: Ferryman Productions
- Producers: Chris de Burgh; Chris Porter

Chris de Burgh chronology
Footsteps (2008)	Moonfleet & Other Stories (2010)	Footsteps 2 (2011)

Moonfleet & Other Stories is the eighteenth original album by singer and songwriter Chris de Burgh, released in 2010. This album includes two parts, one including the story of Moonfleet (18 tracks), based on J. Meade Falkner's 1898 novel; and the other one, including six tracks, called Other Stories. The latter half of the title echoes that of de Burgh's 1975 album Spanish Train and Other Stories. For the launch of the album, de Burgh signed an exclusive deal with supermarket giant Asda for the physical release in the UK, and worked with digital companies AWAL and Topspin Media to distribute it digitally around the globe.

== Track listing ==
=== Moonfleet ===
All songs written by Chris de Burgh and John Meade Falkner.

1. "The Moonfleet Overture" -5:03
2. "The Village Of Moonfleet..." (Narration) -1:27
3. "The Light On The Bay" -1:57
4. "Have A Care" -2:52
5. "For Two Days And Nights..." (Narration) -1:14
6. "Go Where Your Heart Believes" -4:11
7. "The Escape" -4:19
8. "And So It Was..." (Narration) -0:29
9. "The Days Of Our Age" -1:54
10. "The Secret Of The Locket" -3:32
11. "With Heavy Heart..." (Narration) -0:36
12. "My Heart's Surrender" -4:10
13. "Treasure And Betrayal" -3:43
14. "Moonfleet Bay" -3:06
15. "The Storm" -3:23
16. "Greater Love" -3:29
17. "In The Years That Followed..." (Narration) -1:23
18. "The Moonfleet Finale" -3:00

=== Other Stories ===
All songs written by Chris de Burgh

1. "Everywhere I Go" -3:36
2. "The Nightingale" -3:47
3. "One Life, One Love" -3:42
4. "Why Mona Lisa Smiled" -3:37
5. "Pure Joy" -3:06
6. "People Of The World" - 3:50

== Personnel ==
- Chris de Burgh – vocals, guitars
- Peter Gordeno – keyboards, additional backing vocals
- Chris Porter – keyboards, percussion, narrator (2, 5, 8, 17)
- Chris Cameron – acoustic piano, orchestral arrangements
- Nigel Hopkins – accordion, Hammond organ, Moog bass, additional backing vocals
- Phil Palmer – guitars, additional backing vocals
- Neil Taylor – guitars
- Geoffrey Richardson – banjo, mandolin, fiddle, viola, whistle, additional backing vocals
- Jerry Maheen – bass guitar, bassoon, additional backing vocals
- Geoff Dugmore – drums, percussion, additional backing vocals
- Nick Ingman – orchestral conductor
- Royal Philharmonic Orchestra – orchestra
- Hazel Fernandez – backing vocals
- Jakko Jakszyk – backing vocals

=== Production ===
- Chris de Burgh – producer, sleeve design
- Chris Porter – producer, engineer, mixing
- Andrew Dudman – additional engineer
- Joe Kearns – additional engineer
- Alex Hutchinson – art direction
- SJ Johnson – sleeve design
- Kenny Thomson – sleeve design, management
- Rebecca Miller – photography
- Christie Goodwin – cover photography

=== Year-end charts ===
Chart (2010)	Rank
German Albums Chart	62
