= Power of Ten (album) =

Studio album by Chris de Burgh
- Released: 27 April 1992
- Studio: Metropolis Studios (London, England)
- Genre: Rock
- Length: 52:01
- Label: A&M
- Producer: Rupert Hine

Chris de Burgh chronology
High on Emotion: Live from Dublin (1990)	Power of Ten (1992)	This Way Up (1994)

Power of Ten is the tenth studio album by British-Irish singer Chris de Burgh, released in 1992 on A&M Records.

== Track listing ==
All tracks written by Chris de Burgh.

1. "Where We Will Be Going" – 4:30
2. "By My Side" – 4:24
3. "Heart of Darkness" – 4:45
4. "In Your Eyes" – 4:49
5. "Separate Tables" – 3:38
6. "Talk to Me" – 3:51
7. "The Connemara Coast" (with The Chieftains) – 3:47
8. "Brother John" – 4:55
9. "Shine On" – 4:59
10. "A Celebration" – 3:49
11. "She Means Everything to Me" – 3:19
12. "Making the Perfect Man" – 5:16

== Related recordings ==
"Separate Tables" was also recorded in two additional versions, an English duet and an English-German duet, with Greek singer Vicky Leandros and released on her 2000 album Jetzt!.

Lyrics and music of the track "Heart of Darkness" appear again as a recurrent motif in the later Chris de Burgh album Moonfleet & Other Stories, released in 2010, particularly in the track "The Light on the Bay".

== Personnel ==
- Chris de Burgh – lead vocals, backing vocals, additional acoustic guitar (2, 8, 9)
- Rupert Hine – keyboards
- Danny McBride – electric guitars, guitar solos
- Geoffrey Richardson – acoustic guitars, viola (1)
- Jamie West-Oram – electric guitar (6)
- John Giblin – bass
- Michael Witzel – drums, percussion
- Tim Sanders – saxophone
- The Chieftains – various instruments (7)
- Paddy Moloney – arrangements (7)
- Miriam Stockley – additional backing vocals (4, 6, 9)
- Linda Taylor – additional backing vocals (4, 6, 9)

=== Production ===
- Produced by Rupert Hine
- Engineered and mixed by Stephen W. Tayler
- Assistant technician – James Cadsky
- Art direction and design – Norman Service
- Photography – Richard Haughton

== Charts and certifications ==
=== Weekly charts ===
Chart (1992)	Peak position
Austrian Albums (Ö3 Austria)	29
Dutch Albums (Album Top 100)	38
German Albums (Offizielle Top 100)	1
Norwegian Albums (VG-lista)	7
Swiss Albums (Schweizer Hitparade)	3
UK Albums (OCC)	3

=== Year-end charts ===
Chart (1992)	Position
German Albums (Offizielle Top 100)	23
Swiss Albums (Schweizer Hitparade)	23

=== Certifications ===
Region	Certification	Certified units/sales
United Kingdom (BPI)	Gold	100,000^{^}
^{^} Shipments figures based on certification alone.
