= The Road to Freedom (Chris de Burgh album) =

Chris de Burgh's 15th album post-A&M release

Studio album by Chris de Burgh
- Released: May 10, 2004
- Genre: Rock
- Length: 43:52
- Label: Edel AG
- Producer: Chris de Burgh; Chris Porter

Chris de Burgh chronology
Timing Is Everything (2002)	The Road to Freedom (2004)	The Storyman (2006)

The Road to Freedom is singer Chris de Burgh's 15th original album, released in 2004. It was the first album released after he left A&M, who had released all of de Burgh's previous albums and singles.

It is rated 2.5 out of 5 stars on AllMusic.

== Track listing ==
All compositions by Chris de Burgh except as noted.

1. "When Winter Comes" – 3:48
2. "The Road to Freedom" – 4:26
3. "Snow Is Falling" – 3:53
4. "The Words 'I Love You'" – 3:26
5. "Songbird" – 4:00
6. "Five Past Dreams" – 3:48
7. "Here for You" – 3:41
8. "What You Mean to Me" – 3:29 (music: Phil Palmer, lyrics: de Burgh)
9. "Rose of England" – 5:14
10. "The Journey" – 3:52
11. "Read My Name" – 4:16
12. "Even Now" – 4:09 (Special Edition Only)
13. "Kiss Me from a Distance – 3:22 (Special Edition Only)
14. "Little Angel" – 3:10 (Special Edition Only)
15. "Once Upon a Time – 3:39 (Special Edition Only)

== Personnel ==
- Chris de Burgh – vocals, backing vocals, acoustic piano, guitars
- Chris Cameron – acoustic piano (1, 3), orchestral arrangements (1, 3, 7)
- Peter Gordeno – keyboards
- Phil Palmer – guitars
- Rick Mitra – bass guitar
- Danny Cummings – drums, percussion
- Gavyn Wright – orchestral leader
- Isobel Griffiths – orchestral contractor

== Production ==
- Chris de Burgh – producer, sleeve design
- Chris Porter – producer, engineer, mixing
- David Morley – photography (front cover and portrait)
- Mike McCraith – sleeve design
- Kenny Thomson – sleeve design, management
- M+H Communications Ltd. – art direction
