= Neil Norman =

British playwright

Neil Norman (b. Neil J. Streitberger) is a British playwright and critic.

A journalist on the New Musical Express in the early 1970s, Norman became a film critic for The Face and in the ensuing years a reviewer of film and theatre for various cinema magazines and national newspapers.

He joined the Evening Standard in 1986 as a film critic and feature writer. He appeared regularly as a contributor to the Sky Arts series Discovering and The Directors. He is co-author of a book about the 1985 film Insignificance and the Robbie Coltrane biography Looking For Robbie.

His plays have been performed in London, Toronto and New York.
