= Crusader (Chris de Burgh album) =

Studio album by Chris de Burgh
- Released: January 1979
- Studios: AIR Studios (London, UK); Additional recording at Abbey Road Studios (London, UK); Super Bear Studios (Nice, France)
- Genre: Rock
- Length: 41:31
- Label: A&M
- Producer: Andrew Powell

Chris de Burgh chronology
At the End of a Perfect Day (1977)	Crusader (1979)	Eastern Wind (1980)

Crusader is the fourth album by British-Irish singer-songwriter Chris de Burgh, released in 1979 by A&M Records. The album was produced by Andrew Powell, who worked with the Alan Parsons Project on many of their albums. The musicians on Crusader also came from the Alan Parsons Project.

== Critical reception ==
Professional ratings
Review scores
Source	Rating
AllMusic	4/5 stars

In a review for AllMusic, Mike DeGagne described the title track as the album's "crowning glory" and also "one of de Burgh's finest songs", despite its historically inaccurate lyrics. He went on to say that "Even though [the title track] bears most of this album's weight, the rest of the songs aren't without their merit".

== Track listing ==
All songs written by Chris de Burgh.

1. "Carry On" – 3:47
2. "I Had the Love in My Eyes" – 3:29
3. "Something Else Again" – 4:25
4. "The Girl with April in Her Eyes" – 4:55
5. "Just in Time" – 5:11
6. "Carry On" (Reprise) – 0:32
7. "The Devil's Eye" – 4:13
8. "It's Such a Long Way Home" – 3:31
9. "Old-Fashioned People" – 3:27
10. "Quiet Moments" – 1:38
11. "Crusader" – 8:48
  - "The Fall of Jerusalem"
  - "In the Court of Saladin"
  - "The Battlefield"
  - "Finale"
12. "You and Me" – 1:12

== Personnel ==
- Chris de Burgh – lead vocals, harmony vocals, 6 and 12-string acoustic guitars
- Mike Moran – acoustic piano, organ, synthesizers
- Francis Monkman – harpsichord (4)
- Andrew Powell – acoustic piano (5, 9, 11, 12), orchestra and choir arrangements, conductor
- Ian Bairnson – electric guitars, harmony vocals (3)
- David Paton – bass, harmony vocals (3, 8)
- Chris Laurence – string bass (4)
- Stuart Elliott – drums, percussion
- David Cripps – French horn solo (3)
- Skaila Kanga – harp (4)
- Olive Simpson – harmony vocals (8)

Production

- Andrew Powell – producer
- Jon Kelly – engineer
- Tim Cuthbertson – assistant engineer
- Nigel Walker – assistant engineer
- Michael Ross – art direction
- David Tyrell – design
- Rod Shone – photography
- Jon Wolstenholme – illustration

== Charts ==
Chart (1979–1986)	Peak position
Australian Albums (ARIA)	62
Canada Top Albums/CDs (RPM)	67
UK Albums (Official Charts)	72
