= A Spaceman Came Travelling =

1975 single by Chris de Burgh

Single by Chris de Burgh

from the album Spanish Train and Other Stories
- Released: 1975
- Recorded: 1975
- Genre: Rock, Christmas, art rock
- Length: 5:10
- Label: A&M
- Songwriter: Christopher Davison
- Producer: Robin Geoffrey Cable

Chris de Burgh singles chronology
"Turning Around" (1975)	"A Spaceman Came Travelling" (1975)	"Just Another Poor Boy" (1975)

Professional ratings
Review scores
Source	Rating
Record Mirror	3/5 stars

"A Spaceman Came Travelling" is a song by Chris de Burgh. It first appeared on his second studio album, Spanish Train and Other Stories, which was released in 1975. It has been released numerous times as a single, becoming a popular Christmas song, and has appeared on many Christmas compilation albums.

== Single release ==
After its first release in 1975, the song saw minimal success in the UK. It eventually reached the top position of the Irish single charts, staying 15 total weeks and climbed to number 22 in the Canadian AC charts in 1978.

== Composition ==
De Burgh, who had just signed his first recording contract with A&M Records, was broke and "staying at a friend's flat" in August 1974 when he read Chariots of the Gods? by Erich von Däniken. The book made him think "what if the star of Bethlehem was a space craft, and what if there is a benevolent being or entity in the universe keeping an eye on the world and our foolish things that we do to each other?" A fan of Irish poet William Butler Yeats, whose 1919 poem "The Second Coming" suggested that every 2,000 years or so there would be a major cataclysmic event happening, de Burgh saw the birth of Christ as "such an event and then 2,000 years later there would be a similar" one. He imagined "the nativity scene, the thing hovering over and I could see the shepherds in the fields and this weird, ethereal music was drifting into the air and they were 'what the heck is that'?" But he "had no ideas about trying to write a Christmas song or a hit record." The space theme was enhanced by the then-novel use of a string synthesizer on the track. The song was recorded at Air Studios in London. It was "hugely popular" around the world, particularly in Germany, Canada and Brazil.

"A Spaceman Came Travelling" failed to chart when it was first released as a single, but de Burgh has said it was "much better to have a regular recurring song than a hit for three weeks". The song receives regular airplay on UK radio during the Christmas season. Among the many places de Burgh has performed "Spaceman" have been the Kremlin and in 2015, Bethlehem. In December 2023 he performed the song with a full backing band and a gospel choir in Stadtcasino, Basel, Switzerland.

== Reissues and later chart success ==
In 1986, following de Burgh's huge hit "The Lady in Red", "Spaceman" was reworked with a re-recorded vocal and reissued as a double A-side with the song "The Ballroom of Romance". The new version charted for the first time in the UK, reaching number 40 and staying on the British charts for five weeks. It also reached No. 15 on the Irish charts. The reworked version appeared on the 1989 compilation album Spark to a Flame: The Very Best of Chris de Burgh, although some later compilations reverted to the 1975 version. The newer version was later credited as A Spaceman Came Travelling – 89 to differentiate between them.

Another newly recorded version, denoted by de Burgh's more mature vocal quality and different instrumentation, was released in 2010, titled "A Spaceman Came Travelling (2010)".

== Certifications ==
Region	Certification	Certified units/sales
United Kingdom (BPI)	Platinum	600,000^{‡}
^{‡} Sales+streaming figures based on certification alone.

== Cover versions ==
- Austrian rock band Eela Craig covered the song in 1978.
- John Gibbons covered the song in 2018. The song peaked at No. 58 on the Irish Singles Chart.
- Kate Rusby included a version on her 2023 album Light Years.
- Taiwan singer Samuel Tai covered the song on his 1993 album Find a Word to Replace.
- Taiwan singer Chyi Chin included a version on his 1994 album Ruthless Rain, Ruthless You.
- Hong Kong singer Sam Hui covered the song in 1977.
- Celtic Woman covered it on their album Believe, with member Lisa Lambe singing it as a solo.

== See also ==
- 1975 in music
- Ancient astronauts
