= Far Beyond These Castle Walls =

Studio album by Chris de Burgh
- Released: 1974
- Genre: Rock
- Length: 44:26
- Label: A&M
- Producer: Robin Geoffrey Cable

Chris de Burgh chronology
Far Beyond These Castle Walls (1974)	Spanish Train and Other Stories (1975)

Far Beyond These Castle Walls is the debut album by British-Irish singer Chris de Burgh, released in 1974 by A&M Records. The title refers to Bargy Castle, which is shown on the back of the album cover.

== Reception ==
Professional ratings
Review scores
Source	Rating
AllMusic	3/5 stars

Billboard in its review of 29 March 1975 considered the album's "sophisticated lyrics and production are good for college market" and expressed a hope that A&M Records will found "another deserving artist" in face of Chris De Burgh. Mike DeGagne of AllMusic retrospectively praised the album, saying: "His gentle, beguiling vocal style is introduced, which instantly trademarks him as a genuine master of the soft ballad... What is most important about this album is the manner in which it reveals de Burgh as one of the finest mood-invoking artists ever."

== Track listing ==
All compositions by Chris de Burgh.

1. "Hold On" – 4:03
2. "The Key" – 4:08
3. "Windy Night" – 4:53
4. "Sin City" – 4:35
5. "New Moon" – 4:59
6. "Watching the World" – 3:32
7. "Lonesome Cowboy" – 4:23
8. "Satin Green Shutters" – 5:02
9. "Turning Round", released outside the UK and Ireland as "Flying" – 6:24
10. "Goodnight" – 2:07

== Musicians ==
- Chris de Burgh – vocals, acoustic guitars, additional synthesizers
- Ronnie Leahy – keyboards
- Ken Freeman – string synthesizer
- Phillip Goodhand-Tait – harmonium
- Ray Glynn – electric guitars
- B.J. Cole – pedal steel guitar
- Ray Jackson – harmonica, mandolin
- Brian Odgers – bass guitar
- Chris Laurence – double bass
- Barry De Souza – drums
- Lennox Laington – percussion
- Del Newman – arrangements (1, 8)
- Richard Hewson – arrangements (2, 9)
- Chris Hughes – brass arrangements
- Madeleine Bell – backing vocals
- Liza Strike – backing vocals
- Joy Yates – backing vocals

Production

- Produced and engineered by Robin Geoffrey Cable
- Assistant engineers – Mark Dodson and Mike Stavrou
- Recorded at Ramport Studios and AIR Studios (London, UK).
- Mixed at AIR Studios and Trident Studios (London, UK).
- Art direction – Fabio Nicoli
- Design – Nick Marshall
- Photography – Dave Morse
