= The Getaway (Chris de Burgh album) =

Studio album by Chris de Burgh
- Released: September 1982
- Studio: Farmyard Studios (Little Chalfont, Buckinghamshire, England)
- Genre: Pop rock
- Length: 44:47
- Label: A&M
- Producer: Rupert Hine

Chris de Burgh chronology
Best Moves (1981)	The Getaway (1982)	Man on the Line (1984)

Professional ratings
Review scores
Source	Rating
AllMusic	4/5 stars

The Getaway is singer Chris de Burgh's sixth album, released on A&M Records in 1982. It was the first studio album of de Burgh's to chart in the UK, following the compilation Best Moves a year earlier. The album peaked at number 30 in the UK and spent 16 weeks on the chart. In the week beginning 7 February 1983, the album went to the top of the album charts in the then West Germany. In Canada the album spent 36 weeks in the Top 100.

== Background ==
The album was spearheaded by the U.S. top 40 hit, "Don't Pay the Ferryman", an upbeat, mythology-tinged pop rock song that evokes images of Charon, the ferryman of the Greek underworld, which also became his first UK hit single, reaching number 48.

Another song from the album which has become a de Burgh fan-favourite is "Borderline", the story of a conscientious objector who chooses to flee with his lover than be drafted for military service. A staple of de Burgh's live act, the song's story was continued in 1986's "Say Goodbye to It All" from the later album Into the Light.

In an interview Chris de Burgh pointed out, that the collaboration with producer Rupert Hine strongly influenced the style of the album:

"... I can definitely say that there is a lot of difference. He is a man who understands the mortar and brick of building a track musically. There are more subtle and complex inter-rhythms in the new album than I’ve had on any others. And we blended wonderfully together. I could get on with the bits that I’m good at, and he could get on with the bits that he’s good at. It made for a very strong connection."

Drums on the album were played by Steve Negus of the Canadian progressive rock band Saga.

Some of the guest vocalists were Anthony Head, Diane Davison (Chris de Burgh's wife) and Miriam Stockley (who also collaborated with Mike Oldfield on the album The Millennium Bell (1999)).

== Track listing ==
1. "Don't Pay the Ferryman" – 3:48
2. "Living on the Island" – 3:31
3. "Crying and Laughing" – 4:33
4. "I'm Counting on You" – 4:27
5. "The Getaway" – 3:52
6. "Ship to Shore" – 3:49
7. "All the Love I Have Inside" – 3:18
8. "Borderline" – 4:37
9. "Where Peaceful Waters Flow" – 3:54
10. "The Revolution" – 1:46
11. "Light a Fire" – 2:08
12. "Liberty" – 5:02

The Japanese CD splits the last three tracks differently:

10. "The Revolution" – 3:54
11. "Light a Fire" – 4:30
12. "Liberty" – 0:31

All compositions by Chris de Burgh.

== Personnel ==
- Chris de Burgh – lead vocals, backing vocals, guitars, acoustic piano (8)
- Rupert Hine – synthesizers, percussion, orchestral arrangements, backing vocals, programming (6, 9)
- David Caddick – acoustic piano (4)
- Phil Palmer – acoustic guitars, electric guitars
- Tim Wynveen – acoustic guitars (2, 3, 11, 12), electric guitars (2, 3, 11, 12), additional vocals
- John Giblin – bass guitar, fretless bass
- Steve Negus – drums
- Anthony Thistlethwaite – saxophones
- Stephen W. Tayler – saxophones, woodwinds
- Nigel Warren-Green – cello (4)
- Anthony Head – voice (1)
- Diane Davison – additional vocals
- Miriam Stockley – additional vocals
- Sue Wilkinson – additional vocals

=== Production ===
- Produced by Rupert Hine
- Engineered by Stephen W. Tayler
- Mastered by Bernie Grundman at A&M Studios (Hollywood, California, USA).
- Art Direction and Back Cover Photography – Michael Ross
- Inner Bag Photography – Fin Costello
- Illustration – Syd Brak
- Typography – Andrew Ellis

== Charts ==
=== Weekly charts ===
Chart (1983)	Peak position
Australian Albums (Kent Music Report)	18
Austrian Albums (Ö3 Austria)	3
Canada (RPM Magazine)	9
German Albums (Offizielle Top 100)	1
New Zealand Albums (RMNZ)	36
Norwegian Albums (VG-lista)	2
UK Albums (OCC)	30
US Billboard 200	43

=== Year-end charts ===
Chart (1983)	Position
Canada (RPM Magazine)	58
German Albums (Offizielle Top 100)	4

== Certifications and sales ==
Region	Certification	Certified units/sales
Canada (Music Canada)	Platinum	100,000^{^}
Germany (BVMI)	Platinum	500,000^{^}
^{^} Shipments figures based on certification alone.
