= Man on the Line =

Chris de Burgh album

Studio album by Chris de Burgh
- Released: 7 May 1984
- Studio: Farmyard Studios, Buckinghamshire
- Genre: Pop rock
- Length: 41:04
- Label: A&M
- Producer: Rupert Hine

Chris de Burgh chronology
The Getaway (1982)	Man on the Line (1984)	The Very Best of Chris de Burgh (1984)

Professional ratings
Review scores
Source	Rating
AllMusic	4/5 stars

Man on the Line is the seventh studio album by British-Irish singer Chris de Burgh, released in 1984 by A&M Records. It includes guest appearances from American singer Tina Turner and British musician Howard Jones.

== Singles ==
The album produced de Burgh's second UK hit single, "High on Emotion", which entered the chart on 12 May 1984 and peaked at number 44, the same position it reached on the US Billboard Hot 100. The follow-up single, "The Ecstasy of Flight (I Love the Night)", reached number 80 in the UK. "Sight and Sound" was released as the third single from the album, but it failed to chart.

== Commercial performance ==
Man on the Line reached number 11 on the UK Albums Chart and remained on the chart for 24 weeks. In Germany and Switzerland, it reached number one on the weekly charts and was the second-best-selling album of 1984 in both countries.

== Track listing ==
All songs written by Chris de Burgh.

No.	Title	Length
1.	"The Ecstasy of Flight (I Love the Night)"	4:01
2.	"Sight and Touch"	3:14
3.	"Taking it to the Top"	4:00
4.	"The Head and the Heart"	3:59
5.	"The Sound of a Gun"	4:29
6.	"High on Emotion"	4:26
7.	"Much More Than This"	2:57
8.	"Man on the Line"	4:25
9.	"Moonlight and Vodka"	3:39
10.	"Transmission Ends"	5:59
Total length:		41:04

== Personnel ==
Musicians

- Chris de Burgh – vocals, guitars
- Rupert Hine – keyboards, synthesizers, orchestral arrangements
- Howard Jones – grand piano (4)
- Phil Palmer – electric guitars
- John Giblin – bass guitar (3)
- Trevor Morais – drums (5)
- Jeff Phillips – additional drums (10)
- Tina Turner – guest vocals (5)

Touring band members

- Glenn Morrow – keyboards, synthesizers
- Ian Kojima – synthesizers, guitars, saxophone
- Danny McBride (musician) – electric guitars
- Al Marnie – bass guitar, backing vocals
- Jeff Phillips – drums, percussion

Production

- Produced by Rupert Hine
- Engineering and mixing – Stephen W. Tayler
- Assistant engineer – Andrew Scarth
- Mastering – Frank DeLuna at A&M Mastering Studios (Hollywood, California, USA)
- Photography – Brian Griffin
- Art direction – Michael Ross
- Assistant art director – Dave Margereson
- Design – Simon Adamczewski and Jerry Williams

== Charts ==
=== Weekly charts ===
Chart (1984–1985)	Peak position
Austrian Albums (Ö3 Austria)	9
Dutch Albums (Album Top 100)	46
German Albums (Offizielle Top 100)	1
Norwegian Albums (VG-lista)	6
Swedish Albums (Sverigetopplistan)	12
Swiss Albums (Schweizer Hitparade)	1
UK Albums (OCC)	11

=== Year-end charts ===
Chart (1984)	Position
German Albums (Offizielle Top 100)	2
Swiss Albums (Schweizer Hitparade)	2
Chart (1985)	Position
German Albums (Offizielle Top 100)	56
