= At the End of a Perfect Day =

Studio album by Chris de Burgh
- Released: 1977
- Studio: Morgan (London, UK)
- Genre: Rock
- Length: 35:23
- Label: A&M
- Producer: Paul Samwell-Smith

Chris de Burgh chronology
| Spanish Train and Other Stories (1975) | At the End of a Perfect Day (1977) | Crusader (1979) |

At the End of a Perfect Day is singer Chris de Burgh's third album, released in 1977.

== Critical reception ==
Professional ratings
Review scores
| Source | Rating |
|---|---|
| AllMusic | 2.5/5 stars |
| The Encyclopedia of Popular Music | 3/5 stars |
| The Rolling Stone Album Guide | 2/5 stars |

The Irish Times called the album one of de Burgh's "darkest, most bittersweet releases."

== Track listing ==
All compositions by Chris de Burgh

1. "Broken Wings" – 3:06
2. "Round and Around" – 3:06
3. "I Will" – 3:30
4. "Summer Rain" – 4:00
5. "Discovery" – 3:21
6. "Brazil" – 3:13
7. "In a Country Churchyard (Let Your Love Shine On)" – 3:56
8. "A Rainy Night in Paris" – 3:21
9. "If You Really Love Her, Let Her Go" – 4:01
10. "Perfect Day" – 4:01

== Personnel ==
- Chris de Burgh – lead vocals, backing vocals (1–7, 9, 10), Spanish guitar solo (1), guitars (2–5, 7, 9, 10), foot tap (2), harpsichord (5), acoustic piano (8)
- Paul Hart – acoustic piano (4, 5, 7, 10)
- Alun Davies – acoustic guitar (1), guitars (3, 4)
- Bryn Haworth – electric guitar (10), slide guitar (10)
- Dave Markee – bass (1, 3–5, 7, 10), backing vocals (10)
- Gerry Conway – drums (1, 3, 4)
- Dave Mattacks – drums (5, 7, 10), percussion (5)
- Barry Morgan – drums (5), percussion (5)
- Morris Pert (as "Maurice Pert") – percussion (2)
- Jimmy Jewell – saxophone (2, 8), brass (4)
- John Mumford – brass (4)
- Brian Rogers – string arrangements (3, 5), horn arrangements (5)
- Del Newman – string arrangements (7, 9)
- Paul Samwell-Smith – backing vocals (1–3, 9, 10)
- Sue Lynch – backing vocals (7)

The Spiteri Band on "Brazil"

- Jorge Spiteri – acoustic piano, guitars, backing vocals
- Joseito Romero – guitars, flute, backing vocals
- José Manuel Arria – bass guitar
- Bernardo Ball – drums, percussion

Production

- Paul Samwell-Smith – producer
- Mike Bobak – engineer
- Nick Cook – assistant engineer
- Fabio Nicoli – art direction
- Nick Marshall – cover design
- Roger Stowell – photography
- Bob Garcia – liner notes
