= Spanish Train and Other Stories =

Studio album by Chris de Burgh
- Released: 1 November 1975
- Studios: Ramport and Scorpio
- Genre: Rock
- Length: 43:28
- Label: A&M
- Producer: Robin Geoffrey Cable

Chris de Burgh chronology
Far Beyond These Castle Walls (1974)	Spanish Train and Other Stories (1975)	At the End of a Perfect Day (1977)

Alternative cover
- Non-European releases

Professional ratings
Review scores
Source	Rating
AllMusic	4/5 stars
Music Week	2/4 stars

Spanish Train and Other Stories is the second album by Chris de Burgh, released by A&M Records on 1 November 1975.

Releases in some markets, like in North America, used different cover art from those in Europe. Rather than the simple white-on-black text of the European releases, the North American releases depicted an image of a distant train under a sky in the evening.

== Censorship in South Africa ==
The title track is a story about a train carrying the souls of the dead to the Underworld. God and Lucifer are playing Poker – gambling with the souls. Lucifer cheats and wins the game. The song finishes with the stanza:

And far away in some recess
The Lord and the Devil are now playing chess,
The Devil still cheats and wins more souls,
And as for the Lord, well, he's just doing his best...

— "Spanish Train"

The song was deemed blasphemous in South Africa, and a ban was ordered. A&M sued to get the ban overturned – the suit was eventually successful. However, while the suit was in progress, A&M released the album under the title Lonely Sky and Other Stories (without "Spanish Train"). This album is considered a collector's item, as copies are extremely rare. The ban only applied to the LP record, so the cassette issue of "Spanish Train" was always freely available.

== Track listing ==
All songs written by Chris de Burgh.

1. "Spanish Train" – 5:00
2. "Lonely Sky" – 3:52
3. "This Song For You" – 4:14
4. "Patricia the Stripper" – 3:30
5. "A Spaceman Came Travelling" – 5:10
6. "I'm Going Home" – 3:34
7. "The Painter" – 4:20
8. "Old Friend" – 3:40
9. "The Tower" – 5:22
10. "Just Another Poor Boy" – 4:46

== Personnel ==
- Chris de Burgh – lead vocals, all backing vocals, acoustic guitars, acoustic piano (3, 9)
- Tony Hymas – keyboards
- David Hentschel – ARP synthesizer (5), synthesizer arrangements (5)
- Ken Freeman – string synthesizer
- Phillip Goodhand-Tait – harmonium
- Ray Glynn – electric guitars
- Tony Reeves – bass guitar, string bass (5)
- Chris Laurence – string bass
- Barry de Souza – drums
- Lennox Laington – percussion
- Mick Eves – saxophone (7)
- Chris Mercer – saxophone (7)
- Richard Hewson – brass and string arrangements (1, 10)
- Robert Kirby – choir, ocarina, recorder and string arrangements (2, 9); brass arrangements (3, 8)

Production

- Producer and Engineer – Robin Geoffrey Cable
- Assistant Engineers – Mark Dobson, Ian Major and John Kelly.
- Mixed at Scorpio and AIR Studios (London, UK).
- Mastered by Denis "BilBo" Blackham at Master Room (London, UK).
- Front and Back Illustrations – Bill Imhoff
- Inside Photography – Clive Arrowsmith
- Art Direction – Fabio Nicoli
- Design – Junie Osaki

== Chart positions ==
=== Weekly charts ===
Chart (1976–85)	Peak position
Canada Top Albums (RPM)	64
U.K.	78
