= Into the Light (Chris de Burgh album) =

Studio album by Chris de Burgh
- Released: 27 May 1986
- Studio: Marcus Recording Studios (London); The Manor (Oxford)
- Genre: Pop rock
- Length: 50:24
- Label: A&M
- Producer: Paul Hardiman

Chris de Burgh chronology
| The Very Best of Chris de Burgh (1984) | Into the Light (1986) | Flying Colours (1988) |

Professional ratings
Review scores
| Source | Rating |
|---|---|
| AllMusic | 3/5 stars |

Into the Light is the eighth studio album by British-Irish singer Chris de Burgh, released in May 1986 by A&M Records. The album is notable for featuring de Burgh's biggest hit, "The Lady in Red".

== Release ==
Following the success of its lead single "The Lady in Red", which topped the UK Singles Chart and reached number three in the United States, the album peaked at number two on the UK Albums Chart, becoming de Burgh's first studio album to enter the top ten. "Fatal Hesitation" was a UK number 44 hit, spending four weeks on the chart.

"Say Goodbye to It All" was a continuation of the song "Borderline" from 1982's The Getaway. Both songs frequently appear in de Burgh's concerts and compilation albums. The song "For Rosanna" is dedicated to de Burgh's then two-year-old daughter Rosanna.

== Critical reception ==
Dennis Hunt of the Los Angeles Times wrote, "There's really nothing else as schmaltzy as 'The Lady in Red' on his album [... ] Into the Light includes some gutsy, fairly absorbing pop-rock — some not what you'd expect from 'the Irish Barry Manilow.'"

== Track listing ==
All songs written by Chris de Burgh.

| No. | Title | Length |
|---|---|---|
| 1. | "Last Night" | 6:07 |
| 2. | "Fire on the Water" | 4:28 |
| 3. | "The Ballroom of Romance" | 4:26 |
| 4. | "The Lady in Red" | 4:16 |
| 5. | "Say Goodbye to It All" | 5:23 |
| 6. | "The Spirit of Man" | 4:40 |
| 7. | "Fatal Hesitation" | 4:16 |
| 8. | "One Word (Straight to the Heart)" | 4:30 |
| 9. | "For Rosanna" | 3:39 |
| 10. | "The Leader" | 2:16 |
| 11. | "The Vision" | 3:13 |
| 12. | "What About Me?" | 3:03 |
| Total length: | | 50:24 |

== Personnel ==
- Chris de Burgh – vocals, guitars
- Nick Glennie-Smith – keyboards
- Glenn Morrow – keyboards
- Andy Richards – keyboards
- Danny McBride – guitars
- Phil Palmer – guitars
- John Giblin – bass
- Al Marnie – bass
- Pino Palladino – bass
- Tony Beard – drums
- Peter Van Hooke – drums
- Jeff Phillips – drums
- Gary Barnacle – saxophone
- Ian Kojima – saxophone
- Carol Kenyon – additional vocals (6)

=== Production ===
- Produced, engineered and mixed by Paul Hardiman
- Assistant engineers – Dick Beetham and Steve Chase
- Art direction and design – Mike Ross and John Warwicker
- Art dictator – Dave Margereson
- Photography – Richard Haughton
- Cover painting – Mike Doud

== Charts ==
=== Weekly charts ===
| Chart (1986) | Peak position |
|---|---|
| Austrian Albums (Ö3 Austria) | 19 |
| Dutch Albums (Album Top 100) | 9 |
| German Albums (Offizielle Top 100) | 2 |
| Irish Albums (IRMA) | 1 |
| New Zealand Albums (RMNZ) | 10 |
| Norwegian Albums (VG-lista) | 1 |
| Swedish Albums (Sverigetopplistan) | 20 |
| Swiss Albums (Schweizer Hitparade) | 2 |
| UK Albums (OCC) | 2 |
| US Billboard 200 | 25 |

=== Year-end charts ===
| Chart (1986) | Position |
|---|---|
| Dutch Albums (Album Top 100) | 37 |
| German Albums (Offizielle Top 100) | 5 |
| Swiss Albums (Schweizer Hitparade) | 6 |

| Chart (1987) | Position |
|---|---|
| German Albums (Offizielle Top 100) | 15 |

== Certifications ==
Certifications for Into the Light
| Region | Certification | Certified units/sales |
|---|---|---|
| Australia (ARIA) | 2× Platinum | 140,000^{^} |
| Canada (Music Canada) | 2× Platinum | 200,000^{^} |
| Germany (BVMI) | 2× Platinum | 1,000,000^{^} |
| New Zealand (RMNZ) | Gold | 7,500^{^} |
| Switzerland (IFPI Switzerland) | Platinum | 50,000^{^} |
| United Kingdom (BPI) | 2× Platinum | 600,000^{^} |
| United States (RIAA) | Gold | 500,000^{^} |
^{^} Shipments figures based on certification alone.
