= Don't Pay the Ferryman =

Single by Chris de Burgh

from the album The Getaway
- Released: September 1982
- Studio: Farmyard Studios (Little Chalfont, Buckinghamshire, England)
- Genre: Art rock
- Length: 3:48 (album version); 3:24 (single version)
- Label: A&M
- Songwriter: Chris de Burgh
- Producer: Rupert Hine

Chris de Burgh singles chronology
"Waiting for the Hurricane" (1981)	"Don't Pay the Ferryman" (1982)	"The Getaway" (1982)

"Don't Pay the Ferryman" is a song by the British-Irish singer-songwriter Chris de Burgh. It was released in September 1982 as the lead single from his album The Getaway.

AllMusic critic Sharon Mawer stated the song has become "a standard art rock classic" and one of de Burgh's most frequently played songs on radio, despite not reaching the Top 40 on its original UK release.

== Background ==
The song tells the story of a man who boards a ferryboat and sets off. A storm approaches and the ferryman demands payment. The song's narrator warns the passenger not to pay the ferryman until the boat arrives at its destination on the other side.

The repetitive lyrics are believed to have a connection with mythology. The song describes the ferryman as "the hooded old man at the rudder". The ferryman demanding his payment is also similar to the Greek ferryman of the dead, Charon. He demanded an obolus (coin) to ferry dead souls across the River Styx. Those who did not pay were doomed to remain as ghosts, remaining on the plane of the mare, the restless dead.

In the bridge of the song, lines from Shakespeare's The Tempest can be heard, spoken very low by British actor Anthony Head.
[Act 5, Scene 1, lines 230–237]

BOATSWAIN: I'd strive to tell you. We were dead of sleep
And (how we know not) all clapp'd under hatches;
Where, but even now, with strange and several noises
Of roaring, shrieking, howling, jingling chains,
And moe diversity of sounds, all horrible,
We were awak'd; straightway at liberty;
Where we, in all her trim, freshly beheld
Our royal, good, and gallant ship;

This section of the song is omitted from the version of the song released as a single, which is approximately 20 seconds shorter than the album version.

== Music video ==
The music video for "Don't Pay the Ferryman" was directed by Maurice Phillips.

== Chart positions ==
"Don't Pay the Ferryman" became de Burgh's first UK hit single almost eight years into his recording career when it entered the chart on 23 October 1982 and peaked at number 48, staying on the chart for five weeks. In 1983, the single reached number 34 on the Billboard Hot 100 chart in the United States. It was a major hit on the Australian Kent Music Report chart, where it reached the Top five and spent 25 weeks in the Top 100.

=== Weekly charts ===
Charts (1982-1983)	Peak position
Australia (Kent Music Report)	5
Canada Top Singles (RPM)	32
Germany (GfK)	24
Ireland (IRMA)	9
New Zealand (Recorded Music NZ)	29
UK Singles (Official Charts)	48
US Billboard Hot 100	34

=== Year-end charts ===
Chart (1983)	Position
Australia (Kent Music Report)	36

== Popular Culture ==
The song was referenced in the Trailer Park Boys episode "Dressed All Over & Zesty Mordant".
