= Missing You (Chris de Burgh song) =

Single by Chris de Burgh

from the album Flying Colours
- Released: 17 October 1988
- Length: 4:07
- Label: A&M
- Songwriter: Chris de Burgh
- Producers: Chris de Burgh, Paul Hardiman

Chris de Burgh singles chronology
"Love Is My Decision" (1988)	"Missing You" (1988)	"Tender Hands" (1989)

"Missing You" is a song by Chris de Burgh, released in 1988 as the first single from the album Flying Colours. The song reached the top five in the UK, peaking at No. 3. In Ireland, the song reached No. 1.

== Track listing ==
UK 12" single
A. "Missing You" - 4:07
B1. "The Risen Lord" - 3:40
B2. "The Last Time I Cried" - 5:32

== Chart performance ==
Chart (1988)	Peak position
Australia (Kent Music Report)	45
Canada (RPM)	17
Germany (Media Control Charts)	29
Ireland (IRMA)	1
Netherlands (Dutch Top 40)	37
Switzerland (Schweizer Hitparade)	20
United Kingdom (Official Charts Company)	3
