= Chris de Burgh =

Irish-English singer (born 1948)

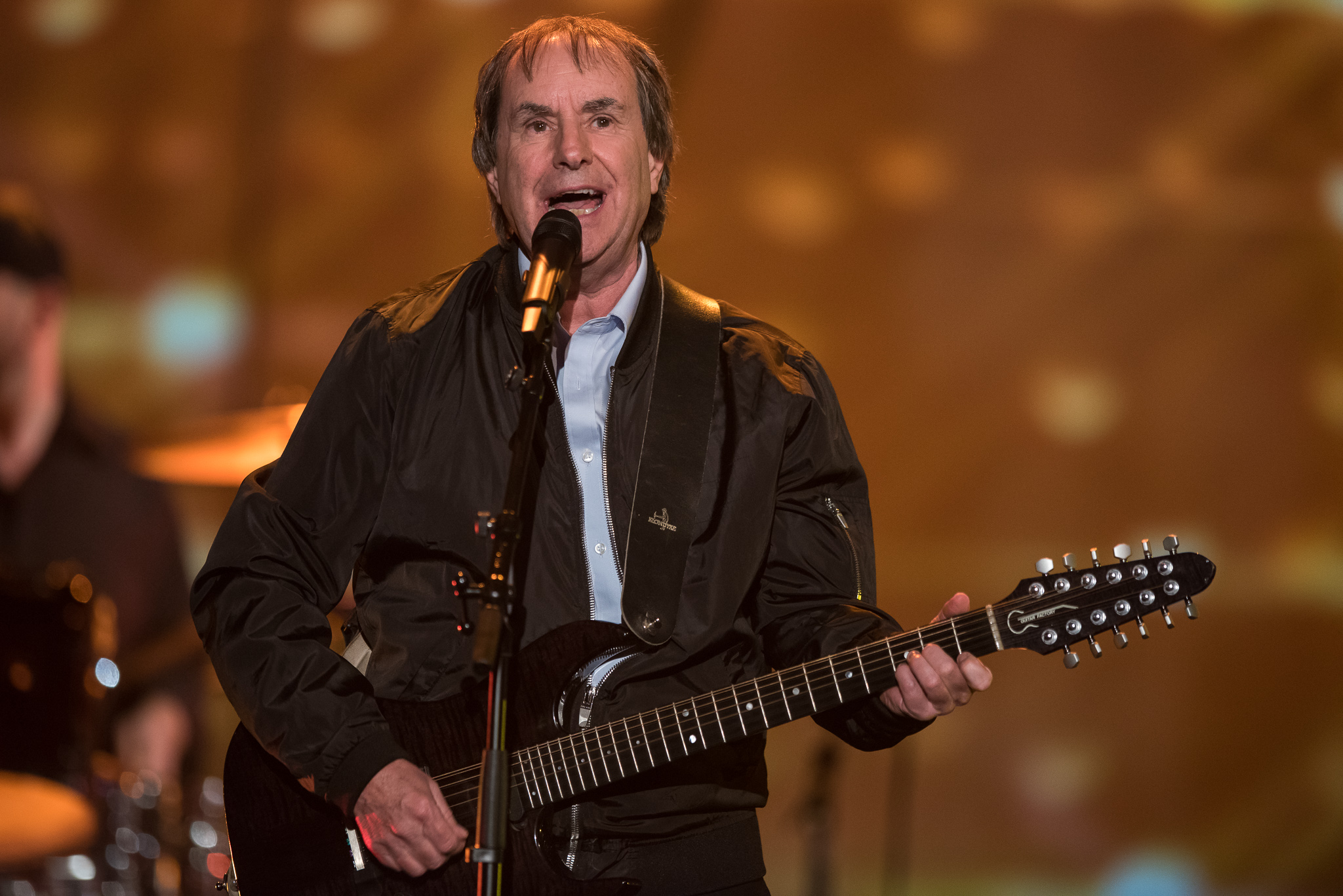
- de Burgh performing at Frankenhalle in Nuremberg, Germany in 2016
- Born: Christopher John Davison; 15 October 1948 (age 78); Venado Tuerto, Santa Fe Province, Argentina
- Occupations: Singer-songwriter; musician
- Years active: 1974–present
- Spouse: Diane Davison (m. 1977)
- Children: 3: Rosanna, Hubie and Michael
- Musical career
- Origin: County Wexford, Ireland
- Genres: Art rock; pop; soft rock
- Instruments: Vocals; guitar; piano
- Labels: A&M; Ferryman Productions; Edel
- Website: cdeb.com

Christopher John Davison (born 15 October 1948), known professionally as Chris de Burgh (English: /də ˈbɜːr/ də-BER), is a British and Irish singer-songwriter and musician born in Argentina. He started out as an art rock performer and progressed to writing more pop-oriented material. He has had several top 40 hit singles in the UK and two in the US. He is more popular in other countries, particularly Norway and Brazil. His 1975 "A Spaceman Came Travelling" became a popular Christmas song and his 1986 love song "The Lady in Red" reached number one in several countries. De Burgh has sold over 45 million albums worldwide.

== Early life ==
De Burgh was born in Venado Tuerto, Argentina, to Colonel Charles John Davison, a British diplomat, and Maeve Emily (née de Burgh). His maternal grandfather was General Eric de Burgh, a British Army officer who had been Chief of the General Staff in India during the Second World War. He took his mother's maiden name, "de Burgh", as a stage name when he began performing. His legal surname remained "Davison". His father had substantial farming interests and Chris spent much of his early years in Malta, Nigeria and the Belgian Congo, as he and his mother and brother accompanied Colonel Davison on his diplomatic and engineering work.

The Davison family finally settled in Bargy Castle, County Wexford, Ireland, a dilapidated twelfth-century castle which his father had bought in the 1960s. It was converted into a hotel and a young Chris sang for the guests there.

De Burgh attended Marlborough College in Wiltshire, England, where he was in the year below Nick Drake. He wanted to join a jazz band that Drake had formed with four schoolmates, the Perfumed Gardeners, but was rejected because his musical tastes were considered "too poppy". De Burgh went on to study English and French at Trinity College Dublin.

== Musical career ==
=== Early career ===
De Burgh signed his first contract with A&M Records in 1974. He supported Supertramp on their Crime of the Century tour and acquired a small fan base. His début album, Far Beyond These Castle Walls, was a folk-tinged stab at fantasy in the tradition of the Moody Blues. It failed to chart upon its release in late 1974. A few months later, he released a single, "Turning Round", from the album. It was released outside the UK and Ireland as "Flying". It failed to make an impression in the UK, but it stayed on top of the Brazilian charts for 17 weeks. This became a familiar pattern for the singer/songwriter, as every one of his 1970s albums failed to chart in the UK or US while they achieved big sales in continental European and South American countries.

In 1975, de Burgh's second album, Spanish Train and Other Stories, was released. It was not a huge commercial success but the album and tour expanded his fan base and de Burgh started to attract a cult following. With the title track, other favourite tracks from the album included "Patricia The Stripper" and "A Spaceman Came Travelling" which was released the following year as a single. The album made the lower end of the Canadian charts, giving de Burgh his first North American chart exposure. He maintained a fan following and consistent chart success in Canada for the rest of his major label career.

De Burgh's third album, At the End of a Perfect Day (1977), featured former Fairport Convention drummer Dave Mattacks and later Fairport drummer Gerry Conway. Two years later he released his fourth album, Crusader. Crusader took a more electric direction, including guitar contributions from Ian Bairnson (formerly of Pilot), bass player David Paton (also of Pilot), and drummer Stuart Elliott (formerly of both Cockney Rebel and Steve Harley & Cockney Rebel), a.k.a. Alan Parsons's band, all of whom were also working at the time with Kate Bush. The album also featured Sky keyboard player Francis Monkman and Mike Moran. It attracted a significant number of new fans but still failed to break through in the UK and US. 1980's Eastern Wind also failed to build further on de Burgh's cult following in the major territories.

=== International success ===
In 1981, de Burgh had his first UK chart entry with Best Moves, a compilation album of his work. It set the stage for 1982's The Getaway, produced by Rupert Hine, which reached number 30 in the UK chart and number 43 in the US. This followed the success of the single "Don't Pay the Ferryman", which became his first single to chart in the UK and reached the US Billboard Hot 100 Top 40.

In 1984, de Burgh's follow-up album, Man on the Line, also performed well, charting at number 69 in the US and number 11 in the UK and topping the charts in Germany and Switzerland. Its first single, "High on Emotion", became an international success and reached the Top 20 in several countries It entered the top five in Ireland, France and Switzerland and the Top 50 in the UK and US.

In summer 1986, de Burgh released a ballad, "The Lady in Red", which became a worldwide hit single. It reached number one in the UK and number three in the US. Its accompanying album, Into the Light, reached number two in the UK and became the seventeenth best-selling album of the year there. It reached number 25 in the US. That Christmas season, a re-release of his 1975 Christmas song "A Spaceman Came Travelling" became a Top 40 hit in the UK.

Flying Colours (1988), a follow-up to Into the Light, produced a second UK top five hit, "Missing You", and the single topped the Irish chart. The album entered the chart at number one in the UK and Ireland but failed to enter the US chart. De Burgh did not have another hit in the US and his commercial fortunes began to slide in the UK in the early 1990s. He retained a following around the world.

In 1997, de Burgh wrote "There's a New Star Up in Heaven Tonight", dedicated to Diana, Princess of Wales, who counted de Burgh among her favourite music artists. The song was released as a 100-copy limited edition and included on the compilations The Ultimate Collection (2000) and Now and Then (2009).

=== 2007–2021 ===
In 2007, a concert in Tehran was planned for mid-2008 with local band Arian, which would have made de Burgh the first western pop singer to perform in Iran since the 1979 revolution. The concert was cancelled because he had not been given permission by the Iranian authorities to perform in the country.

In 2008, de Burgh released Footsteps, his seventeenth album, which included cover versions of thirteen songs that had inspired him throughout his career by artists including Bob Dylan, the Beatles, Toto and Pete Seeger. The album reached the top five in UK. In 2011, de Burgh released his follow-up, Footsteps 2, which entered the UK Top 40. De Burgh was the first Western act to play in Lebanon after the Lebanese Civil War.

On his 73rd birthday, 15 October 2021, de Burgh released a music video for his single "Legacy" directed by Iranian filmmaker/animator Sam Chegini. It came from the animated music video for his 27th studio album, The Legend of Robin Hood.

=== 2024–present: 50 ===
In October 2024, de Burgh released a new compilation album, 50, which chronicled his 50 years in the music business. He made a guest appearance on LOL: Last One Laughing Ireland, during which he sang "The Lady in Red" for the contestants.

2026: Cameo Role in “Rivals”

In Season 2, Episode 10 of Rivals produced by Disney+, De Burgh made a brief appearance singing his own classic 1986 song Lady In Red at the Hunt Ball where the wedding of Gerald and Muffy took place. He can be heard continuing to sing the song throughout the scene.

== Personal life ==
De Burgh has been married to his wife Diane since 1977. They lived in Dalkey, Dublin. In 1997, they moved to the Bushey Park Estate in Enniskerry, County Wicklow. They sold Bushey Park in 2023. They have two sons, Hubie and Michael, and a daughter, Rosanna, who was the winner of the Miss World competition in 2003 for Ireland. His second cousin, Danny Kinahan of Castle Upton, served as Member of Parliament for South Antrim between 2015 and 2017.

In 1994, de Burgh was found to have had an affair with his children's 19-year-old Irish nanny, Maresa Morgan, who was assisting the family while de Burgh's wife Diane was recuperating in hospital from a broken neck, suffered during a horse-riding accident. De Burgh later said he felt very guilty about the affair and was subsequently reconciled with his wife.

In 2011, bottles from de Burgh's vintage wine cellar sold for over $500,000, which included a world record set for a magnum collection of postwar vintages. De Burgh has an interest in war history, especially of the First and Second World wars. His songs contain numerous references to soldiers and battle, and in 2006 he purchased a rare First World War letter written by an unknown soldier. He enjoys classical music, including Handel, Bach and Pachelbel.

De Burgh has said that he is "certainly a believer in Christ", but he has always had a deep distrust of organized religion. He believes in the power of spiritual healing as an alternative therapy to reduce pain. He claims that he has been able to heal people with his own hands and that he gained an "all-encompassing strength" that was contacted through prayer.

== Media profile and criticism ==
During the 1970s, de Burgh received mainly positive feedback from the music press as he attempted to build his career. Since the release of "The Lady in Red" in 1986, both the music and news media have become more negative towards him, both personally and professionally.

De Burgh has pursued and won 16 defamation actions. The Irish Independent said he has always been a bit prickly about criticism. Peter Crawley, a theatre reviewer at The Irish Times, received a directed response from de Burgh when he wrote a less than sympathetic review of de Burgh's show in Dublin's Gaiety Theatre in September 2009. Crawley wrote: "He departs the stage for 'Lady in Red', invading boxes and draping himself over audience members ... Certain toes will never uncurl after this experience, but it is almost admirable how unaltered de Burgh has remained by the flow of time." In a lengthy, much-publicised reply to the critic, de Burgh made his feelings known, particularly in the postscript:

We were wondering by way of explanation and, as you seem to portray yourself as a bitter and unfulfilled man, were you much teased by your school chums in the schoolyard and called 'Creepy Crawley'?

AllMusic critic Greg Prato stated, "Depending on who you ask, Chris de Burgh either specializes in pretentious, bombastic art rock disguised as pop or is a master of penning soaring and majestic compositions." The BBC said of de Burgh, "To his millions of fans, Chris de Burgh is the ultimate romantic singer. But to many others he's a figure of fun." When the staff of Melody Maker were putting together a lampoon edition of a new arts and music magazine, they chose de Burgh for the cover. His signature song, "The Lady in Red", has been repeatedly voted one of the public's most disliked songs. In 2006, Neil Norman, writing for The Independent, described de Burgh as "the world's naffest balladeer". In his favour, Mike DeGagne, writing for AllMusic, acclaimed de Burgh as "a genuine master of the soft ballad" and "one of the finest mood-invoking artists ever".

== Awards and nominations ==
Award	Year	Nominee(s)	Category	Result	Ref.
ASCAP Pop Music Awards	1988	"The Lady in Red"	Most Performed Song	Won	
Echo Music Prize	1993	Chris de Burgh	Best International Male	Nominated	
Echo Music Prize	2012	Chris de Burgh	Best International Male	Nominated	

== Discography ==
Studio albums

- Far Beyond These Castle Walls (1974)
- Spanish Train and Other Stories (1975)
- At the End of a Perfect Day (1977)
- Crusader (1979)
- Eastern Wind (1980)
- The Getaway (1982)
- Man on the Line (1984)
- Into the Light (1986)
- Flying Colours (1988)
- Power of Ten (1992)
- This Way Up (1994)
- Quiet Revolution (1999)
- Timing Is Everything (2002)
- The Road to Freedom (2004)
- The Storyman (2006)
- Footsteps (2008)
- Moonfleet & Other Stories (2010)
- Footsteps 2 (2011)
- Home (2012)
- The Hands of Man (2014)
- A Better World (2016)
- The Legend of Robin Hood (2021)

== Filmography ==
- The Grand Knockout Tournament (1987) (as Himself)
- How to Cheat in the Leaving Certificate (1998) (as Petrol Pumper)
- The Bachelor S26 E07 (2022) (as Himself)
