= The Lady in Red (Chris de Burgh song) =

1986 single by Chris de Burgh

Single by Chris de Burgh

from the album Into the Light
- B-side: "Borderline"; "The Ecstasy of Flight (I Love the Night)"
- Released: 20 June 1986
- Genre: Soft rock
- Length: 4:17
- Label: A&M
- Songwriter: Chris de Burgh
- Producer: Paul Hardiman

Chris de Burgh singles chronology
"Fire on the Water" (1986)	"The Lady in Red" (1986)	"Fatal Hesitation" (1986)

"The Lady in Red" is a song by Irish singer-songwriter Chris de Burgh. It was released on 20 June 1986, by A&M Records, as the second single from his eighth album, Into the Light (1986). Charting at number one in several countries and reaching the top three in the United States, the song was responsible for introducing de Burgh's music to a mainstream audience worldwide. However, this song was his only major international hit.

== Creation ==
The song was written in reference to his wife, Diane, who used to come and watch him perform at his parents' hotel. It was released on the album Into the Light. On the British TV series This Is Your Life, de Burgh said that the song was inspired by the memory of when he first saw Diane, and how men so often cannot even remember what their wives were wearing when they first met. It is written in the key of B♭ major, and the drum pattern is performed by a Roland TR-808 drum machine.

== Release ==
The song was a massive hit across the world, quickly becoming de Burgh's best-selling single and his signature song, transforming him from a cult artist into a household name in many countries. It reached the number one position in Canada, the United Kingdom, Ireland, Norway, and the Flanders region of Belgium. It reached number three in the United States during the spring of 1987. The song also propelled its parent album Into The Light to the number two position in the United Kingdom and success in other markets. The song was de Burgh's third UK hit single and first to reach the top 40.

== Critical reception ==
Responding to de Burgh's comment that the song was "not the best song I ever wrote", Dennis Hunt of the Los Angeles Times wrote in 1987, "That's an understatement. It's not even the best song on his latest album [...] Whether you like the song or not, it's easy to see why this syrupy ballad clicked with the masses, even though it doesn't have a particularly memorable melody, distinctive vocals or an ounce of subtlety. What it does boast, however, is the kind of gushing sentiment women love to hear from men — but seldom do."

The song was voted the tenth most annoying song of all time in a poll commissioned by Dotmusic in 2000. It was one of only two singles in the top ten which were not novelty songs. It was also voted the third worst song of the 1980s by readers of Rolling Stone. It was chosen as the sixth worst love song of all time by Gigwise, who said "it is destined to grate on you at weddings forever more." In a 2001 poll of more than 50,000 Channel 4 viewers and readers of The Observer, the song was voted the fourth most-hated UK number-one single.

Neil Norman of The Independent argued in 2006, "Only James Blunt has managed to come up with a song more irritating than Chris de Burgh's 'Lady in Red'. The 1986 mawkfest – according to De Burgh – has reduced many famous people to tears including Diana, Princess of Wales, Fergie and Mel Smith. The less emotionally impressionable, meanwhile, adopt Oscar Wilde's view on the death of Little Nell – that it would take a heart of stone to listen to 'Lady in Red' and not laugh."

== Music video ==
The music video for "The Lady in Red" is a studio performance, with animation at the beginning and at the end of the song. It features a curly-haired woman in red who depicts the song's lyrics. The performance clips were taken from a 1986 episode of the BBC programme Top of the Pops.

== Legacy ==
The song has been featured on numerous movie soundtracks. It is briefly featured in a scene of the 2000 film American Psycho where the main character Patrick Bateman is listening to the song while in his office; in the 1988 Academy Award-winning film Working Girl and its soundtrack, during a slow dance scene between Tess McGill (Melanie Griffith) and Mick Dugan (Alec Baldwin); in the 2004 film, Dodgeball: A True Underdog Story, acting as the theme music for the character Fran Stalinovskovichdaviddivichski (played by Missi Pyle), who wears a red warmup suit; in the 2008 film Baby Mama, in which it appears twice, as a favorite song of Kate Holbrook's (played by Tina Fey); and in the 2024 film Deadpool & Wolverine, during the scene when the dog variant of Deadpool (played by Ryan Reynolds) named Mary Puppins aka Dogpool (played by Peggy the Pugese) comes running to Deadpool in the Void.

It was sampled by Daniel Lopatin in his 2009 video album Memory Vague as "Nobody Here" and his landmark 2010 vaporwave album Chuck Person's Eccojams Vol. 1.

== Charts ==
=== Weekly charts ===
Chart (1986–1987)	Peak position
Australia (Kent Music Report)	2
Austria (Ö3 Austria Top 40)	7
Belgium (Ultratop 50 Flanders)	1
Canada Retail Singles (The Record)	1
Canada Top Singles (RPM)	1
Canada Adult Contemporary (RPM)	5
Europe (European Hot 100 Singles)	5
Finland (Suomen virallinen lista)	6
France (IFOP)	67
Ireland (IRMA)	1
Israel (IBA)	1
Netherlands (Dutch Top 40)	6
Netherlands (Single Top 100)	4
New Zealand (Recorded Music NZ)	6
Norway (VG-lista)	1
Portugal (AFP)	2
South Africa (Springbok Radio)	1
Spain (AFYVE)	4
Sweden (Sverigetopplistan)	3
Switzerland (Schweizer Hitparade)	18
UK Singles (Official Charts)	1
US Billboard Hot 100	3
US Adult Contemporary (Billboard)	2
US Cash Box Top 100	2
West Germany (GfK)	5

=== Year-end charts ===
Chart (1986)	Position
Australia (Kent Music Report)	24
Belgium (Ultratop 50 Flanders)	12
Canada Top Singles (RPM)	3
Europe (European Hot 100 Singles)	42
Netherlands (Dutch Top 40)	32
Netherlands (Single Top 100)	28
UK Singles (OCC)	6
West Germany (Media Control)	55

Chart (1987)	Position
Australia (Kent Music Report)	72
Brazil (Crowley)	3
Canada Top Singles (RPM)	70
South Africa (Springbok Radio)	1
US Billboard Hot 100	21
US Cash Box Top 100	25

== Certifications ==
Region	Certification	Certified units/sales
Brazil (Pro-Música Brasil)	Gold	30,000^{‡}
Canada (Music Canada)	Platinum	100,000^{^}
Denmark (IFPI Danmark)	Gold	45,000^{‡}
Spain (Promusicae)	Platinum	60,000^{‡}
United Kingdom (BPI)	Gold	500,000^{^}
^{^} Shipments figures based on certification alone.^{‡} Sales+streaming figures based on certification alone.

== Alternate versions ==
- In 1987, de Burgh released a Spanish language adaptation of "The Lady in Red" entitled "La Dama de Ayer" (literally "the lady of yesterday") as a 7-inch single in Spain.
- In 1995, de Burgh recorded a version with a full orchestra for Beautiful Dreams, his twelfth original album.
- In 2000, V/Vm released a version of “The Lady in Red” called “The Lady in Red (Is Dancing With Meat)” on his album “Sick-Love”.
- In 2022, de Burgh performed a solo piano version of "The Lady in Red" in Schönbrunn Palace on the ABC reality television show, The Bachelor.

== See also ==
- List of number-one singles of 1986 (Canada)
- List of number-one singles of 1986 (Ireland)
- List of UK Singles Chart number ones of the 1980s
- VG-lista 1964 to 1994
