= Chris Porter (producer) =

British record producer and engineer

- Occupations: Record producer; engineer
- Years active: 1976–present

Chris Porter is a British record producer, audio engineer and narrator. He has worked with Sir Elton John, Take That, George Michael and Chris de Burgh.
