= Elgart =

Elgart is a surname. Notable people with the surname include:

- Bill Elgart (born 1942), American jazz drummer
- Larry Elgart (1922–2017), American jazz bandleader, brother of Les
- Les Elgart (1917–1995), American swing jazz bandleader and trumpeter

== See also ==
- Elgort
