= Philip Kives =

Canadian business executive (1929–2016)

- Born: 12 February 1929; Oungre, Saskatchewan, Canada
- Died: 27 April 2016 (aged 87); Winnipeg, Manitoba, Canada
- Occupation: TV salesman
- Known for: founding K-tel and coining "As seen on TV"

Philip Kives (/ˈkiːvəs/ KEE-vəs; 12 February 1929 – 27 April 2016) was a Canadian business executive, entrepreneur, and marketing expert from Winnipeg, Manitoba. He is best known for founding K-tel, which sold household gadgets including the Miracle Brush, Feather Touch Knife, Veg-O-Matics, as well as many compilation record albums.

Kives reputedly coined the catchphrase "As seen on TV", which was included in many of the company's advertisements. Kives utilized low-budget television commercials to sell millions of products and build an international business empire.

== Personal life ==
=== Early life ===
Philip Kives was born on 12 February 1929, as the third of four children, on a small farm, near the town of Oungre, Saskatchewan. His parents were originally from Eastern Europe; because of hardships suffered by Jewish people, the family was relocated to Turkey by the Jewish Colonization Organization. In 1927, they immigrated to western Canada and worked a small farm. During the Great Depression, this part of Canada was seriously afflicted by drought, causing frequent crop failures. The family struggled financially, and along with other farmers in the area lived on welfare for many years. The family home was without electricity and running water. In his memoirs Kives tells of milking cows from the age of five and making butter in a hand churn.

In his youth, Kives showed an aptitude as a salesman. At the age of 8, he set up a trapline; he sold his own furs, as well as those he bought from other children at his school, at fur auctions. He used the money to buy clothing.

=== Adult life ===
In 1946, Kives left Saskatchewan and moved to Winnipeg. There, he sold iceboxes, drove a taxi and delivery truck, was a short order cook, and finished high school. In 1953, at the age of 24, he was hired as a door-to-door salesman in the city and nearby country towns, and succeeded in selling sewing machines and stainless steel cookware. Two years later, he and his brother Theodore moved to Atlantic City, New Jersey, selling kitchen items on the Boardwalk beside other pitchmen, including Ed McMahon, and developing his salesmanship.

In 1961, Kives traveled to New York City where he worked at Macy's Department Store doing floor demonstrations of a new revolutionary product: the non-stick Teflon frying pan. He returned to Canada and made the first of many deals with Eaton's Department Store: he offered to pay for television advertising of the frying pan, if Eaton's agreed to stock it. Many pans were sold, but the product itself was a failure because, after a time, the Teflon coating came off during cooking. Kives' marketing formula consisted of live two-and-a-half minute TV commercials, in which he recreated the fast-talking "hard sell" that he had developed in the United States. He is often credited with creating what would come to be known as the "infomercial". The success of this formula led Kives to set up his own company, K-Tel.

He was the uncle of journalist Bartley Kives.

Kives was a long time resident of Winnipeg. He died 27 April 2016, at the age of 87.

== K-tel ==
Kives returned to Winnipeg in 1962, and began marketing products he had acquired in the United States: the Miracle Brush, Feather Touch Knife, Pattie Stacker, Fishin’ Magician, Brush-O-Matic, and the Veg-O-Matic. He traveled to Australia in August, 1965, with a tape of his TV commercial and 720 Feather Touch Knives. By December he had sold one million knives, at a profit of one dollar per knife. At first his main U.S. supplier was Samuel Popeil, the father of Ronco founder Ron Popeil, but later he found a variety of sources of for his merchandise.

In 1966, Kives marketed K-tel's first music compilation 25 Great Country Hits with a Bobby Darin 45 RPM giveaway for $3.49. Kives then released 25 Polka Greats which sold more than 1.5 million copies. Kives wrote, directed and produced most of the company's television commercials. For his next album Kives recruited Bing Crosby, Perry Como, Liberace and Sammy Davis Jr.

K-tel's music sold equally well in Europe. By 1972, Kives was releasing a "K-tel greatest hits" album every few weeks. K-tel also produced the original series "Hooked on Classics" which sold more than 10 million copies and was nominated for a Grammy. From 1977 to 1983, K-tel sold 150 million albums. By 1979, K-tel had expanded operations to 34 countries and posted pre-tax profits of US$10 million.

The company heavily invested in real estate, oil and gas exploration, films and video games in the early 80's. In 1984, financial overextension forced K-tel into Chapter 11 to stave off its creditors and in Canada the Bank of Montreal forced the company into receivership. Kives reorganized and K-tel resumed business in the U.S. and Europe. He launched a new company, K-5 Leisure Products, in Canada which targeted the consumer video market. By 1987, the reorganization of K-tel International had been completed and the company was again profitable. In 1998 it had net sales of $85.6 million and had begun selling products on-line.

In 2016, K-tel had a music catalogue of 20,000 songs, which were marketed through ITunes and licensed for use in film, television shows and commercials.

== Trivia ==
Starting in 1977, Kives was a thoroughbred horse racing breeder and the owner of K-5 Stables, Inc., based in Winnipeg. The stables produced thoroughbred stake winning horses in Manitoba, Kentucky, Florida, New York, Toronto, and Alberta.
