= Hooked on Swing =

1982 popular album of swing medleys in disco format

Studio album by Larry Elgart and his Manhattan Swing Orchestra
- Released: 1982
- Recorded: 1982
- Studios: RCA Studios, New York NY
- Genres: Pop music; swing; disco
- Length: 39:17
- Label: RCA
- Producers: Larry Elgart; George Lukan

Larry Elgart and his Manhattan Swing Orchestra chronology
Hooked on Swing (1982)	Hooked on Swing 2 (1983)

Hooked on Swing is an album produced by Larry Elgart in 1982 for K-tel International and released by RCA Records.

== Origins ==
K-tel scored a major success with the release in 1981 of Hooked on Classics, a classical crossover album recorded by the Royal Philharmonic Orchestra conducted by Louis Clark. The album consisted of medleys of familiar themes in Western classical music. K-tel recorded a similar medley album of swing music in Australia, titled "Switched on Swing," and pitched it to RCA, which declined but suggested the concept be pursued with Larry Elgart. He agreed to produce a recording of swing medleys with a disco beat programmed on a drum machine. K-tel announced its plans for Hooked on Swing in May 1982, and the album, credited to Larry Elgart and His Manhattan Swing Orchestra, was recorded and released later that month. It contained six tracks of swing medleys by veteran arrangers Mike Abene, Dick Hyman, and Bobby Scott.

== Reception and sales ==
With a half million sales in the three months after the album was released, Hooked on Swing was RIAA-certified gold in July 1982. It rose to a high of No. 24 after spending nine weeks on the Billboard Top LPs & Tape chart, and stayed on the chart for 37 weeks.

In July 1982, Billboard reported that "Larry Elgart's 'Hooked on Swing' collection is currently climbing the top 30. Hip industry insiders may think the medley craze is old hat, but evidently word hasn't filtered down to the public, which is still buying them in a big way."

In January 1985, Hooked on Swing was certified platinum, with a million sales.

The lead off track of the album, titled "Hooked on Swing," was released as a single, and began a climb up the music charts in June 1982. It spent nine weeks on the Billboard Top 50 Adult Contemporary chart, rising to No. 20 by July 27, 1982.

== Sequel ==
Hooked on Swing 2

The success of Hooked on Swing prompted K-tel and Elgart to produce a sequel, Hooked on Swing 2, released in February 1983. It debuted at No. 161 on the Billboard Top LPs & Tape chart, rising as high as No. 127, and fell off the chart by June.

== Hooked on Swing track listing ==
Track	Title	Time
1	"Hooked on Swing"	6:34
2	"Hooked on Big Bands"	6:50
3	"Hooked on a Star"	6:39
4	"Hooked on Astaire”	6:35
5	"Hooked on the Blue(s)"	6:12
6	"Hooked on Broadway"	6:27

=== Full track listing ===
1. Hooked On Swing
  - In The Mood
  - Cherokee
  - American Patrol
  - Sing, Sing, Sing
  - I've Got My Love to Keep Me Warm
  - Johnson Rag
  - Don’t Be That Way
  - Little Brown Jug
  - Opus Number One
  - Zing! Went the Strings of My Heart
  - Take the "A" Train
  - String Of Pearls
  - In The Mood (Reprise)
2. Hooked On Big Bands
  - Chattanooga Choo Choo
  - 9:20 Special
  - Frenesi
  - Stompin’ at the Savoy
  - Skyliner
  - Moten’s Swing
  - You’re Driving Me Crazy
  - Bandstand Boogie
  - Chattanooga Choo Choo (Reprise)
3. Hooked On A Star
  - New York, New York
  - All Of Me
  - They Can't Take That Away from Me
  - Come Fly With Me
  - I've Got a Crush on You
  - Saturday Night (Is the Loneliest Night of the Week)
  - Night And Day
  - All The Way
  - My Way
  - This Heart of Mine
  - Wee Small Hours
  - Witchcraft
  - All or Nothing at All
  - Chicago
  - My Kind of Town
  - New York, New York (Reprise)
  - Love and Marriage
4. Hooked On Astaire
  - Cheek to Cheek
  - It's De-Lovely
  - Change Partners
  - Flying Down To Rio
  - The Continental
  - The Way You Look Tonight
  - Top Hat, White Tie and Tails
  - Puttin' On The Ritz
  - Let Yourself Go
  - Let's Face the Music and Dance
  - Dancing In The Dark
  - I'm Putting All My Eggs in One Basket
  - Lovely To Look At
  - Isn’t This A Lovely Day
  - Shine On Your Shoes
  - Let's Call the Whole Thing Off
5. Hooked On The Blue(s)
  - St. Louis Blues
  - Blues in the Night
  - Am I Blue
  - Birth Of The Blues
  - Wabash Blues
  - Basin Street Blues
  - St. Louis Blues (Reprise)
6. Hooked On Broadway
  - Lullaby Of Broadway
  - Fanny
  - Sound Of Music
  - Hello Dolly
  - Luck Be a Lady
  - I Got TheSun in the Morning
  - On the Street Where You Live
  - People Will Say We're in Love
  - One
  - Tomorrow
  - Mame
  - Broadway
  - 42nd Street
  - Cabaret

== Hooked on Swing 2 track listing ==
Track	Title	Time
1	"Hooked on Dixie"	6:47
2	"Hooked on Swing 2"	5:55
3	"Save the Last Dance for Me"	4:24
4	"Hooked on the Roaring ’20s”	6:28
5	"Swingin’ the Classics"	4:50
6	"Swing with Bing"	5:24

=== Full track listing ===
1. Hooked on Dixie
  - South Rampart Street Parade
  - Mack the Knife
  - Everybody Loves My Baby
  - Twelfth Street Rag
  - Sweet Georgia Brown
  - Muskrat Ramble
  - Tiger Rag
  - Struttin’ With Some Barbecue
  - That's a Plenty
  - Jazz Me Blues
  - Royal Garden Blues
  - There'll Be Some Changes Made
  - Down by the Riverside
  - Limehouse Blues
  - Darktown Strutters' Ball
  - Bill Bailey
  - When The Saints Go Marchin' In
2. Hooked on Swing 2
  - Let’s Dance
  - Leap Frog
  - Jersey Bounce
  - Perdido
  - Rockin' in Rhythm
  - It Don't Mean a Thing (If It Ain't Got That Swing)
  - Minnie the Moocher
  - Christopher Columbus
  - Tippin' In
  - For Dancers Only
  - Intermission Riff
  - Woodchopper's Ball
  - King Porter Stomp
  - Let’s Dance—Reprise
3. Save the Last Dance for Me
  - Goodbye
  - Wrap Your Troubles in Dreams
  - In a Sentimental Mood
  - Going Home
  - Yesterdays
  - Goodnight Sweetheart
4. Hooked on the Roaring ’20s
  - Charleston
  - Button Up Your Overcoat
  - Stumbling
  - Ain't She Sweet
  - Chicago
  - Fascinating Rhythm
  - Japanese Sandman
  - Whispering
  - Varsity Drag
  - Black Bottom
  - The Man I Love
  - The Best Things In Life Are Free
  - Charleston—Reprise
5. Swingin’ The Classics
  - Song Of India
  - Carnival Of Venice
  - Golden Wedding
  - L'Arlésienne Suite
  - Martha (Oh, So Pure)
  - Humoresque
  - Fantaisie-Impromptu
  - Caprice No. 24
  - Prelude In C-Sharp
  - Piano Concerto No. 1
  - Anitra’s Dance
  - Sonata For Piano In C
6. Swing with Bing
  - Where the Blue of the Night (Meets the Gold of the Day)
  - White Christmas
  - Swinging on a Star
  - The Road To Morocco
  - Pennies From heaven
  - Just One More Chance
  - I Found a Million Dollar Baby (in a Five and Ten Cent Store)
  - In the Cool, Cool, Cool of the Evening
  - Brother, Can You Spare a Dime?
  - How Deep is the Ocean
  - Ac-Cent-Tchu-Ate the Positive
  - The Bells Of St. Mary’s
  - Too-Ra-Loo-Ra-Loo-Ral (That’s An Irish Lullaby)
  - Where The Blue Of The Night—Reprise
