= Hooked on Classics 3: Journey Through the Classics =

Hooked on Classics 3 (Journey Through the Classics)

Compilation album by Royal Philharmonic Orchestra
- Released: 1983
- Genre: Classical crossover
- Label: RCA Records
- Producers: Jeff Jarratt, Don Reedman

Royal Philharmonic Orchestra chronology
Hooked on Classics 2: Can't Stop the Classics (1982)	Hooked on Classics 3 (Journey Through the Classics) (1983)	Hooked on Classics 4: Baroque (1984)

Hooked on Classics 3 (Journey Through the Classics) is the third album in the Hooked on Classics series, performed by the Royal Philharmonic Orchestra under the direction of Louis Clark. Released in 1983 by RCA Records, the album continues the series’ distinctive blend of classical repertoire with contemporary rhythmic backing, designed to make orchestral music accessible to a wider audience.

== Background ==
In the early 1980s, Hooked on Classics became an unexpected musical phenomenon. Conceived by producers Don Reedman and Jeff Jarratt and arranged by Louis Clark of the Electric Light Orchestra, the project combined excerpts of well-known classical works with a steady disco beat. Performed by the Royal Philharmonic Orchestra, the album was released in 1981 and its opening track reached No. 2 on the UK Singles Chart. Inspired in part by the success of the Dutch production team that produced Stars on 45, which popularized disco medleys of familiar pop hooks, Reedman and Jarratt applied the same formula to classical repertoire, creating a new crossover project.

== Reception ==
The Hooked on Classics series was commercially successful in the early 1980s, appealing to audiences unfamiliar with classical music. While some classical purists criticized the disco-style drum machine backing, the albums were praised for their creativity and for introducing orchestral repertoire to new generations.

== Album details ==
Attribute	Information
Artist	Royal Philharmonic Orchestra, conducted by Louis Clark (arranger)
Series	Hooked on Classics (3 of 4)
Release year	1983
Label	RCA Records
Producer(s)	Jeff Jarratt, Don Reedman
Genre	Classical crossover, classical disco
Chronology	Preceded by Hooked on Classics 2: Can't Stop the Classics (1982); followed by Hooked on Classics 4: Baroque (1984)

== Track listing ==
1. Also Sprach Zarathustra - 1:11
  - Also Sprach Zarathustra, Op. 30, I: Prelude (Sunrise) / Richard Strauss
2. Journey Through The Classics - 3:50
  - Faust, Act 5, Ballet Music / Charles Gounod
  - A Midsummer Night's Dream, Op. 61, XI: Dance of the Clowns / Felix Mendelssohn
  - Horn Concerto No. 3 In E♭ Major, K. 447, III: Rondo: Allegro Vivace / Wolfgang Amadeus Mozart
  - Symphony No. 7 in A Major, Op. 92, III: Presto / Ludwig Van Beethoven
  - Concerto In D Major, Op. 7, No. 1 / Tomaso Albinoni
  - Trumpet Tune / Jeremiah Clarke
  - Samson And Delilah, Op. 47, Act 3, Bacchanale / Camille Saint-Saëns
  - Finlandia, Op. 26 / Jean Sibelius
3. Hooked On Haydn - 2:52
  - Trumpet Concerto In E♭ Major, Hob.: VIIe/1, III: Allegro (3rd Movement)
4. Hooked On Romance (Opus 3) - 4:17
  - Gymnopédies No. 1 / Erik Satie
  - Nocturnes, Op. 9 No. 2 in E Flat major/ Frederic Chopin
  - String Quartet No. 2 in D Major, III: Notturno / Alexander Borodin
  - Recuerdos de la Alhambra / Francisco Tárrega
  - Symphony No. 2 in D Major, Op. 43, IV: Finale / Sibelius
  - Carnival Of The Animals, XII: The Swan / Saint-Saëns
  - Symphony No. 3 in F Major, Op. 90, III: Poco allegretto (3rd Movement) / Johannes Brahms
  - Sicilianna / Louis Clark
5. Viva Vivaldi - 3:59
  - Concerto In C Major for Many Instruments, RV 558 (F. XII, No. 37), I: Allegro molto
  - Violin Concerto in D major, Op. 7 No. 11 RV 208a (F. XII, No. 14) I: Allegro
  - Concerto In G Major for Two Mandolins, RV 532 ( F. V, No. 2), I: Allegro
  - Concerto In C Major for Many Instruments, RV 558 (F. XII, No. 37), I: Allegro molto
  - Concerto In C Major for Many Instruments, RV 558 (F. XII, No. 37), III: Allegro
  - Concerto In C Major for Many Instruments, RV 558 (F. XII, No. 37), I: Allegro molto
  - Concerto In A Minor for Two Oboes and Strings, RV 536 (F. VII, No. 8), I: Allegro
  - Concerto In C Major for Many Instruments, RV 558 (F. XII, No. 37), I: Allegro molto
6. Dance Of The Furies - 3:28
  - Orfeo ed Euridice, Act 2, No. 28: Dance Of The Furies / Christoph Willibald Gluck
  - The Four Seasons, Op. 8- Concerto No. 2 in G Minor, RV 315, “Summer”, III: Presto / Vivaldi
7. Scotland The Brave (Hookery Jiggery Jock) - 3:50
  - Scotland the Brave
  - Ben Glen Bay
  - Cock O' The North
  - The Hundred Pipers
  - Charlie Is My Darling
  - The Bonnie Banks o' Loch Lomond
  - The Keel Row
  - Bonnie Dundee
  - Roxburgh Castle
  - Amazing Grace
8. Journey Through The Classics (Part 2) - 3:55
  - The Snow Maiden Suite, IV: Dance of the Tumblers / Nikolai Rimsky-Korsakov
  - The Bartered Bride, Act 3, No. 3: Dance Of The Comedians / Bedřich Smetana
  - Karelia Suite, Op. 11, III: Alla marcia / Sibelius
  - String Quartet, Op. 64, No. 5 in D Major, "The Lark", IV: Finale / Haydn
  - Symphony No. 6 in B Minor, Op. 74 “Pathetique”, III: Allegro molto vivace / Pyotr Ilyich Tchaikovsky
  - The Barber Of Seville, Act 1, "Largo al factotum"/ Gioacchino Rossini
  - The Merry Wives Of Windsor Overture / Otto Nicolai
9. Journey Through America - 3:22
  - The Star-Spangled Banner / John Stafford Smith
  - Oh! Susanna / Stephen Foster
  - Marching Through Georgia / Henry Clay Work
  - The Yellow Rose Of Texas / Traditional
  - When The Saints Go Marching In / Traditional
  - Jimmy Crack Corn / Traditional
  - When Johnny Comes Marching Home / Traditional
  - Deep in the Heart of Texas /Swander, Herschey
  - Yankee Doodle / Traditional
  - Cassions Goes Rolling Along / Traditional
  - Shortnin' Bread / Traditional
  - The Star-Spangled Banner (Reprise)/ Stafford Smith
10. Hooked On Marching - 3:10
  - Under the Double Eagle / J. F. Wagner
  - The Stars And Stripes Forever / John Philip Sousa
  - Under The Double Eagle / J. F. Wagner
  - The British Grenadiers / Traditional
  - Cavalry Of The Clouds / Kenneth J. Alford
  - Officer of the Day / Robert Browne Hall
  - King Cotton / Sousa
  - Imperial Echoes / Arnold Safroni-Middleton
11. Symphony Of The Seas - 2:47
  - The Sailor's Hornpipe / Traditional
  - Portsmouth / Traditional
  - Anchors Aweigh / Charles A. Zimmermann
  - A Life on the Ocean Wave / Henry Russell (musician)/Henry Russell
  - Drunken Sailor / Traditional
  - Blow The Man Down / Traditional
  - The Sailor's Hornpipe / Traditional
12. Hooked On Rodgers & Hammerstein - 3:37
  - Oklahoma Theme
  - June Is Bustin' Out All Over (From "Carousel")
  - There Is Nothin' Like A Dame (From "South Pacific")
  - The Farmer and the Cowman (From "Oklahoma!")
  - Do-Re-Mi (From "The Sound Of Music")
  - Oklahoma Theme (Reprise)
