= Hooked on Classics 2: Can't Stop the Classics =

Studio album by Royal Philharmonic Orchestra
- Released: 1982
- Genre: Classical disco
- Length: 44:16
- Label: K-Tel RCA Records; AFL1-4373; 4373-R; 07863-54373
- Producer: Jeff Jarratt & Don Reedman

Royal Philharmonic Orchestra chronology
Hooked on Classics (1981)	Hooked on Classics 2: Can't Stop the Classics (1982)	Hooked on Classics 3: Journey Through the Classics (1983)

Hooked on Classics 2: Can't Stop the Classics is an album by Louis Clark and the Royal Philharmonic Orchestra, released in 1982 by RCA Records as part of the Hooked on Classics series.

== Track listing ==
1. Can't Stop the Classics - 5:48
  - Ruslan and Lyudmila Overture / Mikhail Glinka
  - Coppélia, Act 1, No. 8: Csárdás / Léo Delibes
  - Piano Sonata No. 8 in C Minor, Op. 13, "Pathétique", I: Allegro di molto e con brio / Ludwig van Beethoven
  - Sylvia, Act 3, No. 18a: Divertissement - Pizzicato / Delibes
  - Slavonic Dance No. 8 in G Minor, Op. 46 / Antonín Dvořák
  - The Barber of Seville Overture / Gioachino Rossini
  - The Snow Maiden Suite, IV: Dance of the Tumblers / Nikolai Rimsky-Korsakov
  - The Four Seasons, Op. 8 - Concerto No. 4 in F Minor, RV 297, "Winter", I: Allegro non molto / Antonio Vivaldi
  - Étude in C Minor, Op. 10, No. 12, "Revolutionary" / Frédéric Chopin
  - Carnival Overture / Dvořák
  - Hungarian Rhapsody No. 2 in C♯ Minor / Franz Liszt
  - Gayane Suite No. 2, XI: Sabre Dance / Aram Khachaturian
2. Hooked on America - 4:07
  - Rhapsody in Blue / George Gershwin
  - Camptown Races / Stephen Foster
  - Rhapsody in Blue / Gershwin
  - An American in Paris / Gershwin
  - Rhapsody in Blue / Gershwin
  - Symphony No. 9 in E Minor, Op. 95, "From the New World", I: Allegro molto / Dvořák
  - Old Black Joe / Foster
  - Symphony No. 9 in E Minor, Op. 95, "From the New World", IV: Allegro con fuoco / Dvořák
  - Dixie / Dan Emmett
  - The Battle Hymn of the Republic / William Steffe
3. Hooked on Romance (Part 2) - 6:41
  - Canon in D Major / Johann Pachelbel
  - Enigma Variations, Op. 36, IX: Nimrod / Edward Elgar
  - Piano Concerto No. 2 in C Minor, Op. 18, I: Moderato / Sergei Rachmaninoff
  - Cavalleria Rusticana, Intermezzo / Pietro Mascagni
  - Étude in E Major, Op. 10, No. 3 / Chopin
  - Warsaw Concerto / Richard Addinsell
  - Woodland Sketches, I: "To a Wild Rose" / Edward MacDowell
  - Spartacus Suite No. 2, I: Adagio of Spartacus and Phrygia / Khachaturian
  - Concierto de Aranjuez, II: Adagio / Joaquín Rodrigo
4. Can't Stop the Classics (Part 2) - 6:30
  - Fanfare Intro / Louis Clark
  - Die Meistersinger von Nürnberg Overture / Richard Wagner
  - Peter and the Wolf / Sergei Prokofiev
  - Marche Slave / Tchaikovsky
  - Cantata BWV 208, "Was mir behagt, ist nur die muntre Jagd, IX: "Schafe können sicher weiden" (Sheep May Safely Graze) / Johann Sebastian Bach
  - Lohengrin, Act 3, No. 1: Bridal Chorus / Wagner
  - Turandot, Act 3, "Nessun dorma" / Giacomo Puccini
  - Aida, Act 2, Triumphal March / Giuseppe Verdi
  - Für Elise (Bagatelle No. 25 in A Minor) / Beethoven
  - Finlandia, Op. 26 / Jean Sibelius
  - Piano Sonata No. 8 in C Minor, Op. 13, "Pathétique", III: Rondo. Allegro / Beethoven
  - Pomp and Circumstance March No. 4 in G Major / Edward Elgar
  - String Quartet in F Major, Op. 3, No. 5, II: Andante cantabile / Roman Hoffstetter
  - String Quartet in C Major, Op. 76, No. 3, “Kaiserquartett”, II: Poco adagio. Cantabile / Joseph Haydn
  - Boléro / Maurice Ravel
5. A Night at the Opera - 6:04
  - Messiah, HWV 56, Part 2, No. 44: Hallelujah Chorus / George Frideric Handel
  - The Pirates of Penzance, Act 2, No. 26: "With Cat-Like Tread" / Arthur Sullivan
  - Symphony No. 9 in D Minor, Op. 125, IV: Presto- Allegro assai / Beethoven
  - Il Trovatore, Act 2, No. 1, "Vedi! Le Fosche Notturne Spogli" (Anvil Chorus) / Verdi
  - Carmen, Act 1, Prelude (Les Toréadors) / Bizet
  - Faust, Act 4, Soldiers' Chorus / Charles Gounod
  - Rule, Britannia! / Thomas Arne
  - Carmen, Act 2, "Votre toast, je peux vous le rendre" (Toreador Song) / Bizet
  - Messiah, HWV 56, Part 2, No. 44: Hallelujah Chorus / Handel
6. Tales of the Vienna Waltz - 4:04 (All music composed by Johann Strauss II)
  - On the Beautiful Blue Danube Waltz, Op. 314
  - Die Fledermaus Overture
  - Roses From the South Waltz, Op. 388
  - On the Beautiful Blue Danube Waltz, Op. 314
  - Vienna Blood Waltz, Op. 354
  - On the Beautiful Blue Danube Waltz, Op. 314
  - Artists' Life Waltz, Op. 316
  - On the Beautiful Blue Danube Waltz, Op. 314
  - Tales from the Vienna Woods Waltz, Op. 325
  - Morgenblätter Waltz, Op. 279
  - On the Beautiful Blue Danube Waltz, Op. 314
7. Hooked on Baroque - 4:23
  - The Four Seasons, Op. 8- Concerto No. 4 in F Minor, RV 297, "Winter", I: Allegro non molto / Vivaldi
  - The Four Seasons, Op. 8- Concerto No. 1 in E Major, RV 269, "Spring", I: Allegro / Vivaldi
  - The Four Seasons, Op. 8- Concerto No. 2 in G Minor, RV 315, "Summer", I: Allegro non molto / Vivaldi
  - Harpsichord Suite No. 5 in E Major, HWV 430, IV: Aria con variazioni (The Harmonious Blacksmith) / Handel
  - English Suite No. 2 in A Minor, BWV 807, V: Bourrée (No. 2) / Johann Sebastian Bach
  - Flute Sonata in D Major, II: Allegro / Leonardo Vinci
  - Brandenburg Concerto No. 5 in D Major, BWV 1050, I: Allegro / Bach
  - Flute Concerto in G Major, III; Allegro / Giuseppe Tartini
  - Flute Sonata No. 5 in E Minor, BWV 1034, II: Allegro / Bach
  - Flute Sonata No. 7 in C Major, Op. 1, IV: Gavotte / Handel
  - Suite in A Minor, TWV 55:a2, II: Les Plaisirs / Georg Philipp Telemann
  - Sonata for Violin and Keyboard No. 4 in C Minor, BWV 1017, IV: Allegro / Bach
  - Flute Concerto in G Major, I: Allegro Spiritoso / Giovanni Battista Pergolesi
  - The Four Seasons, Op. 8- Concerto No. 2 in G Minor, RV 315, "Summer", I: Allegro non molto / Vivaldi
  - The Four Seasons, Op. 8- Concerto No. 1 in F Minor, RV 297, "Winter", I: Allegro non molto / Vivaldi
8. If You Knew Sousa - 3:34
  - The Liberty Bell / Sousa
  - Blaze Away! / Abe Holzmann
  - The Liberty Bell / Sousa
  - Semper Fidelis / Sousa
  - The Washington Post / Sousa
  - Blaze Away! / Abe Holzmann
9. If You Knew Sousa (And Friends) - 3:05
  - Entrance of the Gladiators / Julius Fučík
  - Colonel Bogey March / Kenneth J. Alford
  - Royal Air Force March Past / Walford Davies
  - Pomp and Circumstance March No. 1 in D Major / Elgar
  - The Dam Busters March / Eric Coates
  - The Stars and Stripes Forever / Sousa
