= Bartley Kives =

Canadian journalist

Bartley Kives is a Canadian journalist, currently senior reporter for the Canadian Broadcasting Corporation's radio and television operations in Winnipeg, Manitoba. He won the Canadian Screen Award for Best Local Television Reporter at the 12th Canadian Screen Awards in 2024.

Formerly a print journalist for the Winnipeg Free Press, he joined the CBC in 2016.

He began his career as a music writer, editing CKUW-FM's music magazine Stylus while he was a student at the University of Winnipeg in the early 1990s. With the Free Press he began as a music and arts writer before transferring to the news section; in his later years with the publication, he also regularly wrote travel pieces. He has also published the travel books A Daytripper's Guide to Manitoba: Exploring Canada's Undiscovered Province, Stuck in the Middle: Dissenting Views of Winnipeg, and Stuck in the Middle 2: Defining Views of Manitoba.

He is the nephew of Philip Kives, the businessman who founded K-tel.
