= Invitation to the Dance (Weber) =

Piano piece by Carl Maria von Weber

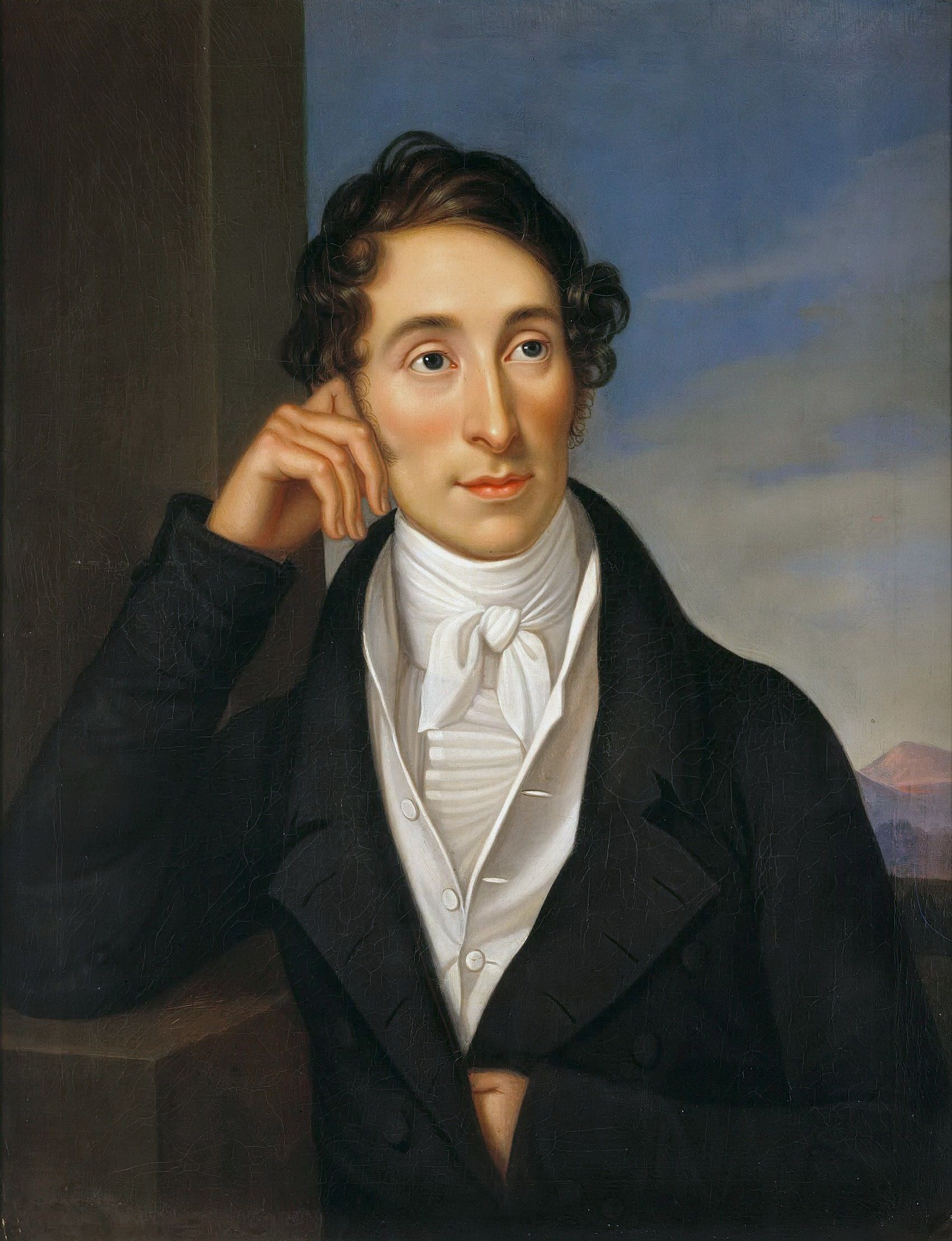
Portrait of Carl Maria von Weber by Caroline Bardua, 1821

Invitation to the Dance (Aufforderung zum Tanz (Note: The German title sometimes appears as Aufforderung zum Tanze, but this is considered antiquated German.)), Op. 65, J. 260, is a piano piece in rondo form written by Carl Maria von Weber in 1819. It is also well known in the 1841 orchestration by Hector Berlioz. It is sometimes called Invitation to the Waltz, but this is a mistranslation of the original.

The autograph manuscript of the work is preserved in the Morgan Library & Museum.

== Background ==
Weber dedicated Invitation to the Dance to his wife Caroline. He labelled the work "rondeau brillante", and he wrote it while also writing his opera Der Freischütz.

It was the first concert waltz to be written: that is, the first work in waltz form meant for listening rather than for dancing. John Warrack calls it "the first and still perhaps the most brilliant and poetic example of the Romantic concert waltz, creating within its little programmatic framework a tone poem that is also an apotheosis of the waltz in a manner that was to remain fruitful at least until Ravel's choreographic poem, La valse…".

It was also the first piece that, rather than being a tune for the dancers to dance to or a piece of abstract music, was a programmatic description of the dancers themselves.

Invitation to the Dance was part of the repertoire of Franz Liszt, Frédéric Chopin, and many other pianists. It has been recorded by great artists of the past such as Artur Schnabel, Alfred Cortot, Ignaz Friedman and Yvonne Lefébure, through to those of the present day such as Stephen Hough, Jean-François Heisser, Michael Endres, Hamish Milne, and Balázs Szokolay. The Carl Tausig transcription has been recorded by Benno Moiseiwitsch and Philip Fowke.

== Structure ==
The piece was written in D♭ major. It has a slow introduction (Moderato) leading to a fast section (Allegro vivace), then a lilting waltz theme. Other waltz tunes appear, and the fast section, exuberant scale passages (Vivace) and the main waltz theme are all repeated. It comes to a rousing conclusion – or what sounds very much like one – then finishes with a quiet coda once more. Live audiences are prone to applaud at the false conclusion, believing the work is over.

== Program ==
The piece tells the story of a couple at a ball, starting with a young man politely asking a girl for a dance; they take several turns around the room; and they part politely.

Weber gave his wife and dedicatee the following program:

- Bars 1–5: first appearance of the dances
- Bars 5–9: the lady's evasive reply
- Bars 9–13: his pressing invitation
- Bars 13–16: her consent
- Bars 17–19: he begins conversation
- Bars 19–21: her reply
- Bars 21–23: speaks with greater warmth
- Bars 23–25: the sympathetic agreement
- Bars 25–27: addresses her with regard to the dance
- Bars 27–29: her answer
- Bars 29–31: they take their places
- Bars 31–35: waiting for the commencement of the dance.
- The dance
- The conclusion of the dance, his thanks, her reply, and their retirement.

== Orchestration ==
External audio
- You may hear Weber's "Invitation to the Dance" as orchestrated by Hector Berlioz; Here on Archive.org

In 1841, Hector Berlioz was asked to contribute to a production of Weber's opera Der Freischütz at the Paris Opera. It was the practice in France at that time that operas contain a ballet in Act II, which were not always by the same composer but often interpolations by other hands. Berlioz was a great admirer of Weber's, having been disappointed more than once in his quest to meet him, and referring repeatedly in his Treatise on Instrumentation to Weber's works. He agreed to participate, on condition that the opera be performed complete and unadapted (it had been cut and retitled "Robin des bois" for an Odéon production in the 1820s), and that it contain music only by Weber. For the ballet, he orchestrated the piano score of Invitation to the Dance, transposing it from D♭ major to D major, being a more orchestrally manageable key and also producing a brighter sound. He called the ballet L'Invitation à la valse; as a result, the original piano work is sometimes referred to in English as "Invitation to the Waltz", but that is not its correct title.

This production of the opera was first heard on 7 June 1841, but Berlioz's orchestration immediately took on a life of its own, separate from the opera for which it was intended. Berlioz himself frequently conducted his orchestration of Invitation to the Dance in concert. The instrumentation was similar to that which he employed in the "Un bal" movement of his Symphonie fantastique. It was first heard in the US in 1856, in Boston. By contrast, Weber's original piano rondo was not performed at Carnegie Hall until 1898, by Moriz Rosenthal.

Despite the popularity of the Berlioz arrangement, in 1873 Pyotr Ilyich Tchaikovsky described its use in Der Freischütz as "utterly incongruous", "tasteless" and "silly". In 1879 he again criticised the practice, having attended a performance of the opera in Paris in which Gabrielle Krauss sang Agatha. He wrote:

Der Freischütz afforded me great pleasure; in many places in the first act my eyes were moist with tears. In the second act Krauss pleased me greatly by her wonderful rendition of Agathe's aria. The Wolf's Glen was staged not at all as splendidly as I had expected. The third act was curious because of the French brazenness with which they took the liberty, on the one hand, of inserting Invitation à la valse with the most stupid dances, and, on the other, of cutting out the role of the hermit who appears at the end for the dénouement.

== Ballet version ==
In 1911, Michel Fokine used Berlioz's orchestration of Weber's Invitation to the Dance for a ballet for Sergei Diaghilev's Ballets Russes, which he titled Le Spectre de la Rose. The scenario was based on a poem by Théophile Gautier, which was also the basis of a song that Berlioz had set as part of his cycle Les nuits d'été. The principal roles were created by Tamara Karsavina and Vaslav Nijinsky, and the designs were by Léon Bakst. It premiered at Monte Carlo on 19 April 1911.

The 1946 film Specter of the Rose, directed by Ben Hecht, is unrelated to the ballet in its plot, but excerpts from the ballet and the Weber/Berlioz music are featured. The film score proper was written by George Antheil.

== Other versions ==
=== Orchestral ===
Joseph Lanner quoted Invitation to the Dance in his waltz Aufforderung zum Tänze, Op. 7.

In 1849, August Bournonville produced for the Royal Danish Ballet a vaudeville ballet called Le Conservatoire, which uses Holger Simon Paulli's orchestrations of various pieces, including Invitation to the Dance, and works by Chopin and Pierre Rode.

Felix Weingartner also orchestrated the piece.

=== Piano ===
Adolf von Henselt produced an arrangement more suited for a virtuoso pianist.

Carl Tausig also wrote his own transcription.

Leopold Godowsky wrote a "Contrapuntal Paraphrase on C.M. Weber's Invitation to the Dance", for two pianos, with an optional part for a third piano.

=== Vocal ===
It has been arranged for mixed voices SATB by Louis Lavater.

=== Other ===
Benny Goodman based his theme song for the radio program Let's Dance on Invitation to the Dance.

== Legacy ==
Invitation to the Dance lent the waltz a degree of respectability it hitherto lacked, and it was a precursor for the waltzes of Frédéric Chopin and others.

Film biographies of Carl Maria von Weber have appeared under the titles Aufforderung zum Tanz (1934), and Invitation to the Waltz (1935).

The Gene Kelly all-dance anthology film Invitation to the Dance, released in 1956, took its name from the piece and used it in the opening credits.
