= Veg-O-Matic =

Pioneering kitchen appliance marketed via infomercials

Veg-O-Matic is the name of one of the first food-processing appliances to gain widespread use in the United States. It was non-electric and invented by Samuel J. Popeil and later sold by his son Ron Popeil along with more than 20 other distributors across the country, and Ronco, making its debut in 1963 at the International Housewares Show in Chicago, Illinois. It was also sold in Australia by Philip Kives, who purchased it from Samuel Popeil and sold it as one of the first products through his own marketing firm, K-tel.

Made famous by saturation television advertising in the mid- and late 1960s, Veg-O-Matic is a manually operated food slicer, primarily made of injection-molded plastic, which held two sets of parallel cutting blades. The Veg-O-Matic had an integral operating handle. The item to be cut, such as a potato, is placed on the top set of blades, and then is pushed vertically down through the blades by the handle, while the user's hands are kept safely away from the cutter by the shape of the handle.

The steel cutting blades are contained in a circular, cast-metal holder several inches in diameter. By rotating the top holder, the blades could cut flat slices or square strips, such as for French fries. By putting the slices through the machine a second time, they would be diced into small cubes. In the ads, Popeil would rapidly demonstrate this, with the now well-known catchphrase "It slices! It dices!". Sales were nearly exclusively via direct marketing, and Veg-O-Matic was one of the first products (if not the first) to bear the red-and-white "As Seen on TV" logo on the box.

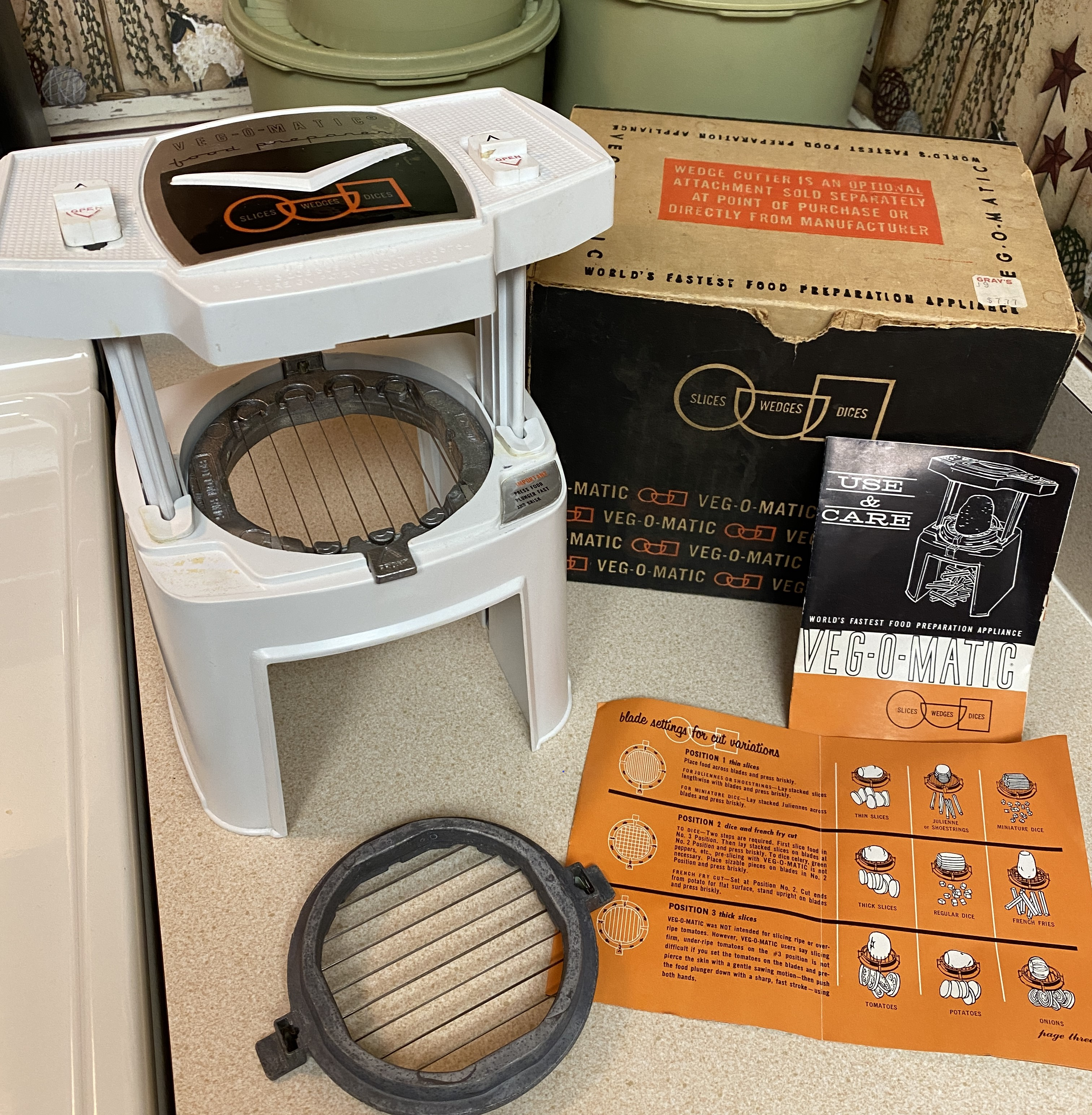
Veg-O-Matic from 1963 with original box, parts, and manual

== In popular culture ==
The "It slices! It dices!" catchphrase is used tongue-in-cheek to satirize Veg-O-Matic ads:

- The ads for Veg-O-Matic inspired comedian Gallagher to create his trademark "Sledge-O-Matic" act
- Dan Aykroyd was a fast-talking commercial pitchman in the famous "Super Bass-O-Matic 76" sketch on Saturday Night Live
- Throughout the 1980s, Frank Zappa satirized the product, as exemplified by recordings on You Can't Do That on Stage Anymore, Vol. 3 and 4. The text of the songs were often modified ad-lib
- Jonathan Richman recorded a song, "Dodge Veg-O-Matic," in the 1970s
- A song by Steve Goodman entitled "Vegematic", written by Goodman, Shel Silverstein and Mike Smith, appeared on Goodman's 1984 album Affordable Art
- In the 1990 Teenage Mutant Ninja Turtles movie, Michelangelo jokes "It slices, it dices, it makes french fries in three different..." while Leonardo is cutting a pizza into slices with his katanas
- The phrase "It slices, it dices, it splices your multimedia data, it'll even julienne fries!" was used in a TV advertisement for the Ultimedia M57SLC computer in the early 1990s
- A gag at the start of the Disney movie Aladdin has a salesman at a bazaar stating, "Look at this! Look at this! Combination hookah and coffee maker! Also makes julienne fries!! Will not break. (clonk clonk) Will not b— It broke."
- The second VeggieTales episode, called God Wants Me to Forgive Them?!, features a sketch advertising an invention called the Forgive-O-Matic, fitting in with the tape's theme of forgiveness. Just like other parodies of the Veg-O-Matic commercial, it has outlandish features like being able to turn into a Chia Pet.
- "Weird Al" Yankovic recorded a song called "Mr. Popeil" for his 1984 album In 3-D.
- Radioactive Chicken Heads recorded the song "Veg-O-Matic" in 1994 on their first demo tape.

== Bibliography ==
- Mateja, Andrew (2013). The Rise and Fall of the First Popeil Gadget Dynasty. Tate Publishing. ISBN 9781625103628.
