= Elgort =

Elgort is a surname. Notable people with the surname include:

- Ansel Elgort (born 1994), American actor and singer
- Arthur Elgort (born 1940), American fashion photographer, father of Ansel

== See also ==
- Elgart
