= Charles Albertine =

American composer and arranger (1929–1986)

- Born: February 24, 1929; Passaic, New Jersey, U.S.
- Died: May 18, 1986 (aged 57)
- Genres: Film score; Pop
- Occupations: Musician, composer, arranger
- Instruments: Piano, oboe, saxophone
- Years active: 1948–1986

Charles Albertine (February 24, 1929 – May 18, 1986) was an American musician, composer, and arranger of the space-age pop era. He is best known as an arranger for Les and Larry Elgart, Sammy Kaye, and The Three Suns, and as the composer of Bandstand Boogie. He also composed music for many television shows.

== Early life and career ==
Albertine was born in Passaic, New Jersey. He began playing piano at age five, and after high school played oboe with the Radio City Music Hall band. He played tenor saxophone with the Sammy Kaye band in the late 1940s, and became the arranger for Les Elgart's swing band in 1952. In the 1950s and 60s, he arranged and composed on recordings for Les and Larry Elgart, Sammy Kaye, The Three Suns and others. His compositions were recorded by artists as diverse as Chet Atkins, Bud Powell, Barry Manilow, and Lawrence Welk.

The Albertine family moved to Los Angeles in 1964, and Albertine began writing music for television shows such as Bewitched, I Dream of Jeannie, and others. Two of his best-known compositions were "Bandstand Boogie" (a tune he wrote for the Elgarts), which was later used by Dick Clark as the theme for his long-running American Bandstand; and the theme to the soap opera Days of Our Lives, which he wrote with Tommy Boyce and Bobby Hart.

== Discography ==
=== As composer ===
- Larry Elgart And His Ensemble – Impressions Of Outer Space - Brunswick BL-58054 (1953)
- Les Elgart and His Orchestra - Bandstand Boogie ("American Bandstand" theme) - Columbia 4-40180 (1954)
- Larry Elgart And His Ensemble – Music for Barefoot Ballerinas and Others - Decca DL-8034 (1955)
- Al Nevins and His Orchestra - Blues for the G-String ("NBC Saturday Night at the Movies" theme) - RCA Victor 47-7663 (1958)
- Harry James - The Spectacular Sounds of Harry James - MGM Records SE-3897 (1961)
- Charles Albertine - Theme from The Long Ships - Colpix CP-726 (1964)

=== As arranger ===
(in addition to arranging these LP's, they usually feature one or more Albertine original compositions)

- Les Elgart and His Orchestra - Sophisticated Swing - Columbia CL-536 (1953)
- Larry Elgart And His Ensemble – Until the Real Thing Comes Along - Decca DL 5526 (1954)
- Les Elgart and His Orchestra - Band of the Year - Columbia CL-619 (1954)
- Les Elgart and His Orchestra - The Dancing Sound - Columbia CL-684 (1955)
- Les Elgart and His Orchestra - The Elgart Touch - Columbia CL-875 (1956)
- Les Elgart and His Orchestra - The Most Happy Fella - Columbia CL-904 (1956)
- Les Elgart and His Orchestra - For Dancers Only - Columbia CL-1008 (1956)
- Les and Larry Elgart - Les & Larry Elgart & Their Orchestra - Columbia CS-8092 (1957)
- Les Elgart and His Orchestra - The Great Sound Of Les Elgart - Columbia CS-8159 (1959)
- Les Elgart and His Orchestra - Half Latin - Half Satin - Columbia CS-8367 (1960)
- Les and Larry Elgart - Command Performance - Columbia CS-9021 (1964)
- Les and Larry Elgart - The New Elgart Touch - Columbia CS-9101 (1965)
- Les and Larry Elgart - Elgart Au Go-Go - Columbia CS-9155 (1965)
- Al Nevins and His Orchestra - Dancing With the Blues - RCA Victor LSP-1654 (1958)
- The Three Suns - Love in the Afternoon - RCA Victor LSP-1669 (1959)
- The Three Suns - A Ding Dong Dandy Christmas - RCA Victor LSP-2054 (1959)
- The Three Suns - Twilight Memories - RCA Victor LSP-2120 (1960)
- The Three Suns - On a Magic Carpet - RCA Victor LSP-2235 (1960)
- The Three Suns - Fever and Smoke - RCA Victor LSP-2310 (1961)
- The Three Suns - Fun in the Sun - RCA Victor LSP-2437 (1961)
- The Three Suns - Movin' and Groovin' - RCA Victor LSA-2532 (1962)
- The Three Suns - Warm and Tender - RCA Victor LSP-2617 (1962)
- Sammy Kaye - New Twists on Old Favorites - Decca DL-74247 (1962)
- Sammy Kaye - Come Dance with Me - Decca DL-74357 (1962)
- Sammy Kaye - Come Dance to the Hits - Decca DL-74502 (1964)
- Sammy Kaye - Come Dance with Me, No. 2 - Decca DL-74590 (1965)
- Sammy Kaye - Dancetime - Decca DL-74655 (1965)
- Sammy Kaye - Shall We Dance? - Decca DL-74754 (1966)
- Sammy Kaye - Let's Face the Music and Dance - Decca DL-74823 (1967)
- Sammy Kaye - Swing and Sway in Hawaii - Decca DL-74862 (1967)
- Sammy Kaye - Dance and Be Happy! - Decca DL-74924 (1967)
- Sammy Kaye - The Glory of Love - Decca DL-74970 (1967)
- Sammy Kaye - Music from "Sweet Charity" - Decca DL-75074 (1969)
- Beverly Kenney - Born to be Blue - Decca 78850 (1959)
- Big Sam Marowitz and His Alto Sax - Sounds in the Night - Roulette SR-25099 (1960)
- Jane Morgan - Jane Morgan Serenades The Victors - Colpix SCP-460 (1963)
- Burl Ives - Burl's Broadway - Decca DL-74876 (1967)

=== As artist ===
- Charles Albertine - The Long Ships - Colpix CP-726 (1964)
- Charles Albertine - Lord Jim / Rue De La Paix - Colpix CP-755 (1965)
- Charles Albertine - Theme from The Pumpkin Eater / Hidden Valley - Colpix CP-766 (1965)
- Charles Albertine - Connoisseur Concerts Presents Three Composers - Palm Records (1985)
- Charles Albertine - In Concert - McDonnell Douglas Physician Systems (1986)
