= Murray Kellner =

American violinist

Background information
- Also known as: Kel Murray
- Born: April 29, 1900; Brooklyn, New York City, United States
- Died: November 20, 1991 (aged 91) Los Angeles, California, US
- Genres: Country, jazz, swing, pop
- Occupation: Musician
- Instrument: Violin
- Years active: c.1925–1970
- Labels: Victor, Gennett, Edison, Royale, Sonora, etc.
- Formerly of: Vernon Dalhart

Murray Kellner (April 29, 1900 – November 20, 1991) was an American violinist who had a long and prolific career on records and radio from the 1920s to the 1970s as an orchestral director, session musician and arranger. He was sometimes credited as Kellner Murray.

== Biography ==
Born in Brooklyn, New York, the son of Russian Jewish emigrants, he first recorded as an accompanist to Vernon Dalhart, one of the most popular singers of the era. Kellner appeared on over 500 recordings with Dalhart between 1925 and 1928, some also with Carson Robison, as well as recording over the same period for Victor Records with Billy Murray, Frank Luther, Kate Smith and others. He also made recordings for Gennett including the traditional tune "Hell Broke Loose in Georgia", on which he was billed as "The Fiddlin' Cowboy".

In the 1920s and 1930s, he made numerous recordings both of dance tunes and jazz, under his own name and as a session musician. He recorded for Edison Records as the leader of the Murray Kellner Dinner Music Ensemble, and was also a member of a Paul Whiteman-sponsored studio group, The Virginians. In the mid-1930s, he led one of the orchestras on the popular NBC radio show Let's Dance. As Kel Murray, he recorded numerous sessions for the Royale label set up by Eli Oberstein, and also for the Sonora label including the 1945 album Dinner Music, a set of 10-inch records.

He moved to Hollywood after World War II, and maintained a high profile as a session musician, recording with such stars as Frank Sinatra, Ella Fitzgerald, Bing Crosby, Judy Garland, Nat King Cole, Doris Day and Bobby Darin. According to Tom Lord's Jazz Discography, Kellner appeared on 120 sessions between 1925 and 1970, but this excludes sessions not categorized as jazz. Eugene Chadbourne wrote: "If a musician's popularity was based purely on a system of tallying up each time their playing had been heard by an individual set of ears, then perhaps the superstars of the music business would be people such as... Murray Kellner".

Kellner died in Los Angeles in 1991.
