= Gallagher (comedian) =

American comedian (1946–2022)

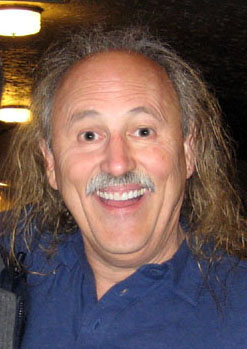
- Gallagher in 2007
- Born: Leo Anthony Gallagher Jr. July 24, 1946; Fort Bragg, North Carolina, U.S.
- Died: November 11, 2022 (aged 76); Palm Desert, California, U.S.
- Education: University of South Florida (BS)
- Occupation: Comedian
- Years active: 1969–2020
- Spouses: Deedra Kay Higgins (m. 1980); Geralyn Ann Hines (m. 1988)
- Children: 2
- Website: gallaghersmash.com

Leo Anthony Gallagher Jr. (July 24, 1946 – November 11, 2022), known simply as Gallagher, was an American comedian known for his prop-based and observational style. His signature routine involved the "Sledge-O-Matic", a large mallet-like tool which he used to smash various items, most notably watermelons. For more than 30 years, he played between 100 and 200 shows a year, destroying tens of thousands of melons.

== Early life ==
Gallagher was born in Fort Bragg, North Carolina, on July 24, 1946, to a family of Irish and Croatian heritage. Until the age of nine, he lived in Lorain, Ohio, but because of his asthma, the family moved to Tampa, Florida, where he attended Henry B. Plant High School in south Tampa. He went on to graduate from the University of South Florida with a chemical engineering degree in 1970. He minored in English literature.

== Career ==
After college, Gallagher began working as comic/musician Jim Stafford's road manager. Stafford and Gallagher traveled to California in 1969; during which time, Gallagher decided to perform as well. He began honing his own comedy act while frequenting both The Comedy Store and The Ice House. He performed twice on The Tonight Show when Johnny Carson was hosting, though Carson disliked prop comedy. He first appeared on the show on December 5, 1975, when he demonstrated his prop, "The Tonight Show Home Game", and again on May 9, 1979. He also performed several times on the show when guest hosts were filling in for Carson. Additionally, Gallagher made appearances on The Mike Douglas Show, The Merv Griffin Show, The Smothers Brothers Comedy Hour, and at the Playboy Clubs.

In contrast to other popular stand-up comics of the era who transitioned to sitcom and movie roles, Gallagher remained mostly a touring comedian, and he once noted that he performed "200 shows a year for 35 years." Per Variety magazine, he did over 3,500 live shows over the course of his career.

Running for governor (as an independent) in the 2003 California gubernatorial recall election, Gallagher finished 16th out of 135 candidates with 5,466 votes.

=== Comedy style ===
Proclaiming himself the "Wizard of Odd," Gallagher was known for "witty wordplay" and sharp observational comedy, but his signature act involved the use of the "Sledge-O-Matic", a large wooden mallet that he used to smash a variety of food items and other objects, culminating with a watermelon. His favored targets also included oranges, cottage cheese, pound cake, beans, cheeseburgers, tubes of toothpaste, video game controllers, and grapes. The Sledge-O-Matic act, an example of physical prop comedy, was a parody of the unintentionally humorous advertisements for the Ronco Veg-O-Matic, a kitchen tool that was heavily advertised on U.S. television from the mid-1960s through the 1970s. Gallagher's audiences were often issued ponchos, or knew to bring raincoats, to prepare for debris cast off into the audience. He dubbed the front row of his shows "Death Row". His show also featured a variety of props, including a large trampoline designed to look like a couch. Gallagher wrote his own jokes and toured with as many as 15 footlockers of props.

In July 1999, he performed a show in Cerritos, California, in which he used stereotypes that were considered offensive towards Mexicans. In January 2011, Gallagher walked out of comedian Marc Maron's WTF podcast when Maron continued to ask Gallagher about the controversial jokes after Gallagher had responded that, out of a two-to-three-hour show, there were only five jokes, which he had "heard on the street". In a subsequent interview that touched on the incident, Gallagher accused Maron of "taking the other side of everything". In subsequent years, Gallagher's routine was criticized for frequent homophobia, paranoid overtones, and racism.

In July 2012, Gallagher was featured in a television commercial for GEICO Insurance, repeating his Sledge-O-Matic routine.

Despite serious cardiac issues he experienced in his 60s and early 70s, Gallagher continued to tour until 2020, when the COVID-19 pandemic forced him to stop.

=== Sledge-O-Matic ===
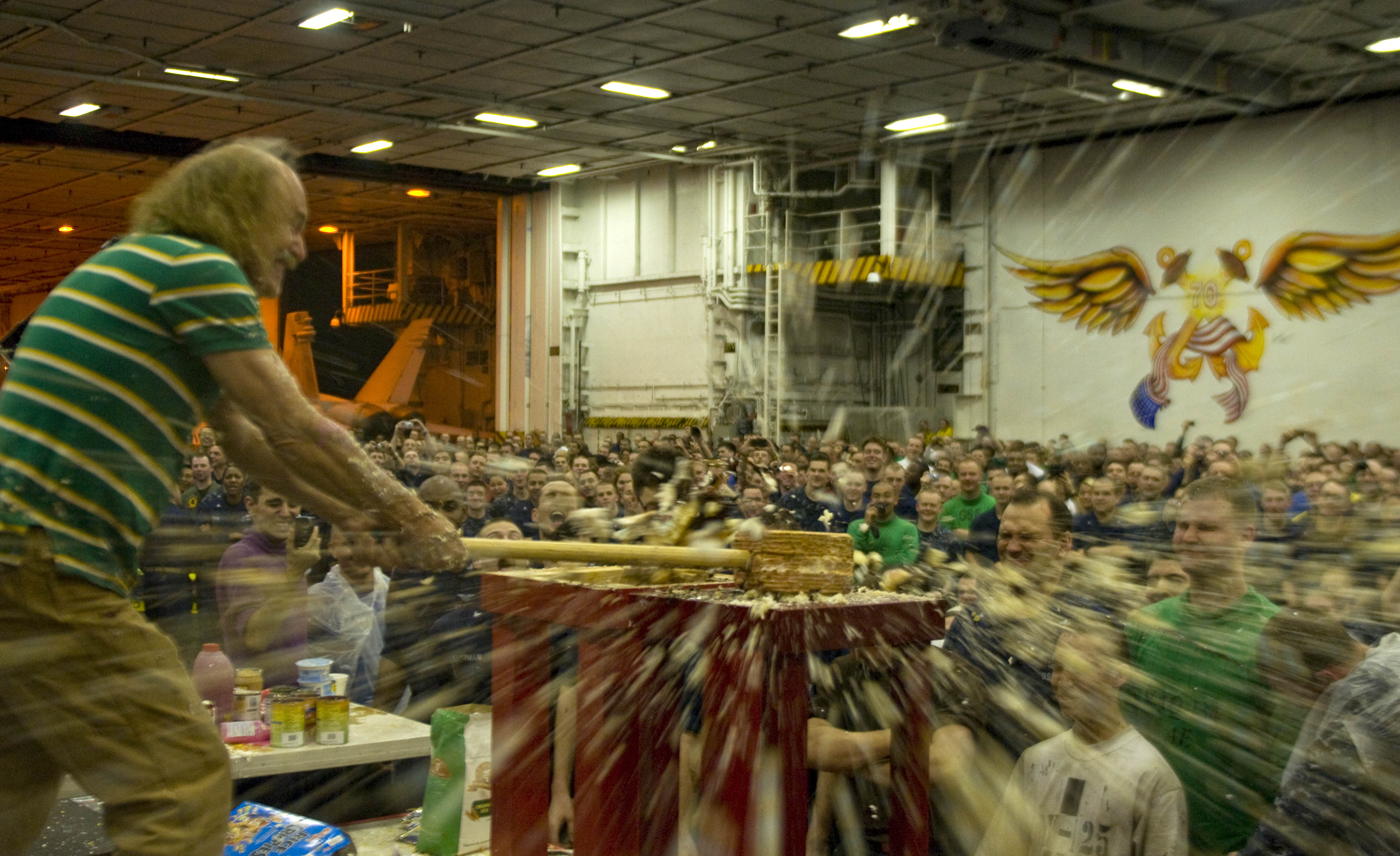
Gallagher smashes a cake with the Sledge-O-Matic.

Though it varied from performance to performance, Gallagher would usually end each of his shows with his signature "Sledge-O-Matic" routine.

It traditionally began with the following preamble:

Ladies and gentlemen! I did not come here tonight just to make you laugh. I came here to sell you something and I want you to pay particular attention!

The amazing Master Tool Corporation, a subsidiary of Fly-By-Night Industries, has entrusted who? Me! To show you! The handiest and the dandiest kitchen tool you've ever seen. And don't you wanna know how it works!?

Well, first you get out an ordinary apple. You place the apple between the patented pans. Then you reach for the tool that is not a slicer, is not a dicer, is not chopper in a hopper! What in the hell could it possibly be?! The Sledge-O-Matic!

Gallagher would then produce a large, usually wooden, mallet, roughly the size of a sledgehammer, and smash it down onto the apples, hurling chunks of produce into the audience. People in the first several rows were usually prepared to be splattered by opening umbrellas, wearing raincoats, or raising plastic sheeting. Fans called the experience "Gallagherizing".

The entire routine was inspired by infomercials which peddled novelty household products and whose popularity peaked in the late 1970s/early 1980s before waning during the 1990s.

=== Audience injuries ===
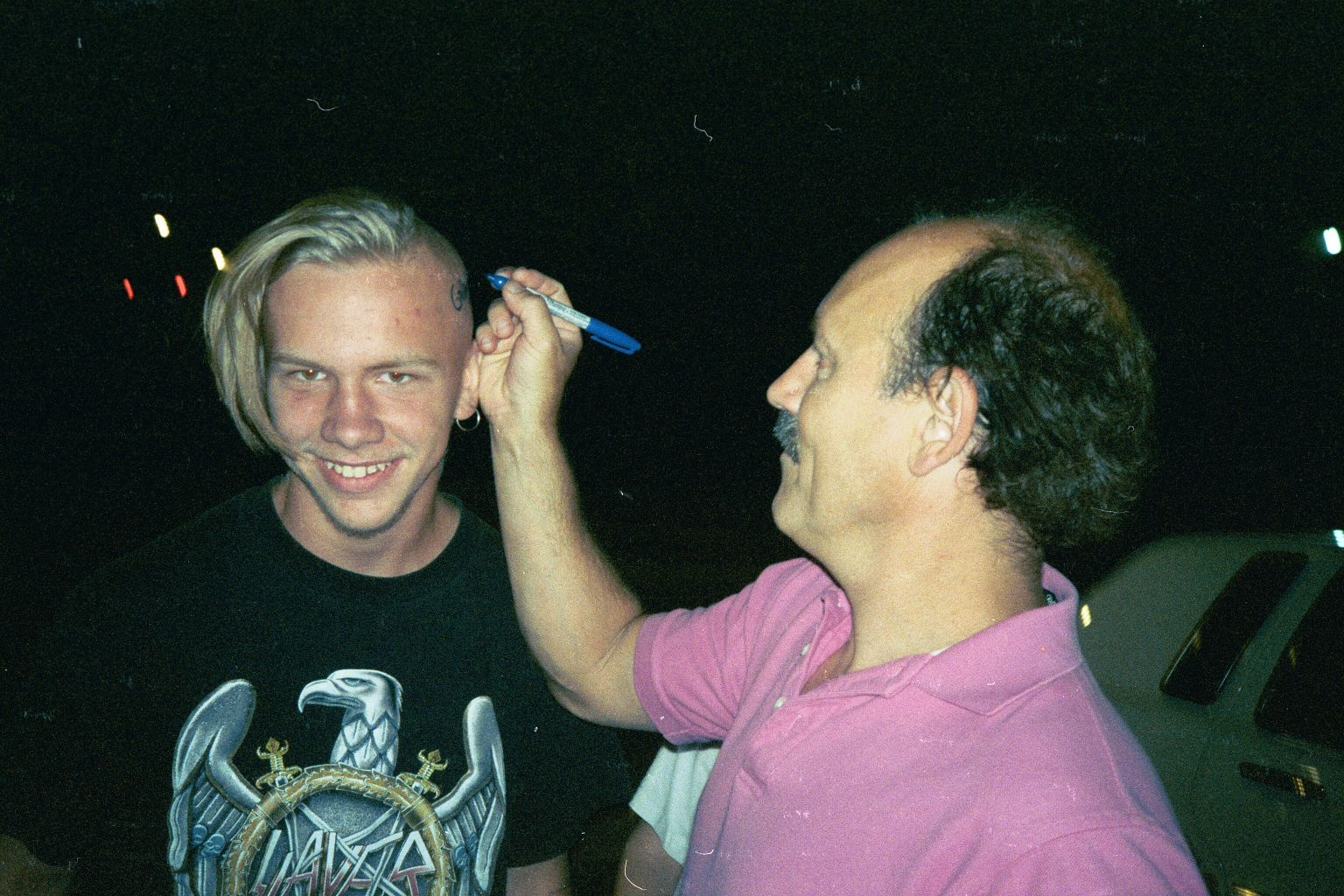
Gallagher signs the head of a fan.

On some occasions audience members sustained injuries during Gallagher's performances.

At a show at the Coach House in San Juan Capistrano, California, on September 29, 1990, a woman in the audience was struck on the head by a heavy plush penguin that had a fire extinguisher inside it. She later sued the comedian for $13,000 in medical bills, $20,000 in lost wages, and punitive damages reportedly in excess of $100,000. The case went to trial in 1993, with the jury ultimately siding with Gallagher, following a raucous trial where Gallagher took the stand and reportedly got as many laughs as he would during one of his shows. The presiding judge, William Froeberg, later said "... in seven years on the bench, I've seen a lot of characters, but none so theatrical ... It was entertaining. It certainly wasn't boring."

At a show at the Washington County Fair in Hillsboro, Oregon, on July 8, 2010, a woman rushed the stage, slipped on debris, and was taken to the hospital for her injuries.

== Conflict with brother ==
In the early 1990s, Gallagher's younger brother Ron, who shared a strong likeness to Leo, asked him for permission to perform shows using Gallagher's trademark Sledge-O-Matic routine. Leo granted his permission on the condition that Ron and his manager clarified in promotional materials that it was Ron Gallagher, not Leo Gallagher, who was performing. Ron typically performed in venues smaller than those in which Leo Gallagher performed. After several years, Ron began promoting his act as Gallagher Too or Gallagher Two. In some instances, Ron's act was promoted in a way that left unclear the fact that he was not the original Gallagher.

Leo initially responded by requesting only that his brother not use the Sledge-O-Matic routine. Ron nonetheless continued to tour as Gallagher Too using the routine. In August 2000, Leo sued his brother for trademark violations and false advertising. The courts ultimately sided with Leo, and granted an injunction prohibiting Ron from performing any act that impersonated his brother in small clubs and venues. This injunction also prohibited Ron from intentionally bearing likeness to Leo.

== Legacy ==
In 2004, Comedy Central rated Gallagher the 100th best stand-up comedian of all time. Gallagher was displeased with being ranked so low, and he told The Oregonian, "I looked at the other people and I was trying to find anyone I ever heard of. How could I be behind people I never heard of? ... I made 13 one-hour shows for Showtime, which are available on videotape. I invented the one-man show on cable."

Gallagher is portrayed by Paul F. Tompkins in the 2022 movie Weird: The Al Yankovic Story.

Announcing his death on November 11, 2022, his manager said that while Gallagher had his detractors, "He was an undeniable talent and an American success story".

Gallagher appeared in an episode of the American television series "American Dad!" 4 months after his death, in the episode "Stan Fixes a Shingle."

== Scientific study ==
In the 1980s, researchers at Loma Linda University used Gallagher's comedy to study laughter's effect on the body. Taking blood samples from ten medical school students while they watched Gallagher in action, the researchers observed the subjects' white blood cells increasing. The scientists said that laughing appeared to have boosted their immune systems.

== Personal life ==
Gallagher said he lost nearly all of his fortune speculating on the stock market, and joked that he was "broke". However, his long-time manager disputed this as a bit of comedic exaggeration, adding, "We all need to be as broke as Leo."

During a performance on March 10, 2011, in Rochester, Minnesota, Gallagher collapsed on stage, clutching his chest. He was rushed to Saint Marys Hospital, where it was determined that he had suffered a minor heart attack.

A year later, on March 14, 2012, just before a performance in Lewisville, Texas, Gallagher began to experience intense chest pains. Gallagher's manager said the comic suffered a "mild to serious" heart attack and was placed in the hospital in a medically induced coma while doctors tried to determine what was wrong with his heart. After replacing two coronary stents, doctors slowly brought him out of the coma on March 18, 2012. He quickly recovered and started talking to his family. His manager, Christine Sherrer, stated that he was breathing on his own, moving, and telling jokes.

Gallagher died in Palm Desert, California, on November 11, 2022, at the age of 76. The cause of death was organ failure.

== Filmography ==
=== Comedy specials ===
- An Uncensored Evening (1980)
- Cosmos (1980)
- Mad as Hell (1981)
- Two Real (1981)
- Totally New (1982)
- That's Stupid (1982)
- Stuck in the Sixties (1983)
- The Maddest (1983)
- Melon Crazy (1984)
- Over Your Head (1984)
- The Bookkeeper (1985)
- The Messiest (1986); contains clips from previous specials
- Overboard (1987)
- We Need a Hero (1992)
- Smashing Cheeseheads (1997)
- Messin' Up Texas (1998)
- Sledge-O-Matic.com (2000)
- Tropic of Gallagher (2007)
- Gotham Comedy Live (2014); episode "Gallagher" recorded on October 9 at the Gotham Club in Chelsea in New York City

=== Acting performances ===
- Record City (1978)
- Double Suicide (1982 short film)
- The Smothers Brothers Comedy Hour (1988 TV series); 1 episode
- NONtourage (2011 short film)
- The Book of Daniel (2013) as Astrologer-Abib

=== Other ===
- Match Game-Hollywood Squares Hour (1983) – game show participant / celebrity guest star
- Tosh.O (2010) – cameo
- The Eric Andre Show (2013) – cameo
- Celebrity Big Brother 2 (2019) – guest, performed Sledge-O-Matic routine for a Power of Veto Comp
