= Let's Dance (Benny Goodman song) =

Song

Single by Benny Goodman
- B-side: "Boy Meets Horn"
- Released: 1939
- Recorded: 1934–35 ff. (broadcast recordings). October 24, 1939 (Columbia studio recording)
- Genre: Swing
- Length: 2:31
- Label: Columbia
- Songwriter(s): Gregory Stone, Joseph Bonine

"Let's Dance" is a jazz standard, an instrumental, used by Benny Goodman as his opening theme for over 50 years.

== Background ==
"Let's Dance" was adapted from the piece Invitation to the Dance by Carl Maria von Weber, and given the name of the radio program Benny Goodman performed on from 1934-1935, Let's Dance. Goodman used "Let's Dance" as an opening for almost all of his performances, eventually becoming his official theme song. The song was composed by Gregory Stone and Joseph Bonime, with lyrics written by Fanny May Baldridge. Goodman never recorded the theme with the lyrics, although The Modernaires recorded it in a tribute to him in 1954.

== See also ==
- List of 1930s jazz standards
