= Larry Elgart =

American jazz bandleader (1922–2017)

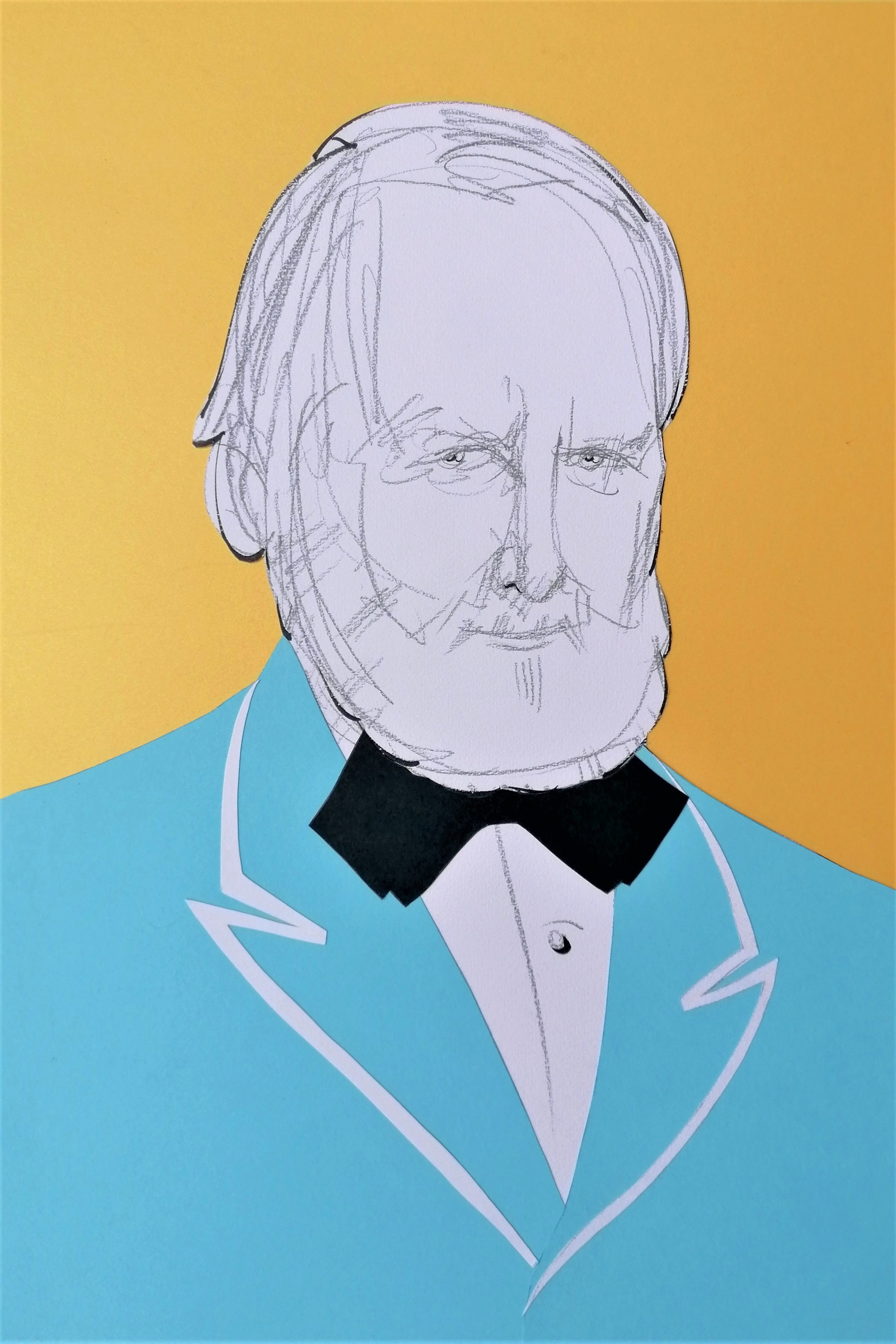
- Portrait of Elgart

Background information
- Born: Lawrence Joseph Elgart; March 20, 1922; New London, Connecticut, U.S.
- Died: August 29, 2017 (aged 95) Sarasota, Florida, U.S.
- Genres: Jazz
- Occupations: Musician; bandleader
- Instrument: Alto saxophone
- Years active: 1940s–2000s
- Formerly of: Les Elgart

Lawrence Joseph Elgart (March 20, 1922 – August 29, 2017) was an American jazz bandleader. With his brother Les, he recorded "Bandstand Boogie", the theme to the long-running dance show American Bandstand.

== Biography ==
Elgart was born in New London, Connecticut, in 1922, four years younger than his brother Les, and grew up in Pompton Lakes, New Jersey. Their mother was a concert pianist; their father also played piano, though not professionally. Larry and Les both attended Pompton Lakes High School. Both brothers began playing in jazz ensembles in their teens, and a young Larry played with jazz musicians including Charlie Spivak, Woody Herman, Red Norvo, Freddie Slack, and Tommy Dorsey.

In the mid-1940s, Les and Larry formed their own ensemble, hiring Nelson Riddle, Bill Finegan, and Ralph Flanagan to arrange tunes for them. Their ensemble was not successful, and after a few years, they scuttled the band and sold the arrangements they had commissioned to Tommy Dorsey. Both returned to sideman positions in various orchestras.

In 1953, Larry met Charles Albertine and recorded two of his experimental compositions: "Impressions of Outer Space" and "Music for Barefoot Ballerinas". Released on 10″ vinyl, these recordings became collector's items for fans of avant-garde jazz, though they were not commercially successful.

Larry and Albertine put together a more traditional ensemble and began recording them using precise microphone placements, producing what came to be known as the "Elgart Sound". This proved to be very commercially successful, and throughout the 1950s, Larry and Les enjoyed a run of successful albums and singles on the Columbia label. Their initial LP, Sophisticated Swing, released in late 1953, was credited to The Les Elgart Orchestra, because, according to Larry, Les was more interested than his brother in fronting the band.

In 1954, the Elgarts left their permanent mark on music history in recording Albertine's "Bandstand Boogie" for the legendary television show originally hosted by Bob Horn, and two years later, by Dick Clark. In 1956, Clark took the show from its local broadcast in Philadelphia to ABC-TV for national distribution as American Bandstand. He remained host for another 32 years. Variations of the original song surfaced as the show's theme in later years.

In 1955, the band became the "Les and Larry Elgart Orchestra", but the brothers split in 1959, each subsequently releasing his own series of LPs. Larry signed with RCA Victor. His 1959 album, New Sounds at the Roosevelt, was nominated that year for a Grammy Award. From 1960 to 1962, he released music on MGM Records. Larry and Les reunited in 1963 and recorded several more albums, ending with 1967's Wonderful World of Today's Hits, after which they went their separate ways. Les moved to Texas and performed with The Les Elgart Orchestra until his death in 1995.

In 1969, Larry was invited to London to make three records for Swampfire Records under the imprint of Les and Larry Elgart. The albums claimed a "Nashville sound" and bore no relationship to the Elgart Sound of the early 1950s.

In 1981, in a stark departure from the fabled Elgart Sound, Larry produced Flight of the Condor for RCA Victor, described as an album in the Jazz-funk and fusion genres. In a bid to garner interest, RCA released one of the tracks, "No Big Thing", as a 45 rpm single. Billboard magazine said of the release,

This is an intense album that should not be misunderstood. It is not old big band, although it has some roots there. It is not disco-dance, although it has flavorings in that direction, particularly on "No Big Thing." It does have a good deal of Latin flavorings with Elgart's alto sax and Patti Coyle Bunham's wordless high register vocalise blending gracefully.

Elgart's biggest exposure came in 1982, with the smash success of a recording titled "Hooked on Swing". The instrumental was a medley of swing jazz hits that became so popular it even cracked the U.S. Billboard Pop Singles chart (at No. 31) and Adult Contemporary chart (No. 20). This was the final hit for any artist in the year-long "medley craze" that lasted from 1981 to 1982. Billed as "Larry Elgart and His Manhattan Swing Orchestra", the LP from which the tune was taken hit No. 24 on the U.S. charts.

The follow-up, Hooked on Swing 2, did not fare as well. In early 1983, it debuted at No. 161 on the Billboard Top LPs & Tape chart, rising as high as No. 127, then fell off the chart by early summer, perhaps reflecting a fade in the popularity of the medley genre. With release of the "Hooked on" albums, however, Elgart was back on the jazz touring circuit. He continued to tour internationally and record into the 2000s.

A resident of Longboat Key, Florida, Elgart died in 2017 at a hospice center in Sarasota, Florida, at the age of 95.

== Discography ==
- Impressions of Outer Space (Brunswick, 1953)
- Band with Strings (Decca, 1954)
- Until the Real Thing Comes Along (Decca, 1954)
- Larry Elgart & His Orchestra (Decca, 1954)
- Barefoot Ballerina (Decca, 1955)
- Larry Elgart and His Orchestra (RCA Victor, 1959)
- New Sounds at the Roosevelt (RCA Victor, 1959)
- Saratoga (RCA Victor, 1960)
- Easy Goin' Swing (RCA Victor, 1960)
- Sophisticated Sixties (MGM, 1960)
- The Shape of Sounds to Come (MGM, 1961)
- Visions American Legends: A New Look And A New Sound (MGM, 1961)
- Music in Motion! (MGM, 1962)
- More Music in Motion (MGM, 1962)
- The City (MGM, 1963)
- The Larry Elgart Dance Band (Project 3, 1979) – reissue of New Sounds at the Roosevelt
- Flight of the Condor (RCA Victor, 1981)
- Hooked on Swing (RCA Victor, 1982)
- Hooked on Swing 2 (RCA Victor, 1983)
- Larry Elgart and His Swing Orchestra (RCA Victor, 1983)
- Let My People Swing (K-Tel, 1995) – reissue of New Sounds at the Roosevelt
- Live at the Ambassador (Quicksilver, 1998)
- Latin Obsession (Sony, 2000)
- Bandstand Boogie (2003)
- Nashville Country Piano (Swampfire, 1969)
- Nashville Country Brass (Swampfire, 1969)
- Nashville Country Guitars (Swampfire, 1969)
- Bridge over Troubled Water (Swampfire, 1970)

With Les Elgart

- Sophisticated Swing (Columbia, 1953)
- Prom Date (Columbia, 1954)
- Campus Hop (Columbia, 1954)
- More of Les (Columbia, 1955)
- Just One More Dance (Columbia, 1954)
- Bazoom (Columbia, 1954) – EP
- The Band of the Year (Columbia, 1955)
- The Dancing Sound (Columbia, 1955)
- For Dancers Only (Columbia, 1955)
- The Elgart Touch, (Columbia, 1955)
- Les Elgart & His Orchestra Present (Columbia, 1955) – EP
- The Most Happy Fella (Columbia, 1956)
- For Dancers Also (Columbia, 1956)
- Les & Larry Elgart & Their Orchestra (Columbia, 1958)
- Sound Ideas (Columbia, 1958)
- Big Band Hootenany (Columbia, 1963)
- Command Performance (Columbia, 1964)
- The New Elgart Touch (Columbia, 1965)
- Elgart au Go-Go, (Columbia, 1965)
- Sound of the Times (Columbia, 1966)
- Warm and Sensuous (Columbia, 1966)
- Girl Watchers (Columbia, 1967)
- Wonderful World of Today's Hits (Columbia, 1967)

== Bibliography ==
- Elgart, Lynn; Elgart, Larry (2014). The Music Business and the Monkey Business: Recollections. Archway Publishing. ISBN 978-1480812086.
