= Hooked on Classics (series) =

Album series by Royal Philharmonic Orchestra

Hooked on Classics series
- The logo used in the Hooked on Classics series

Studio album series by Royal Philharmonic Orchestra
- Released: 1981–2001
- Genre: Classical disco
- Label: RCA Records
- Producer: Jeff Jarratt

The Hooked on Classics series is a collection of record albums first introduced in 1981, toward the end of the disco era's peak in popularity. The series was disliked by many classical music purists, not least because of the background beat produced by a LinnDrum drum machine, but it had the positive effect of reviving interest in classical music among a new generation. Several volumes in the series were issued. However, interest and sales waned after the initial album. RCA Records issued the series on its Victor label, rather than the Red Seal label, in order to appeal to the wider pop-oriented audience.

== History ==
=== Background ===
In the early 1980s, Hooked on Classics emerged as an unexpected musical sensation. Conceived by producers Don Reedman and Jeff Jarratt, and arranged by Louis Clark of the Electric Light Orchestra, the project fused excerpts of well-known classical works with a steady disco beat. Performed by the Royal Philharmonic Orchestra, the debut album was released in 1981, with its opening track climbing to No. 2 on the UK Singles Chart. The concept drew inspiration from the Dutch production team behind Stars on 45, which had popularized disco medleys of familiar pop songs. Reedman and Jarratt adapted this formula to classical repertoire, creating a new crossover genre.

Louis Clark, formerly an arranger for Electric Light Orchestra, conducted the Royal Philharmonic Orchestra in performances that stitched together recognizable extracts from classical music pieces over a continuous rhythmic pulse—sometimes overtly disco-driven, sometimes more subtle. This approach aligned with the "Symphonic rock" or "orchestrated rock" style, similar to the London Symphony Orchestra’s Classic Rock series, though with fewer electronic effects.

The first three albums achieved notable commercial success. Hooked on Classics peaked at number 4 on the U.S. Billboard albums chart, remained for 68 weeks, and was certified platinum. In Canada, it reached number 5 and stayed in the Top 50 for 31 weeks. Hooked on Classics 2: Can't Stop the Classics peaked at number 33 in the U.S., spending 41 weeks on the chart, and rose to number 4 in Canada, where it spent 14 weeks in the Top 10. It was certified gold. Hooked on Classics 3: Journey Through the Classics reached number 89 in the U.S., charting for 14 weeks, and number 31 in Canada.

The debut single proved especially successful, reaching number 2 on the UK Singles Chart and number 10 on the Billboard Hot 100 in late 1981 and early 1982. Clark produced at least two more albums in 1982 and 1983, while other producers expanded the "Hooked On..." brand into genres such as instrumentals, swing, and country. The series continued into the late 1980s; Hooked on House (1988) paired classical excerpts with house-style rhythms, and in 1989 the orchestra released The Classics in Rhythm, dropping the "Hooked On..." name but maintaining the medley format.

Similar crossover experiments were undertaken by composers including Walter Murphy, Eumir Deodato, and Waldo de los Ríos.

In 2011, Hooked on Classics returned to the stage at the Bournemouth International Centre. Organized by former series performer Andy Smith, the concert celebrated the 30th anniversary of the albums. Louis Clark conducted the English Pops Orchestra, featuring many of the original recording musicians.

== Album listing ==
- Hooked on Classics (1981)
- Hooked on Classics 2: Can't Stop the Classics (1982)
- Hooked on Swing (1982)
- Hooked on Classics 3: Journey Through the Classics (1983)
- Hooked on Swing 2 (1983)
- Hooked on Instrumentals (1983)
- Hooked on Rock Classics (1983)
- Hooked on Number Ones: 100 Non Stop Hits (1984)
- Hooked on Themes (1986)
- Hooked on Dixie (1988)
- Hooked on Rhythm and Classics (1989)
- Hooked on Dancin’ (1989)
- Hooked on Polkas (1989)
- Hooked on Country (1990)
- Hooked On Classics 4: Baroque (1992)
- Hooked On Classics 5 (1993)
- Hooked on Movies (1997)
- Hooked on Classics 2000 (2001)

=== Compilation Albums ===
- The Hooked on Classics Collection (1983)
- More Hooked on Classics (2001)
