= Lisa Popeil =

American voice coach, singer, musician, voice researcher, lecturer (born 1956)

Lisa Stephanie Popeil (born February 24, 1956) is an American voice coach and singer. She is the creator of the trademarked Voiceworks Method and, as a voice coach, specializes in the pedagogy of vocal styles. She attended the California Institute of the Arts where she earned her BFA in General Music and an MFA in Voice. She also sang backup vocals for the "Weird Al" Yankovic song "Mr Popeil".

== Early life and education ==
Popeil was born in Chicago. She is the eldest daughter of inventor S. J. Popeil (1915–1984) and Eloise Popeil (1925–2010). Popeil's half-brother, Ron Popeil, was an inventor and marketer.

Her musical training started at the age of four, when she began studying piano and voice. She attended Sacred Heart Schools and the University of Chicago Laboratory Schools. She moved to Newport Beach, California in 1971 and graduated from Corona del Mar High School. In 1974 she attended Prescott College in Prescott, Arizona, and the California Institute of the Arts, where she earned her BFA in General Music (piano, composition and voice) and an MFA in Voice.

== Career ==
- In 1981, Popeil performed in lingerie with Frank Zappa at the Santa Monica Civic Auditorium and sang Lisa's Life Story, Dangerous Kitchen, and Teenage Prostitute. The latter was included on Zappa's album Ship Arriving Too Late to Save a Drowning Witch which featured Zappa's biggest-selling song Valley Girl. An edited version of Lisa's Life Story appeared on the album You Can't Do That On Stage Anymore, Volume 6 released in 1992. Since 1983, Popeil has sung backup vocals with "Weird Al" Yankovic, notably on the song Mr. Popeil which pays homage to her own father.
- In 1984, Popeil's self-titled album Lisa Popeil, produced by Detroit jazz trumpeter Charles Moore, was released and was featured in Billboard's ‘First Time Around’ section. That record featured Steve Vai and Joe LoDuca as guest musicians. As a classical mezzo-soprano, Popeil appeared at the Getty Center in Los Angeles with the Pasadena Symphony in 1998.
- In 1994, Popeil co-composed (with Bill Montei) the musical score for the sci-fi film CyberTracker, and in 1999 she co-composed the score for Last Chance, written, directed, and starring Bryan Cranston.
- Popeil taught pop and classical voice classes at the College of the Canyons in Santa Clarita, California from 1989 to 1999, private jazz voice at CalArts in 1995, and was an adjunct voice teacher at Pepperdine University in Malibu, California from 2014 to 2015.
- In 1995, Popeil released her Total Singer video/DVD program followed by the educational CD How to Speak Beautifully. In reference to her brother being a pitchman for gadgets, she says she is "The pitch woman of voice".
- As a voice researcher, Ms. Popeil has conducted research with Drs. Johan Sundberg, Ken-Ichi Sakakibara, Matthias Echternach, Jack Jiang, Nathalie Henrich, Steven Feinberg, and Thomas Cleveland.
- Her "Daily Vocal Workout for Pop Singers" CD was released in 2013.
- In 2014, Popeil sang background vocals on "Weird Al" Yankovic's "Tacky", a parody of Pharrell Williams "Happy".
- In 2016, Popeil performed in Oslo, Norway for the ZappaUnion concert reprising her 1981 Frank Zappa performance.
- Popeil presents workshops and lectures widely at international voice conferences such as Voice Foundation, Pan-European Voice Conference, International Congress of Voice Teachers, and National Association of Teachers of Singing, as well as presenting her Total Singer Workshop at universities such as Duke University Voice Care Center in Durham, North Carolina, Gustavus Adolphus College in St. Peter, Minnesota, and at Shenandoah University CCM Vocal Pedagogy Institute in Winchester, Virginia.
- In 2019, Popeil toured as a background singer with "Weird Al" Yankovic on his Strings Attached Tour. Five years later, in 2024, Popeil performed with Stinkfoot Orchestra, a 14-piece Zappa tribute band.

== Honors and awards ==
- In 2006, Popeil received the 'Career Achievement in Vocal Instruction' from the LA Music Awards. She has taught singing to the children of migrant workers as part of the Migrant Education Program, a program of the Los Angeles County Office of Education, and to students at Wayland Baptist University competing for scholarship at the Music Achievement Awards.
- Popeil received the 'Plaque Sergio Rainis' award for her 'Achievements in the Field of Vocal Pedagogy' from the Croatian Choral Directors Association in 2014.

== Writing ==
- "Journal of Singing" – ('Multiplicity of Belting' and 'Differences Between Belting and Classical Voice Production')
- "Journal of Voice" – ('Substyles of Belting: Phonatory and Resonatory Characteristics' with Drs. Johan Sundberg and Margareta Thalen)
- Oxford Handbook of Music Education contributor
- Oxford Handbook of Singing contributor ('Different Sung Genres" with Gillyanne Kayes and Jeremy Fisher of Vocal Process)
- Singer & Musician Magazine contributor
- L2PNet.com contributor
- The Modern Vocalist contributor
- 'But Wait! There's More: The Irresistible Appeal and Spiel of Ronco and Popeil' by Tim Samuelson
- "VoiceCouncilUK" contributor
- "The Ultimate Guide to Singing" – TC Helicon – contributor
- "The Vocal Athlete: Application and Technique for the Hybrid Singer" by Marci Rosenberg and Wendy D. Leborgne – contributor
- "Sing Anything – Mastering Vocal Styles" by Gina Latimerlo and Lisa Popeil
