= Les Elgart =

American swing jazz bandleader and trumpeter (1917–1995)

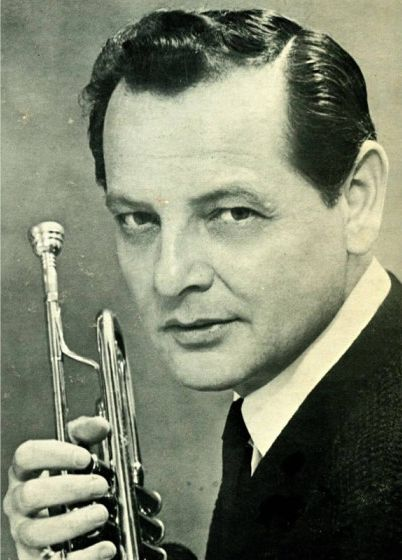
- Born: Lester Elliott Elgart; August 3, 1917; New Haven, Connecticut, U.S.
- Died: July 29, 1995 (aged 77); Dallas, Texas, U.S.
- Occupations: Bandleader; Trumpeter
- Years active: 1940–1995
- Relatives: Larry Elgart (brother)
- Musical career
- Genres: Pop music
- Labels: Musicraft; Bullet(Nashville); Columbia; Priam; Swampfire

Lester Elliott Elgart (August 3, 1917 – July 29, 1995) was an American swing jazz bandleader and trumpeter.

== Early years ==
Born in New Haven, Connecticut, Elgart grew up in Pompton Lakes, New Jersey with his brother Larry. They were exposed to musical influences early in their lives. Their mother, Bessie (Aisman) Elgart, was a concert pianist before her marriage to Arthur Elgart, a manufacturer's representative. She is said to have given a piano recital at Carnegie Hall, and at one time had her own music conservatory. At age 10, Les was attracted to bugling after joining the Cub Scouts. Later, he turned to the cornet, and then the trumpet. Both brothers attended Pompton Lakes High School, where Les was elected president of the school orchestra. He was playing professionally by the age of twenty.

== Career ==
=== The First Band ===
During the 1940s Les was a member of bands led by Raymond Scott, Charlie Spivak, and Harry James, occasionally finding himself alongside brother Larry. They formed their own orchestra in 1945, hiring Nelson Riddle, Ralph Flanagan, and Bill Finegan to write arrangements. The band signed with General Amusement Corporation for bookings, and in May 1945, made recordings in New York City at a V-Disc session. None of these were issued, however.

This was a "sweet band" generally, and far removed from their swing style of a decade later. The band had a familiar Glenn Miller touch to its sound, only a slower tempo.

In mid-1946, Les signed with Musicraft Records but the recordings never made the hit parade. In October 1946, the band recorded a performance for Lang-Worth Transcriptions for radio broadcast. The band performed at venues in New York and northern New Jersey for the next two years, and recorded two singles for Bullet Records in March 1948. With the post-World War II decline in popularity of the big bands of the 30s and 40s, the Les Elgart Orchestra disbanded, and between 1949 and 1952, Les freelanced on record dates, worked in pick-up bands, and contracted for a few singers.

=== The Elgart Sound ===
In late 1952, Larry Elgart was working with fellow saxophonist Charles Albertine in the pit band for the Broadway play ‘’Top Banana’’. Larry said,

We wondered if this was it . . . if this was what we had to do to make a living in the music business. But we knew it wasn’t. And that’s why Les, I and Charlie started a new band with the determination that it had to happen.

With $1,000, they gathered sidemen and recorded three demo tracks to shop the record labels. In April 1953, Columbia Records A&R executive George Avakian liked what he heard, and signed the band to the label. ‘’Sophisticated Swing,’’ the band’s first album, was released that year. It enjoyed immediate success. The Elgart ensemble was lauded as "a new band with a handsome sound and smart arrangements." The band came from nowhere to third place in the 1954 DownBeat Magazine popularity poll, behind the Les Brown Band and the Ray Anthony Orchestra. Elgart displaced Anthony for second place in 1955 and again in 1956.

Over the next three years, the band released a half dozen albums and enjoyed success on tour, with many appearances on college campuses. The band's unique blend of brass and reeds became known as “The Elgart Sound.” The best selling albums were "The Elgart Touch" (1956) and "For Dancers Also" (1957), both of which reached the Top 15 on the LP charts. Among the band's popular tunes was "Bandstand Boogie", which was used by Dick Clark as the theme song for the ABC-TV dance show American Bandstand.

The band's first stereo recording in 1957 reflected a name change to Les and Larry Elgart and Their Orchestra. After the 1958 release of “Sound Ideas,” however, the brothers parted ways, and Larry formed his own band.

The popularity of the Les Elgart Orchestra remained strong. The band took second place, again behind Les Brown, in the 1959 DownBeat poll. In 1960, the band won the Cashbox Magazine award as the Most Programmed Band by America's Disc Jockeys, and the Billboard Magazine award as "America’s Favorite Band 1960 Outstanding Achievement in Recorded Music.”

By the end of the decade, Les quit performing, preferring to handle the business aspects of the band. Under several producers and arrangers, the band released eight more albums.

=== Later years ===
The brothers reunited again in 1963, hiring arrangers Charles Albertine and Bobby Scott. The Les and Larry Elgart Orchestra attempted to align itself with popular music trends such as folk ("Big Band Hootenanny" 1963) and disco ("Elgart Au Go-Go" 1965). Its remaining releases, arrangements of contemporary hits, could be categorized as easy listening. The band performed on the radio between 1964 and 1966, and appeared on a Jackie Gleason television special featuring big bands in November 1966. Veteran Columbia Records producer Teo Macero produced the Elgarts' final three albums for the label. After 1967's The Wonderful World of Today’s Hits, Les and Larry parted again, this time for good.

In 1969, Larry was invited to London to make three records for Swampfire Records under the imprint of Les and Larry Elgart. The albums claimed a Nashville sound and bore no relationship to the Elgart Sound of the early 1950s.

Les Elgart lived in Chicago for several years, and Santa Monica and Hollywood Hills on the West Coast. He returned to Chicago, then relocated to Miami, and San Antonio, Texas. From his home in Dallas, Les continued to tour with his band, performing at colleges and conventions, and on cruises. In 1977 he married Joerene Ingram, who managed the band. In 1987 Les Elgart traveled to Brazil at the invitation of Brazilian radio program producer and Elgart biographer Joaquim Gaspar Machado.

Les continued to work until his death on July 29, 1995, from heart failure, in Dallas, Texas, at age 77.

== Discography ==
(All released on the Columbia label except where noted)

- Sophisticated Swing CL-536 (1953)
- Just One More Dance CL-594 (1954)
- The Band of the Year CL-619 (1954)
- The Dancing Sound CL-684 (1954)
- For Dancers Only CL-803 (1955)
- Prom Date (10" "House Party" Series) CL 2503 (1955)
- The Elgart Touch CL-875 (1956, No. 13 US)
- The Most Happy Fella CL-904 (1956)
- Campus Hop (10" "House Party" Series) CL 2578 (1956)
- More of Les (10" "House Party" Series) CL 2590 (1956)
- For Dancers Also CL-1008 (1957)
- Les & Larry Elgart & Their Orchestra CL-1052 (1958)
- Sound Ideas CL-1123/CS-8002 (1958)
- Les Elgart On Tour CL-1291/CS-8103 (1959)
- The Great Sound of Les Elgart CL-1350/CS-8159 (1959)
- The Band with That Sound CL-1450/CS-8245 (1960)
- Designs for Dancing CL-1500/CS-8291 (1960)
- Half Satin Half Latin CL-1567/CS-8367 (1960)
- It's De-Lovely CL-1659/CS-8459 (1961)
- The Twist Goes to College CL-1785/CS-8585 (1962) (arrangements by George Williams)
- Best Band on Campus CL-1890/CS-8690 (1962)
- Big Band Hootenany CL-2112/CS-8912 (1963)
- Command Performance CL-2221/CS-9021, (1964, No. 128 US)
- The New Elgart Touch CL-2301/CS-9101, (1965) (arrangements by George Williams)
- Elgart au Go-Go CL-2355/CS-9155, (1965)
- Sound of the Times CL-2511/CS-9311, (1966) (arrangements by Bobby Scott)
- Warm and Sensuous CL-2591/CS-9391 (1966) (arrangements by Bobby Scott)
- Girl Watchers CL-2633/CS-9433 (1967) (arrangements by Bobby Scott)
- The Wonderful World of Today's Hits CL-2780/CS-9580 (1967) (arrangements by Bobby Scott)
- Unforgettable Harmony HS 11288 (1968)
- Greatest Hits CS-9722 (1970)
- American Bandstand, Priam PR-218 (1981)
- Nashville Country Piano, Swampfire SF-201 (1969)
- Nashville Country Brass, Swampfire SF-202 (1969)
- Nashville Country Guitars, Swampfire SF-203 (1969)
- Nashville Country Sound: Bridge Over Troubled Water, Swampfire SF-207 (1970)
