= Ron Popeil =

American inventor and marketing personality (1935–2021)

- Born: Ronald Martin Popeil; May 3, 1935; New York City, U.S.
- Died: July 28, 2021 (aged 86); Los Angeles, California, U.S.
- Resting place: Cathedral of Our Lady of the Angels, Los Angeles
- Education: University of Illinois at Urbana-Champaign
- Occupations: Inventor, infomercial salesman
- Known for: Ronco, infomercials
- Spouses: Marilyn Greene (m. 1956; div. 1963); Lisa Boehne (m. 1981; div. 1988); Robin Angers (m. 1995)
- Children: 5
- Relatives: Lisa Popeil (half-sister); Ashley Tisdale (second cousin once removed); Jennifer Tisdale (second cousin once removed)

Ronald Martin Popeil (/poʊˈpiːl/ poh-PEEL; May 3, 1935 – July 28, 2021) was an American inventor and marketing personality, and founder of the direct response marketing company Ronco. He made appearances in infomercials for the Showtime Rotisserie and coined the phrase "Set it, and forget it!" as well as popularizing the phrase, "But wait, there's more!" on television as early as the mid-1950s.

== Personal life and career ==
Popeil was born to a Jewish family in Manhattan in 1935, the son of Julia (née Schwartz) and Samuel Popeil. When he was six, his parents divorced and Popeil and his brother went to Florida to live with their grandparents. Popeil has a younger half-sister, musician and voice coach Lisa Popeil (b. 1956), from his father's second marriage. At age 17 in 1952, Popeil went with his grandparents to work for his father at his company's (Popeil Brothers) manufacturing facility in Chicago. His grandparents later returned to Florida and Popeil remained with his father.

When Popeil was 18, he attended the University of Illinois Urbana-Champaign and joined Alpha Epsilon Pi before withdrawing after six months.

After returning from college, Popeil continued to work and learn from his father, who was also an inventor and salesman of numerous kitchen-related gadgets, such as the Chop-O-Matic and the Veg-O-Matic. The Chop-O-Matic retailed for US$3.98 and sold over two million units.

The invention of the Chop-O-Matic caused a problem that marked the entrance of Ron Popeil into television. The Chop-O-Matic was so efficient at chopping vegetables that it was impractical for salesmen to carry all the vegetables needed for the demonstrations over the course of a day. The solution was to tape the demonstration. Once the demonstration was taped, it was a short step to broadcasting it as a TV commercial.

Popeil initially operated as a distributor of his father's kitchen products and later formed his own company, Ronco, in 1964. He continued as a distributor for his father and added additional products from other manufacturers. Popeil and his father became competitors in the 1970s for the same retail store business.

Popeil received the Ig Nobel Prize in Consumer Engineering in 1993. The awards committee described him as the "incessant inventor and perpetual pitchman of late night television" and awarded the prize in recognition of his "redefining the industrial revolution" with his devices. Popeil was a past member of the board of directors of Mirage Resorts, where he served for 22 years under Steve Wynn, as well as a past member of the board of directors of MGM Hotels for seven years under Kirk Kerkorian. Popeil became the recipient of the Electronic Retail Association's Lifetime Achievement award in 2001, and he is listed in the Direct Response Hall of Fame.

Popeil was previously a member of the advisory board for University of California, Los Angeles' Business, Management, and Legal Programs. In August 2005, he sold his company, Ronco, to Fi-Tek VII, a Denver holding company, for US$55 million, with plans to continue serving as the spokesman and inventor while being able to spend more time with his family.

In 1956, Popeil married Marilyn Greene, with whom he had two daughters; they divorced in 1963. Popeil married Lisa Boehne sometime after this and had one daughter with her. They got divorced sometime before 1995, when he married Robin Angers, with whom he had two more daughters. Ashley Tisdale and Jennifer Tisdale are Popeil's cousins.

== Death ==
Popeil died on July 28, 2021, at Cedars-Sinai Medical Center; he was 86 years old. Popeil had been sent there a day earlier for a medical emergency. No cause of death was given. According to his half-sister, Lisa Popeil, the cause of death was a brain hemorrhage.

== Inventions ==
Popeil is noted for marketing and in some cases inventing a wide variety of products. Among the better known and more successful are the Chop-O-Matic hand food processor ("Ladies and gentlemen, I'm going to show you the greatest kitchen appliance ever made ... All your onions chopped to perfection without shedding a single tear."), the Dial-O-Matic successor to the Veg-O-Matic ("Slice a tomato so thin it only has one side."), and the Ronco Pocket Fisherman. Popeil is also well known for his housewares inventions like his Giant Dehydrator and Beef Jerky Machine, his Electric Pasta Maker and his Showtime Rotisserie & BBQ. His Showtime Rotisserie & BBQ sold over eight million units in the US alone, helping Ronco's housewares sales exceed $1 billion in sales. After retiring, Popeil continued to invent products including the 5-in-1 Turkey Fryer & Food Cooking System which he had been developing for over ten years.

== Popular culture ==
Popeil's success in infomercials, memorable marketing personality, and ubiquity on American television have allowed him and his products to appear in a variety of popular media environments including cameo appearances on television shows such as The X-Files, (Note: In the episode "Beyond the Sea", Special Agent Dana Scully is shown sleeping with her television on while Ron Popeil touts the wonders of his Spray-On Hair (Great Looking Hair Formula #9) for only $39.92. The ad continues for a few seconds, displaying the product's fabulous abilities before shifting to show Scully awakening to the ghost of her recently deceased father.) Futurama, (Note: In the episode "A Big Piece of Garbage", Ron Popeil is said to be the inventor of a fictional technology which allows heads to be kept alive in jars indefinitely. Popeil appears in the episode as one of the talking heads. (Bratskeir, Kate (December 6, 2017). "8 Reasons You Shouldn't Underestimate The Greatness Of Ron Popeil: 8 Things You Never Knew About Ron Popeil, The Greatest Inventor Of All Time". Huffington Post.)) (Note: In the episode "The Luck of the Fryrish", Fry keeps his lucky seven-leaf clover in a "Ronco Record Vault".) King of the Hill, (Note: In the episode "Won't You Pimai Neighbor?", Dale Gribble states that if Bobby Hill incorrectly chooses from among the items possibly owned by the late Lama Sanglung, Bobby Hill will win a cap snaffler and that the cap snaffler, "Snaffles caps of any size jug, bottle or jar... and it really really works".) (Note: In the episode "The Perils of Polling", Dale Gribble asks if Hank got him a cap snaffler while Hank and Dale are being escorted to the polling place by the police.) The Simpsons, (Note: In the episode entitled "Radio Bart", Bart Simpson receives a "Superstar Celebrity Microphone" for his birthday. The toy and the TV advertisements for it were modeled after Ronco's "Mr. Microphone".) Sex and the City, (Note: Season 4 Episode 13 where the character Miranda is seen watching a Ron Popeil infomercial) The Daily Show, (Note: The famous line "Set it and forget it!", from the Showtime Rotisserie commercial, was used after showing the "catch phrase" discussions of the Senate debating the War in Iraq.) and The West Wing. (Note: Season 4 Episode 15 where President Bartlet is zapping through the TV program and sees a glimpse of Ron Popeil jumping on the stage in an informercial.) Parodies of Popeil's infomercials were done on the comedy show Saturday Night Live by Dan Aykroyd (Note: The "Veg-O-Matic" was parodied as the "Super Bass-O-Matic '76". This parody is mentioned in the Biography episode on Popeil.) and Eddie Murphy and the "Veg-O-Matic" may have provided comedian Gallagher inspiration for the "Sledge-O-Matic" routine since the 1980s. The animated series VeggieTales once featured a parody of the "Veg-O-Matic" dubbed as the "Forgive-O-Matic". (Note: VeggieTales: "God Wants Me to Forgive Them!?!". Released October 1994) "Additionally, the professional wrestling tag team The Midnight Express dubbed their finishing move the Veg-O-Matic.

Popeil was voted by Self magazine readers as one of the 25 people who have changed the way we eat, drink and think about food.

Popeil has been referenced in the music of Alice Cooper, the Beastie Boys, and "Weird Al" Yankovic. Yankovic's song "Mr. Popeil" was a tribute to his father, Samuel (and featured his half sister Lisa Popeil on backing vocals). Ron Popeil later used this song in some of his infomercials.

In the 2007 film Funny Games, one of the characters is channel surfing and briefly flicks past an infomercial for Ron Popeil's Vegetable Dehydrator. In the 1996 horror film Scream, the catchphrase is said ("But wait, there's more!"), itself in the tradition of a horror film's saying of a famous TV catchphrase, in the 1980s horror film The Shining's saying of "Here's Johnny!" (Carson) by announcer Ed McMahon.

In Malcolm Gladwell's book What the Dog Saw: And Other Adventures, Popeil is interviewed and many of his products, most notably the Veg-O-Matic and Showtime Rotisserie, are discussed. Gladwell's 2000 New Yorker piece "The Pitchman" about Popeil won Gladwell the 2001 National Magazine award.

== See also ==
- List of Ig Nobel Prize winners
