= Hooked on Classics =

Studio album by Royal Philharmonic Orchestra
- Released: 1981
- Studios: Olympic Sound Studios, London; Abbey Road Studios, London
- Genre: Classical disco
- Length: 47:39
- Labels: K-tel; RCA Records
- Producers: Jeff Jarratt; Don Reedman

Royal Philharmonic Orchestra chronology
Hooked on Classics (1981)	Hooked on Classics 2: Can't Stop the Classics (1982)

German/Austrian album cover

Hooked on Classics is a classical crossover album recorded by the Royal Philharmonic Orchestra conducted by Louis Clark, released in 1981 by K-tel and distributed by RCA Records, part of the Hooked on Classics series. It was produced by Jeff Jarratt and Don Reedman.

The opening track was called "Hooked On Classics (Parts 1 & 2)". A unique arrangement of this track, simply called "Hooked on Classics", was released as a single in July 1981, and was the version predominantly played by radio. It peaked at number 2 in the UK, number 10 in the US, and number 21 in Canada.

In Germany and Austria, the album was released titled "Classic Disco" and reached number one in both countries.

== Single ==
The opening track was called "Hooked on Classics (Parts 1 & 2)". A unique arrangement of this track, simply called "Hooked on Classics", was released as a single in July 1981, and was the version predominantly played by radio. With a listed time of 3'48", it contained the first five pieces of the album cut, skipping the next five (Beethoven's "Symphony No. 5, 1st Movement" through Rossini's "William Tell Overture"), followed by the remaining pieces. Though not listed as such on the single's label or in the Performance Rights Organization's database, it is implied this portion is "Part 1". The B-side of the single, also called "Hooked on Classics" and lasting 2:13, begins with the fifth piece from "Part 1" (Sibelius' "Karelia Suite, Intermezzo"), contains the missing five pieces found on the album cut, and concludes with the remaining pieces through "March of the Toreadors" which fades out, as opposed to the album cut and "Part 1"'s cold ending of the "1812 Overture". Presumably this is "Part 2". The label of the single incorrectly omits the "1812 Overture" from the list of pieces in the "Part 1" medley.

The single peaked at number 2 in the UK and later in the US at number 10 on the Billboard Hot 100 in February 1982. It was the 56th biggest hit of that year. The song also reached number 10 on the Cash Box Top 100. In Canada, it peaked at number 21, and spent four weeks at that position. "Hooked on Classics" also reached number one on the Canadian Adult Contemporary chart. "Hooked on Classics (Part 1 & 2)" was used in the soundtrack of American Made

== Chart performance "Hooked on Classics (Part 1)" ==
=== Weekly charts ===
Chart (1981–82)	Peak position
Australia (Kent Music Report)	9
Austria (Ö3 Austria Top 40)	1
Canada Top Singles	21
Canada Adult Contemporary	1
Germany (Official German Charts)	18
Irish (Irish Recorded Music Association)	7
New Zealand	6
South Africa (Springbok Radio)	9
UK Singles Chart	2
US Billboard Hot 100	10
US Cash Box Top 100	10
US Billboard Adult Contemporary	8

=== Year-end charts ===
Chart (1981)	Rank
Australia (Kent Music Report)	85
Canada	98
UK	26
US Cash Box	82

Chart (1982)	Rank
US Billboard Hot 100	56

== Grammy nominations ==
Year	Nominee / work	Award	Result
1981	"Hooked on Classics" (Single)	Best Pop Instrumental Performance	Nominated
1982	Hooked on Classics (Album)	Best Pop Instrumental Performance	Nominated

== Track listing ==
No.	Title	Length
1.	"Hooked on Classics (Parts 1 & 2)"	5:06
2.	"Hooked on Romance"	6:42
3.	"Hooked on Classics (Part 3)"	6:02
4.	"Hooked on Bach"	5:59
5.	"Hooked on Tchaikovsky"	5:29
6.	"Hooked on a Song"	5:11
7.	"Hooked on Mozart"	4:09
8.	"Hooked on Mendelssohn"	4:25
9.	"Hooked on a Can-Can"	4:56

=== Full track listing ===
1. Hooked on Classics (Parts 1 & 2) - 5:06
  - Piano Concerto No. 1 in B♭ Minor, Op. 23, I: Allegro non troppo e molto maestoso / Pyotr Ilyich Tchaikovsky
  - The Tale of Tsar Saltan: Flight of the Bumblebee / Nicolai Rimsky-Korsakov
  - Symphony No. 40 in G Minor, K. 550, I: Allegro molto / Wolfgang Amadeus Mozart
  - Rhapsody in Blue / George Gershwin
  - Karelia Suite, Op. 11, I: Intermezzo / Jean Sibelius
  - Symphony No. 5 in C Minor, Op. 67, I: Allegro con brio / Ludwig van Beethoven
  - Toccata and Fugue in D minor, BWV 565, Toccata / J.S. Bach
  - Serenade No. 13 in G Major, K. 525, "Eine Kleine Nachtmusik", I: Allegro / Wolfgang Amadeus Mozart
  - Symphony No. 9 in D Minor, Op. 125, IV: Presto- Allegro assai / Ludwig van Beethoven
  - William Tell Overture / Giacchino Rossini
  - The Marriage of Figaro, K. 492, Act 2: "Voi Che Sapete" / Wolfgang Amadeus Mozart
  - Romeo and Juliet Fantasy Overture / Pyotr Ilyich Tchaikovsky
  - Prince of Denmark's March / Jeremiah Clarke
  - Messiah, HWV 56, Part 2, No. 44: Hallelujah Chorus / George Frederic Handel
  - Piano Concerto in A Minor, Op. 16 I: Allegro molto moderato / Edvard Grieg
  - Carmen Suite No. 1, V: Les Toréadors / Georges Bizet
  - 1812 Overture, Op. 49 / Pyotr Ilyich Tchaikovsky
  - Serenade No. 13 in G Major, K. 525, “Eine Kleine Nachtmusik”, I: Allegro / Wolfgang Amadeus Mozart (briefly)
  - Symphony No. 9 in D Minor, Op. 125, IV: Presto- Allegro assai / Ludwig Van Beethoven (briefly)
2. Hooked on Romance - 6:42
  - Orchestral Suite No. 3 in D Major, BWV 1068, II: Air / J.S. Bach
  - Ave Maria, Op. 52, No. 6 / Franz Schubert
  - Liebesträume No. 3 in A♭ Major / Franz Liszt
  - Symphony No. 9 in D Minor, Op. 125, III: Adagio molto e cantabile / Beethoven
  - Rhapsody on a Theme of Paganini, Op. 43, Variation XVIII: Andante cantabile / Sergei Rachmaninov
  - Piano Sonata No. 14 in C♯ Minor, Op 27, No. 2 "Moonlight", I: Adagio sostenuto / Beethoven
  - Piano Sonata No. 8 in C Minor, Op. 13 "Pathetique", II: Adagio cantabile / Beethoven
  - Clarinet Concerto in A Major, K. 622, II: Adagio / Mozart
  - Xerxes "Ombra mai fu" (Largo) / Handel
3. Hooked On Classics (Part 3) - 6:02
  - A Midsummer Night's Dream, Op. 61, IX: Wedding March / Felix Mendelssohn
  - Radetzky March, Op. 228 / Johann Strauss I
  - Symphony for Organ No. 5, V: Toccata / Charles Marie Widor
  - Water Music Suite No. 2 in D Major, Alla Hornpipe / Handel
  - Humoresque No. 7 in G♭ Major, Op. 101 / Antonin Dvořák
  - Wiegenlied, Op. 49, No. 4 (Lullaby) / Johannes Brahms
  - Solomon, HWV 67, Act 3: The Arrival of the Queen of Sheba / Handel
  - Pictures at an Exhibition, I: Promenade / Modest Mussorgsky
  - Peer Gynt Suite No. 1, Op. 23a, IV: In the Hall of the Mountain King / Grieg
  - Caprice No. 24 in A Minor / Niccolo Paganini
  - Die Walküre, Act 3, No. 1: Ride of the Valkyries / Richard Wagner
  - The Hebrides / Mendelssohn
  - Military March No. 1 in D Major, Op. 51 / Schubert
  - Polonaise in A Major, Op. 40, No. 1 / Frederic Chopin
  - Symphony No. 4 in A Major, Op. 90, "Italian" I: Allegro vivace / Mendelssohn
  - Light Cavalry Overture / Franz von Suppé
  - L'Arlésienne Suite No. 2, IV: Farandole / Bizet
  - Symphony No. 9 in E Minor, Op. 95, "From the New World", II: Largo / Dvořák
  - Lohengrin, Prelude to Act 3 / Wagner
4. Hooked On Bach - 5:59 (All music composed by Johann Sebastian Bach)
  - Ave Maria, "Méditation sur le Premier Prélude de Piano de J. S. Bach" / Charles Gounod
  - Minuet in G Major, BWV Anh. 114
  - Orchestral Suite No. 2 in B Minor, BWV 1067, VII: Badinerie
  - Brandenburg Concerto No. 3 in G Major, BWV 1048, I
  - Brandenburg Concerto No. 2 in F Major, BWV 1047, I
  - St. Matthew Passion, BWV 244, Stanza 5, No. 15: Erkenne mich, mein Hüter
  - Orchestral Suite No. 2 in B Minor, BWV 1067, IV: Bourrée (No. 2)
  - Orchestral Suite No. 2 in B Minor, BWV 1067, IV: Bourrée (No. 1)
  - Orchestral Suite No. 3 in D Major, BWV 1068, III: Gavotte
  - Musette in D Major, BWV Anh. 126
  - March in D Major, BWV Anh. 122
  - French Suite No. 5 in G Major, BWV 816, IV: Gavotte
  - Wachet auf, ruft uns die Stimme, BWV 140
  - Ave Maria
5. Hooked on Tchaikovsky - 5:29 (All music composed by Pyotr Illyich Tchaikovsky)
  - Capriccio Italien, Op. 45
  - Swan Lake Suite, Op. 20a, I: Scene
  - The Nutcracker Suite, Op. 71a, VII: Dance of the Reed Flutes
  - Romeo & Juliet Fantasy Overture
  - Symphony No. 6 in B Minor, Op. 74 "Pathetique", I: Adagio
  - The Nutcracker Suite, Op. 71a, IV: Trepak (Russian Dance)
  - The Nutcracker Suite, Op. 71a, III: Dance of the Sugar Plum Fairy
  - The Nutcracker Suite, Op. 71a, II: March
  - The Nutcracker Suite, Op. 71a, VI: Chinese Dance
  - The Nutcracker Suite, Op. 71a, I: Miniature Overture
  - Piano Concerto No. 1 in B♭ Minor, Op. 23, I: Allegro non troppo e molto maestoso
  - Capriccio Italien
6. Hooked on a Song - 5:11
  - Carmen, Act 2, "Votre toast, je peux vous le rendre" (Toreador Song) / Bizet
  - Funiculì, Funiculà / Luigi Denza
  - Tarantella Napoletana / Rossini
  - Prince Igor, Act 2, Polovtsian Dances / Alexander Borodin
  - La Gioconda, Act 3, Dance of the Hours / Amilcare Ponchielli
  - Carmen, Act 1, No. 5, "L'amour est un oiseau rebelle" (Habanera) / Bizet
  - Neapolitan Serenade (O sole mio) / Eduardo di Capua
  - Madama Butterfly, Act 2, No. 2, "Un bel dì vedremo" / Giacomo Puccini
  - Il Trovatore, Act 2, No. 1, "Vedi! Le Fosche Notturne Spogli" (Anvil Chorus) / Giuseppe Verdi
  - Votre Toast (Reprise) / Bizet
7. Hooked On Mozart - 4:09 (All music composed by Wolfgang Amadeus Mozart)
  - Piano Sonata No. 11 in A Major, K.331, III: Rondo (Alla Turca)
  - Piano Sonata No. 16 in C Major, K. 545, I: Allegro
  - Serenade No. 13 in G Major, K. 525, "Eine Kleine Nachtmusik", II: Andante (Romanza)
  - Piano Concerto No. 21 in C Major, K. 467, II: Andante
  - Piano Sonata No. 16 in C Major, K. 545, I: Allegro
  - Divertimento in F Major, "Ein musikalischer Spaß" A Musical Joke K. 522, IV: Presto
  - The Marriage of Figaro, K. 492, Act 1, No. 20, "Non più andrai"
  - The Marriage of Figaro, K. 492, Overture
  - Serenade No. 13 in G Major, K. 525, "Eine Kleine Nachtmusik", IV: Allegro
  - The Magic Flute, K. 620, Overture
  - Horn Concerto No. 4 in E♭ Major, K. 495, III: Rondo: Allegro Vivace
  - Piano Sonata No. 11 in A Major, K.331, III: Rondo (Alla Turca) (briefly)
  - Symphony No. 41 in C Major, K. 551 "Jupiter", I: Allegro vivace (briefly)
8. Hooked on Mendelssohn 4:25
  - Violin Concerto in E Minor, Op. 64, III: Allegro molto vivace
  - Octet in E♭ Major, Op. 20, III: Scherzo
  - Violin Concerto in E Minor, Op. 64, III: Allegro molto vivace
9. Hooked on a Can-Can - 4:56
  - Orpheus in the Underworld, Infernal Galop (Can-Can) / Jacques Offenbach
  - Unter Donner und Blitz (Thunder and Lightning) Polka, Op. 324 / Johann Strauss II
  - Hungarian Dance No. 5 in G Minor / Brahms
  - Tritsch Tratsch Polka, Op. 214 / Johann Strauss II
  - La Vie Parisienne/ Offenbach
  - La Gioconda, Act 3, Dance of the Hours / Ponchielli
  - Csárdás / Vittorio Monti
  - La Vie Parisienne, Act 1, "À Paris, nous arrivons en masse" / Offenbach
  - Poet and Peasant Overture / Suppé
  - Can-Can (Reprise) / Offenbach
