= Ronco =

American purveyor of kitchen gadgets

HD Schulman International Trading LLC
- Trade name: Ronco
- Industry: Small appliances
- Founded: 1964; 62 years ago
- Founder: Ron Popeil
- Headquarters: Chicago, Illinois, United States
- Area served: Worldwide
- Products: Stainless steel Rotisserie, Veg-O-Matic, Kitchen Knives
- Website: www.ronco.com

HD Schulman International Trading LLC, doing business as Ronco, is an American company that manufactures and sells kitchen appliances. Ron Popeil founded the company in 1964, and infomercials for the company's products quickly made Ronco a household name. Popeil became known as the “father of the infomercial” and helped to establish the phrase, “Set it and forget it!” in reference to Ronco’s signature product: the rotisserie oven. The names "Ronco" and "Popeil" and the suffix "-O-Matic" (used in many early product names) became icons of American popular culture and were often referred to by comedians introducing fictional gadgets and As-Seen-On-TV parodies.

== History ==
Ron Popeil was inspired to start the company by the open-market hustling he saw on Maxwell Street in Chicago during his youth. In the beginning, the company chiefly sold inventions developed by Popeil's father, Samuel "S.J." Popeil. Products include the Veg-O-Matic and the Popeil Pocket Fisherman, a product manufactured by S.J. Popeil's company. During the 1970s, Ron Popeil began developing products on his own to sell through Ronco.

In August 2005, Popeil announced his sale of the company to Fi-Tek VII, a Denver holding company, for $55 million. He was expected to continue working with the company as spokesman and product developer, but sold the company in order to have more time with his family. Fi-Tek VII changed its name to Ronco, and maintained the right of first refusal for Popeil's future inventions. He continued to develop and market inventions through a successor company, Ron's Enterprises.

Popeil Inventions, Inc. attempted to acquire the trademark on the phrase "set it and forget it," used in the commercials for the Showtime Rotisserie Grill (and "Household goods, namely, rotisseries, electric food dehydrators and structural parts therefor, namely, dehydrator trays and screens") on May 5, 2005, but had abandoned the application by June 5, 2006. The phrase has gone on to be used in popular culture, and has also been used as a trademark in the sale of many other goods.

On June 14, 2007, Ronco filed Chapter 11 in U.S. bankruptcy court. Paperwork filed showed that Ronco creditors, the largest of which was Popeil himself, were owed US$32.7 million.

In 2011, CD3 Holdings, Inc., a consumer products company, acquired Ronco.

On April 27, 2018, Ronco filed for Chapter 11 bankruptcy, seeking time to reorganize after failing to secure funding.

On June 13, 2018, Ronco changed its bankruptcy filing from Chapter 11 (reorganization) to Chapter 7, full liquidation and shutdown.

As of 2022, HD Schulman International Trading, LLC had purchased the rights to the Ronco brand and its portfolio of products, and markets them through the ronco.com website.

== Inventions ==
Ronco is known for a wide range of products marketed and in some cases invented by Ron Popeil. Among them are:

- Showtime Rotisserie: The Ronco collection of rotisserie ovens can be used to cook chickens, barbecue ribs, lamb racks, seafood, and roasted vegetables. "Set it, and forget it!"
- Electric Food Dehydrator: Make apple chips, dried bananas, turkey jerky, beef jerky and more.
- Popeil Pocket Fisherman: A handheld folding fishing rod and reel preloaded with fishing line.
- Solid Flavor Injector: Used to inject solid ingredients into meat or other foods. A similar product, called the Liquid Flavor Injector, allowed for the injecting of liquid ingredients into meat; e.g., lime juice into chicken. This product accompanied the Showtime Rotisserie.
- Chop-O-Matic: a hand food processor."
- Dial-O-Matic: successor to the Veg-O-Matic (and very similar to a mandolin slicer). "
- Inside-The-Shell Egg Scrambler.
- Six Star 20-Piece Cutlery Set.
- GLH-9 (Great Looking Hair Formula #9): hair in a spray can.
- Drain Buster.
- Smokeless Ashtray: a device which used an integrated fan to draw smoke away from the materials in the ashtray.
- Ronco Popeil Automatic Pasta Maker.
- Ronco Rhinestone Stud Setter: "It changes everyday clothing into exciting fashions and you don't have to spend a fortune."
- The Cap Snaffler: bottle opener.

== Awards ==
- The Ronco Inside-The-Shell Electric Egg Scrambler, from 1978, won 84th place in Mobile Magazine's Top 100 Gadgets of All Time.
- Consumers Digest Award "Best Buy in Rotisserie" Dec. 2010.

== Records ==
Ronco, like its rival K-tel, was also a record label, issuing compilation albums created for TV advertising and licensed from major record labels. In the United Kingdom, its first album was 20 Star Tracks, released in 1972. It issued three albums that reached No. 1 on the U.K. album charts: the That'll Be the Day soundtrack in 1973, which was removed from the U.K. charts after six consecutive weeks at No. 1, as TV-advertised compilations were banned from the chart; Disco Daze and Disco Nites in 1981; and Raiders of the Pop Charts, released at the end of 1982, topping the chart in 1983. Its then-novel marketing techniques made it a major force, until the emergence of the Now That's What I Call Music! albums and their imitators, after which Ronco rapidly disappeared from the U.K. album market in 1984, when its parent company went bankrupt. Many of its U.K. ads in the 1970s and 1980s, whether for its kitchen products or albums, featured the voice of Tommy Vance.

== See also ==
- Food dehydrator
- K-tel
