= Let's Dance (radio) =

Radio music program

Advertisement for Let's Dance

Let's Dance is a Saturday night radio music program that was broadcast by NBC in the mid-1930s.

Sponsored by the National Biscuit Company (initially to promote their new Ritz Crackers), it aired for three full hours in any given Time zone, starting at 10:30pm on the East Coast. This late-night time slot gave the program a much larger audience on the West Coast when heard earlier in the evening. Let's Dance was a five-hour broadcast from New York, yet calculated so that all time zones heard three hours of music. The first three hours of the broadcast were played between 10:30pm to 1:30am in The East Coast Time zone, and 9:30pm to 12:30am in the Central Time zone. Between 9:30pm and 12:30am in the Mountain Time zone, listeners tuned in to the second, third and fourth hours. Hours three, four and five were heard on the West Coast between the hours of 9:30pm and 12:30am.

The series premiered December 1, 1934, showcasing three different regular bands. The mellow music of Kel Murray (a pseudonym for Murray Kellner) and the Latin rhythms of Xavier Cugat made Benny Goodman's group stand out as "downright thrilling," according to George Simon. It was a turning point for Goodman, who had more than 70 Fletcher Henderson swing arrangements by the time Let's Dance went off the air May 25, 1935. Despite its popularity, the program abruptly ended due to a labor dispute involving Nabisco employees, with the company temporarily discontinuing all of their sponsored radio shows as a result. However, because of the expense involved in sustaining Let's Dance, Nabisco decided not to renew the series for another season.

George Spink, writing in the Chicago Sun-Times, described the crucial role of Let's Dance in launching Goodman as the "King of Swing":

Willard Alexander, who died in 1984, was the band's booking agent in 1935. He had placed his job on the line at the Music Corporation of America (MCA) by representing Goodman. In 1978, Alexander spent an afternoon with me at his New York office recalling the problems Goodman faced during the summer of 1935... In early 1935, Goodman and his struggling band had been one of three orchestras featured on NBC’s Saturday night Let’s Dance radio program. Xavier Cugat’s Latin orchestra and Kel Murray’s society orchestra dominated the first two "live" hours; Goodman was not heard until the last hour, late in the evening on the East Coast.

Other big bands such as Guy Lombardo’s and Glen Gray’s already enjoyed nationwide popularity. But they were patterned after the so-called hotel bands and played a pleasant, innocuous, "sweet style" of music... Between the end of the Let's Dance series in May 1935 and the band’s opening at the Congress, Benny Goodman and his orchestra suffered one defeat after another. In August, however, they scored a triumph at the Palomar in Los Angeles, a prelude of what was to happen at the Congress... The discouraged Goodman band opened August 21 for a three-week stay at the Palomar on Vermont and Third in Hollywood. Goodman started the evening cautiously, playing some stock arrangements he had purchased on the trip. The Palomar crowd seemed as indifferent to the band as the other audiences had been that summer. According to Alexander, Goodman's drummer, Gene Krupa, said, "If we're gonna die, Benny, let's die playing our own thing." At the beginning of the next set, Goodman told the band to put aside the stock arrangements and called for charts by Fletcher Henderson and other "swing" arrangers who were writing for the band. When the band’s trumpeter, Bunny Berigan, played his solos on Henderson’s versions of "Sometimes I'm Happy" and "King Porter Stomp," the Palomar dancers cheered like crazy and exploded with applause! They even gathered around the bandstand to listen to this new music.

Radio had made the difference. Earlier that year, the crowd at the Palomar had heard Goodman’s band on the Let's Dance program. The coastal time difference enabled West Coast listeners to hear Goodman beginning at 9pm, three hours earlier than listeners on the East Coast heard the show. And a West Coast disc jockey, Al Jarvis, had been playing Goodman’s recordings on his shows. The Palomar audience had been groomed for Benny Goodman and His Orchestra. Radio broadcasts from the Palomar sent the excitement from coast to coast--including Goodman's hometown, Chicago.
