= K-tel =

Canadian international budget record label

K-Tel International
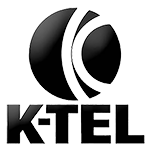
- Type: Private
- Industry: phonographic industry
- Founded: 1962; 64 years ago
- Founder: Philip Kives
- Headquarters: Winnipeg, Manitoba, Canada
- Products: Television advertising, music
- Owner: Philip Kives
- Website: k-tel.com

K-tel International Ltd is a Canadian company which formerly specialized in selling consumer products through infomercials and live demonstration. Its products include compilation music albums, including The Super Hits series, The Dynamic Hits series and The Number One Hits series and consumer products, including the Record Selector, the Veg-O-Matic, the Miracle Brush, and the Feather Touch Knife. The company has sold more than half a billion units worldwide.

K-tel is based in Winnipeg, Manitoba, Canada, and has been in business since the late 1960s. It has subsidiaries or other controlled entities in the US and UK.

== History ==
K-tel was founded by Philip Kives, a demonstration salesman from Oungre, Saskatchewan. Kives had worked at a number of jobs as a young man, including selling cookware door-to-door and in a department store, and as a pitch-man on the Boardwalk in Atlantic City.

In 1962 he used his own money and his fast-talking demonstration style to create a new kind of television advertisement in Canada. His first product was a Teflon-coated frying pan. He made a deal with the Eaton's department store to carry the product and with a local television station to air the commercials on a per-inquiry basis with a guaranteed minimum.

Kives bought and marketed a number of products from Samuel Popeil, father of Ronco founder Ron Popeil, including the Dial-O-Matic and Veg-O-Matic food slicers and the Feather Touch Knife. In August 1965, he began selling the Feather Touch Knife in Australia and by Christmas had sold one million knives. Kives later began sourcing his own products, including the Miracle Brush, which sold 28 million units.

K-tel was formally incorporated in 1968, with Kives as CEO. The company operated profitably during the 1970s and expanded both through acquisitions in its core area of business and diversification into other areas. Kives' cousin Raymond worked as president of the K-tel US division from 1967 to 1977, and the K-tel Europe division from 1977 to 1984.

In the five years prior to 1981, K-tel sold more than $150 million of LPs in 34 countries. Its sales increased from $23 million in 1971 to $178 million in 1981. The company diversified, forming subsidiaries in areas such as real estate and oil exploration and also acquired rival Candlelite Records in 1980. K-tel lost $15.9 million when Candlelite's customers refused to pay for their shipments.

The failure of this and several other high-risk ventures forced the publicly traded US entity, K-tel International, to file for Chapter 11 bankruptcy protection in 1984. In 1986, the Bank of Montreal foreclosed on the K-tel Canadian subsidiary at the same time as the US Chapter 11 filing. Advised by Minneapolis-based Sullivan Associates, K-tel negotiated settlements with banks and other preferred and unsecured creditors. Six years later, after all the legal battles, a settlement was reached with the Bank of Montreal, and in 1991, Kives got his Canadian company back.

In 1993, K-tel earned a $2.7 million profit on sales of $56 million, and in 1994, ranked #7 on BusinessWeek's annual Hot Growth List. Mickey Elfenbein, Kives' nephew, was appointed CEO of the K-tel International division in 1993 and served until the late 1990s. Elfenbein's son, Mark, produced the company's highest selling music products of the 1990s with the creation of the "Club Mix" series which reached RIAA gold and platinum sales success. K-tel increased its worldwide sales, primarily of music-related products, and had a successful NASDAQ IPO trading under the symbol KTEL.

=== Dot-com bubble ===
In mid-April 1998, during the dot-com bubble, news that the company was expanding its business to the Internet sent the thinly traded stock shooting from about $3 to over $7 in one day (3:1 split adjusted). The short interest of the stock swelled. The price of the stock peaked at about $34 in early May, and began to decline, reaching $12 in November and eventually pennies. The sudden upswing was fuelled mainly by a large short squeeze. Traders with short positions either "bought in" or were forced to cover positions at very high prices because of the great losses.

In 2007, Philip Kives took K-tel private again. The company completed a 1-for-5000 reverse split on July 18, 2007, reducing the number of public shareholders to under 300 and allowing the company to delist. It changed its symbol to KTLI and moved from the NASDAQ to the over-the-counter market.

=== Recent years ===
The company now earns profits from its catalogue of Billboard-charting hits, by the original artists, particularly songs from the 1950s through the 1980s. Tracks include "The Twist" by Chubby Checker, "What I Like About You" by the Romantics, "Tutti Frutti" by Little Richard, "Surfin’ Bird" by the Trashmen, and "Help Me Make It Through the Night" by Sammi Smith.

K-tel distributes 200,000 songs worldwide per year on digital platforms, including Amazon, Spotify and iTunes, and licenses songs from its catalogue for use in commercials (e.g., Nike, Fiat, Coke and KFC), films (e.g., Spider-Man, Baby Driver, The Dallas Buyers Club and Hotel Transylvania 2) and television programs (e.g., Stranger Things, Ray Donovan, Breaking Bad, Californication, Mad Men and Transparent).

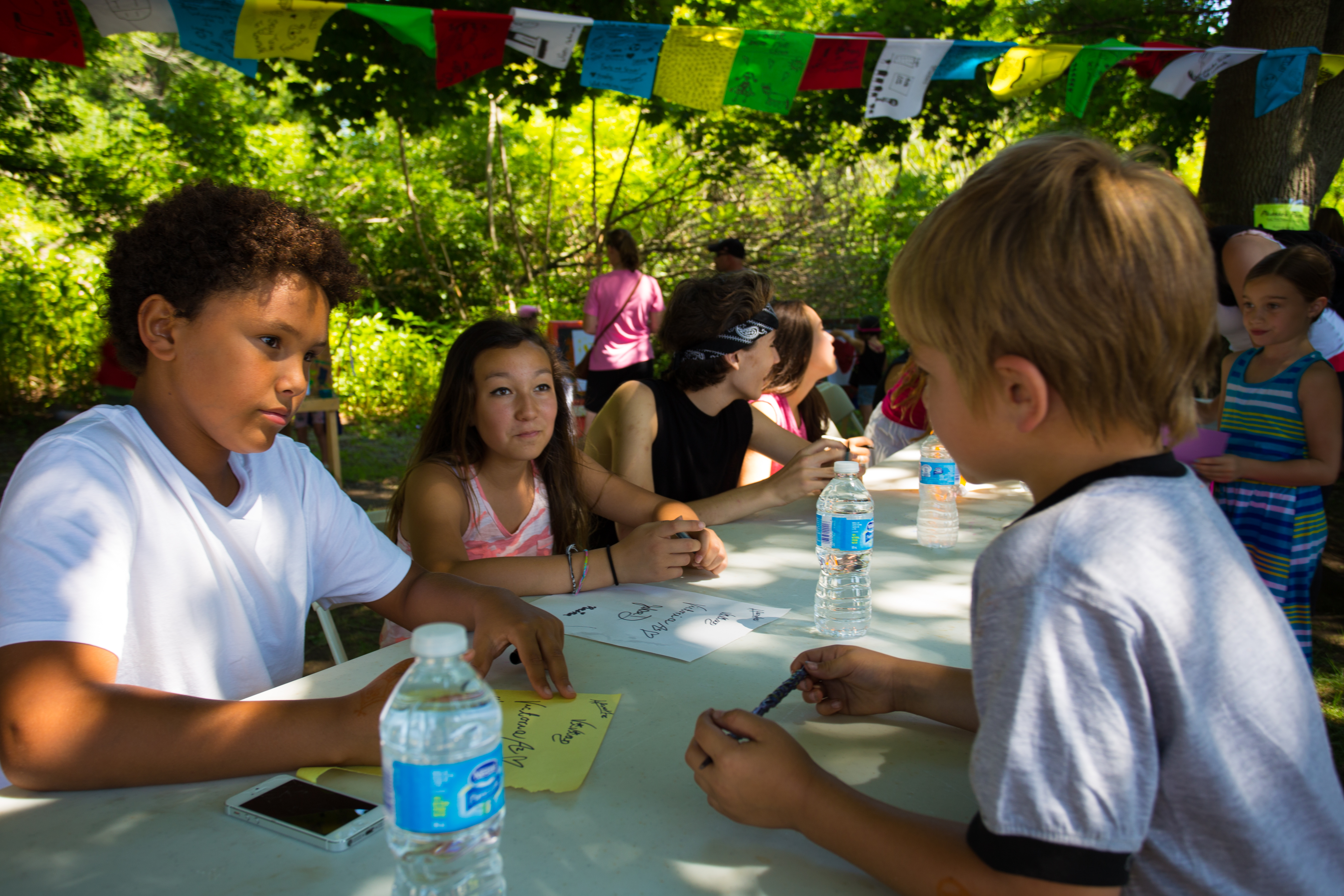
Mini Pop Kids autograph signing event in 2015

K-tel Records has also produced a Canadian children’s music group called Mini Pop Kids, a series of recordings in which a group of Canadian children aged 10 to 14 sing family-friendly pop hits. The series sold millions of copies when it was originally distributed in the 1980s. K-tel brought the series back in Canada, the United States, and Israel as of May 15, 2004, and has continued to produce recordings. The latest album, Mini Pop Kids 18, was released in 2020 in Canada. The series is promoted by a touring group that performs shows across Canada.

K-tel’s company founder Phillip Kives died in Winnipeg, Manitoba, Canada, on April 27, 2016.

== Music business ==
In 1966, Philip Kives released the company's first compilation album, a collection of 25 country songs titled 25 Country Hits. Every copy was sold. The idea of compilation albums was new, and the venture's unexpected success led to further releases. K-tel's second release, 25 Polka Greats, sold 1.5 million copies in the United States

K-tel recruited Australian Don Reedman (twin brother of Peter Reedman, who was already working in the Australian office) to set up the UK-based division of K-tel Records in the early 1970s.

The company built the business of releasing compilation albums that combined material from a number of popular artists onto a single theme album using the tag line "20 Original Hits! 20 Original Stars!". The company negotiated directly with artists and labels for the rights to reproduce their original recordings, in the process also securing a long-term asset through adding those recordings to their catalogue. K-tel’s marketing of such albums was most noted for its television advertisements which were described by Andrew H. Malcolm of The New York Times as "blunt, grainy and loud" and featured Winnipeg radio disc jockey Bob Washington who had an "urgent, driving voice" and was "obviously assigned to squeeze four minutes of copy into a one-minute ad."

While most of the compilation albums relied on the pop charts of the day, there were some that focused on hits from a specific genre. Examples include:

- 20 Power Hits (1973) and Gold Rock (1975), mainly rock-oriented.
- Super Bad, Super Bad Is Back (both 1973), and Souled Out (1975), soul and R&B hits of the day.
- 20 Town & Country Greats (1974), a mixture of mainly country songs from the late 1950s to early 1970s.
- Summer Cruisin' (1976) and Rock 'N' Roll Show (1977), mostly 1950s music.
- Goofy Greats (1975) and Looney Tunes (1976) compiled novelty songs from the 1950s and 1960s.
- Night Moves (1979), a two-record disco dance tutorial with accompanying instruction book featuring Deney Terrio; included one side of disco songs featured in the lessons.
- Modern Dance (1981) compiled songs of the burgeoining synth-pop movement.

The company also created original records, including the Grammy-nominated Hooked on Classics series of classical recordings with the Royal Philharmonic Orchestra.

From 1983 to 1986, K-tel distributed original records for the popular youth-oriented television series Kids Incorporated, featuring two self-titled LP's (1983 Pilot, 1984), The Chart Hits (1985) and New Attitude (1986).

== Answering machine recordings ==
In the late 1980s, K-tel International (UK) Ltd. released several novelty cassette tapes by The Comic Answer Company Ltd. Each tape contained several short audio clips which were intended to be played back aloud and re-recorded onto an answering machine. A five-second countdown preceded each message to help customers begin recording at the right moment, and a formal answering machine message in a neutral voice was included at the end of each tape in case they wanted to revert the novelty message.

These recordings included at least five spoken word tapes released in 1988, and made in partnership with ITV Central's popular satirical puppet show Spitting Image. Show regulars including Chris Barrie, Steve Nallon and Nigel Plaskitt participated as voice actors. Examples and the impersonations therein include:

- Political Answerbacks (OCE 5501): Neil Kinnock, Roy Hattersley, Ronald Reagan, Margaret Thatcher
- More Political Answerbacks (OCE 5502): Margaret Thatcher, Neil Kinnock, John Cole
- Royal Answerbacks (OCE 5503): The Queen Mother, Prince Charles, Prince Andrew
- Celebrity Answerbacks (OCE 5504): David Attenborough, David Coleman, Bob Geldof, Robert Runcie
- More Celebrity Answerbacks (OCE 5505): Barry Norman, Robin Day, John Gielgud, Sean Connery

== Other ventures ==
In 1970 the company briefly began distributing foreign films in the United States, beginning with Mr. Superinvisible. They produced their own Pardon My Blooper film, based on one of their records.

In the early 1980s, K-tel dabbled in the video game business under the brands K-tel Software, K-tek Software, K-tel International (UK) Ltd. and Xonox. Although K-tel's other divisions left this market after the crash of 1983, K-tel UK continued to release several games into 1984.

== Legacy ==
K-tel helped define the way people purchased music in the 1960s and 1970s. In 2013, Forbes wrote a piece on K-tel, titled "K-Tel Records: The Spotify of the 70s", pointing out that the way people discovered new music in the 70s was through K-tel compilations, in the same way that Spotify playlists are now used to find related artists.

In 2013, Dave Grohl, the front man of Foo Fighters, gave a keynote speech at SXSW, praising K-tel for exposing him to music early in his life, specifically "Frankenstein" by the Edgar Winter Group: "Grohl told the crowd earnestly that the song's inclusion on a 1975 K-tel Records Blockbuster compilation – the first album that he ever owned – was 'the record that changed my life.'"

K-tel infomercials were spoofed on television, such as on an episode of The Simpsons cartoon series, where the fictional B-movie actor Troy McClure promotes widgets on a show called I Can’t Believe They Invented It!.

== See also ==
- Arcade Records
- List of record labels
- Ronco
