= List of UK top-ten albums in 1985 =

The UK Albums Chart is one of many music charts compiled by the Official Charts Company that calculates the best-selling albums of the week in the United Kingdom. Before 2004, the chart was only based on the sales of physical albums. This list shows albums that peaked in the Top 10 of the UK Albums Chart during 1985, as well as albums which peaked in 1984 and 1986 but were in the top 10 in 1985. The entry date is when the album appeared in the top ten for the first time (week ending, as published by the Official Charts Company, which is six days after the chart is announced).

The first new number-one album of the year was Alf by Alison Moyet. Overall, twenty different albums peaked at number-one in 1985.

== Top-ten albums ==
Key

| Symbol | Meaning |
|---|---|
| ‡ | Album peaked in 1984 but still in chart in 1985. |
| ♦ | Album released in 1985 but peaked in 1986. |
| Entered | The date that the album first appeared in the chart. |
| Peak | Highest position that the album reached in the UK Albums Chart. |

| Entered (week ending) | Weeks in top 10 | Single | Artist | Peak | Peak reached (week ending) | Weeks at peak |
Albums in 1984
| 16 June 1984 | 35 | Born in the U.S.A. | Bruce Springsteen | 1 | 16 February 1985 | 5 |
| 21 July 1984 | 17 | Private Dancer ‡ | Tina Turner | 2 | 1 September 1984 | 2 |
| 28 July 1984 | 30 | Diamond Life ‡ | Sade | 2 | 28 July 1984 | 5 |
| 15 September 1984 | 22 | Eliminator | ZZ Top | 3 | 26 January 1985 | 1 |
| 15 September 1984 | 6 | Purple Rain | Prince and The Revolution | 7 | 16 March 1985 | 1 |
| 13 October 1984 | 8 | The Unforgettable Fire ‡ | U2 | 1 | 13 October 1984 | 2 |
| 20 October 1984 | 9 | The Age of Consent ‡ | Bronski Beat | 4 | 20 October 1984 | 2 |
| 10 November 1984 | 14 | Welcome to the Pleasuredome ‡ | Frankie Goes to Hollywood | 1 | 10 November 1984 | 1 |
| 10 November 1984 | 13 | The Collection ‡ | Ultravox | 2 | 10 November 1984 | 3 |
| 17 November 1984 | 16 | Make It Big ‡ | Wham! | 1 | 17 November 1984 | 2 |
| 17 November 1984 | 25 | Alf | Alison Moyet | 1 | 19 January 1985 | 1 |
| 24 November 1984 | 6 | Arena ‡ | Duran Duran | 6 | 24 November 1984 | 1 |
| 24 November 1984 | 7 | Greatest Hits ‡ | Shakin' Stevens | 8 | 8 December 1984 | 4 |
| 1 December 1984 | 9 | The Hits Album ‡ | Various artists | 1 | 1 December 1984 | 7 |
| 8 December 1984 | 8 | Now That's What I Call Music! 4 ‡ | Various artists | 2 | 8 December 1984 | 6 |
| 15 December 1984 | 5 | Party Party – 16 Great Party Icebreakers ‡ | Black Lace | 4 | 22 December 1984 | 2 |
Albums in 1985
| 19 January 1985 | 6 | Agent Provocateur | Foreigner | 1 | 26 January 1985 | 3 |
| 26 January 1985 | 10 | Hits Out of Hell | Meat Loaf | 2 | 9 February 1985 | 1 |
| 2 February 1985 | 3 | The Very Best of Chris de Burgh | Chris de Burgh | 6 | 2 February 1985 | 1 |
| 2 February 1985 | 4 | The Barbara Dickson Songbook | Barbara Dickson | 5 | 2 February 1985 | 2 |
| 9 February 1985 | 1 | 20/20 | George Benson | 9 | 9 February 1985 | 1 |
| 16 February 1985 | 2 | Steps in Time | King | 6 | 12 February 1985 | 1 |
| 23 February 1985 | 3 | Meat Is Murder | The Smiths | 1 | 23 February 1985 | 1 |
| 2 March 1985 | 36 | No Jacket Required | Phil Collins | 1 | 2 March 1985 | 5 |
| 2 March 1985 | 3 | Reckless | Bryan Adams | 7 | 2 March 1985 | 2 |
| 2 March 1985 | 1 | Chess | Various artists | 10 | 2 March 1985 | 1 |
| 9 March 1985 | 30 | Songs from the Big Chair | Tears for Fears | 2 | 9 March 1985 | 3 |
| 16 March 1985 | 1 | She's the Boss | Mick Jagger | 6 | 16 March 1985 | 1 |
| 16 March 1985 | 30 | Like a Virgin | Madonna | 1 | 21 September 1985 | 2 |
| 23 March 1985 | 7 | Dream into Action | Howard Jones | 2 | 23 March 1985 | 2 |
| 23 March 1985 | 1 | Behind the Sun | Eric Clapton | 8 | 23 March 1985 | 1 |
| 30 March 1985 | 5 | Andrew Lloyd Webber's Requiem | Placido Domingo, Sarah Brightman, Paul Miles-Kingston and Lorin Maazel | 4 | 6 April 1985 | 1 |
| 6 April 1985 | 10 | The Secret of Association | Paul Young | 1 | 6 April 1985 | 1 |
| 13 April 1985 | 10 | Hits 2 | Various artists | 1 | 13 April 1985 | 6 |
| 13 April 1985 | 10 | Bangs & Crashes ♦ | Go West | 8 | 8 March 1986 | 2 |
| 27 April 1985 | 1 | Love Not Money | Everything but the Girl | 10 | 27 April 1985 | 1 |
| 4 May 1985 | 2 | Around the World in a Day | Prince and The Revolution | 5 | 4 May 1985 | 1 |
| 4 May 1985 | 3 | Voices from the Holy Land | BBC Welsh Chorus conducted by John Hugh Thomas with Aled Jones | 6 | 20 July 1985 | 1 |
| 11 May 1985 | 21 | Be Yourself Tonight | Eurythmics | 3 | 18 May 1985 | 5 |
| 11 May 1985 | 2 | Mr. Bad Guy | Freddie Mercury | 6 | 11 May 1985 | 2 |
| 11 May 1985 | 2 | Flaunt the Imperfection | China Crisis | 9 | 11 May 1985 | 1 |
| 18 May 1985 | 1 | The Man – The Best of Elvis Costello | Elvis Costello | 8 | 18 May 1985 | 1 |
| 18 May 1985 | 6 | Best of the 20th Century Boy | Marc Bolan and T. Rex | 5 | 1 June 1985 | 2 |
| 25 May 1985 | 65 | Brothers in Arms | Dire Straits | 1 | 25 May 1985 | 14 |
| 25 May 1985 | 8 | Out Now! | Various artists | 2 | 25 May 1985 | 4 |
| 25 May 1985 | 1 | Low-Life | New Order | 7 | 25 May 1985 | 1 |
| 25 May 1985 | 1 | Youthquake | Dead or Alive | 9 | 25 May 1985 | 1 |
| 1 June 1985 | 4 | Now Dance: The 12" Mixes | Various artists | 3 | 1 June 1985 | 2 |
| 1 June 1985 | 1 | The Best of Eagles | Eagles | 10 | 1 June 1985 | 1 |
| 8 June 1985 | 3 | Our Favourite Shop | The Style Council | 1 | 8 June 1985 | 1 |
| 15 June 1985 | 8 | Boys and Girls | Bryan Ferry | 1 | 15 June 1985 | 2 |
| 22 June 1985 | 4 | Cupid & Psyche 85 | Scritti Politti | 5 | 22 June 1985 | 2 |
| 29 June 1985 | 9 | Misplaced Childhood | Marillion | 1 | 29 June 1985 | 1 |
| 29 June 1985 | 9 | The Dream of the Blue Turtles | Sting | 3 | 29 June 1985 | 1 |
| 29 June 1985 | 7 | All Through the Night | Aled Jones with the BBC Welsh Symphony Orchestra and Chorus | 2 | 20 July 1985 | 1 |
| 29 June 1985 | 2 | Little Creatures | Talking Heads | 10 | 29 June 1985 | 2 |
| 6 July 1985 | 1 | Suddenly | Billy Ocean | 9 | 6 July 1985 | 1 |
| 13 July 1985 | 2 | Fly on the Wall | AC/DC | 7 | 13 July 1985 | 1 |
| 20 July 1985 | 4 | Greatest Hits – Volume I & Volume II | Billy Joel | 7 | 20 July 1985 | 1 |
| 27 July 1985 | 11 | The Kenny Rogers Story | Kenny Rogers | 4 | 14 September 1985 | 2 |
| 17 August 1985 | 10 | Now That's What I Call Music! 5 | Various artists | 1 | 17 August 1985 | 5 |
| 17 August 1985 | 10 | Madonna | Madonna | 6 | 24 August 1985 | 2 |
| 7 September 1985 | 1 | Sacred Heart | Dio | 4 | 7 September 1985 | 1 |
| 7 September 1985 | 4 | The Head on the Door | The Cure | 7 | 7 September 1985 | 1 |
| 28 September 1985 | 11 | Hounds of Love | Kate Bush | 1 | 28 September 1985 | 3 |
| 28 September 1985 | 3 | In Square Circle | Stevie Wonder | 5 | 28 September 1985 | 1 |
| 28 September 1985 | 2 | Here's to Future Days | Thompson Twins | 5 | 28 September 1985 | 1 |
| 5 October 1985 | 3 | Vital Idol | Billy Idol | 7 | 12 October 1985 | 2 |
| 19 October 1985 | 2 | The Gift | Midge Ure | 2 | 19 October 1985 | 1 |
| 19 October 1985 | 12 | The Love Songs | George Benson | 1 | 26 October 1985 | 2 |
| 26 October 1985 | 2 | Live After Death | Iron Maiden | 2 | 26 October 1985 | 1 |
| 26 October 1985 | 4 | Out Now!! 2 | Various artists | 3 | 26 October 1985 | 2 |
| 26 October 1985 | 5 | Love | The Cult | 4 | 26 October 1985 | 1 |
| 26 October 1985 | 3 | The Singles 81→85 | Depeche Mode | 6 | 2 November 1985 | 1 |
| 26 October 1985 | 14 | World Machine ♦ | Level 42 | 3 | 8 February 1986 | 2 |
| 2 November 1985 | 10 | Once Upon a Time | Simple Minds | 1 | 2 November 1985 | 1 |
| 9 November 1985 | 2 | Afterburner | ZZ Top | 2 | 9 November 1985 | 1 |
| 9 November 1985 | 1 | Power Windows | Rush | 9 | 9 November 1985 | 1 |
| 16 November 1985 | 10 | Promise | Sade | 1 | 16 November 1985 | 2 |
| 16 November 1985 | 2 | Ice on Fire | Elton John | 3 | 16 November 1985 | 1 |
| 16 November 1985 | 2 | Jennifer Rush | Jennifer Rush | 7 | 16 November 1985 | 2 |
| 16 November 1985 | 9 | The Singles Collection | Spandau Ballet | 3 | 7 December 1985 | 1 |
| 23 November 1985 | 8 | The Greatest Hits of 1985 | Various artists | 1 | 30 November 1985 | 1 |
| 23 November 1985 | 1 | Songs to Learn and Sing | Echo & the Bunnymen | 6 | 30 November 1985 | 1 |
| 23 November 1985 | 1 | Rock Anthems: 24 Tracks That Rocked a Generation | Various artists | 10 | 30 November 1985 | 1 |
| 30 November 1985 | 1 | Easy Pieces | Lloyd Cole and the Commotions | 5 | 30 November 1985 | 1 |
| 30 November 1985 | 5 | The Love Album: 16 Classic Love Songs | Various artists | 7 | 30 November 1985 | 1 |
| 30 November 1985 | 3 | Love Hurts | Elaine Paige | 8 | 30 November 1985 | 1 |
| 30 November 1985 | 8 | Now – The Christmas Album | Various artists | 1 | 21 December 1985 | 2 |
| 7 December 1985 | 8 | Now That's What I Call Music! 6 | Various artists | 1 | 7 December 1985 | 4 |
| 7 December 1985 | 6 | Hits 3 | Various artists | 2 | 7 December 1985 | 2 |

== See also ==
- 1985 in British music
- List of number-one albums from the 1980s (UK)
