= List of UK top-ten albums in 1988 =

The UK Albums Chart is one of many music charts compiled by the Official Charts Company that calculates the best-selling albums of the week in the United Kingdom. Before 2004, the chart was only based on the sales of physical albums. This list shows albums that peaked in the Top 10 of the UK Albums Chart during 1988, as well as albums which peaked in 1987 and 1989 but were in the top 10 in 1988. The entry date is when the album appeared in the top ten for the first time (week ending, as published by the Official Charts Company, which is six days after the chart is announced).

The first new number-one album of the year was Popped In Souled Out by Wet Wet Wet. Overall, eighteen different albums peaked at number-one in 1988.

== Top-ten albums ==
Key

| Symbol | Meaning |
|---|---|
| ‡ | Album peaked in 1987 but still in chart in 1988. |
| ♦ | Album released in 1988 but peaked in 1989. |
| Entered | The date that the album first appeared in the chart. |
| Peak | Highest position that the album reached in the UK Albums Chart. |

| Entered (week ending) | Weeks in top 10 | Single | Artist | Peak | Peak reached (week ending) | Weeks at peak |
Albums in 1987
| 28 February 1987 | 7 | Give Me the Reason | Luther Vandross | 3 | 5 March 1988 | 2 |
| 18 April 1987 | 13 | Raindancing ‡ | Alison Moyet | 2 | 18 April 1987 | 2 |
| 25 April 1987 | 38 | Tango in the Night ‡ | Fleetwood Mac | 1 | 31 October 1987 | 5 |
| 13 June 1987 | 23 | Whitney ‡ | Whitney Houston | 1 | 13 June 1987 | 6 |
| 25 July 1987 | 23 | Introducing the Hardline According to Terence Trent D'Arby ‡ | Terence Trent D'Arby | 1 | 25 July 1987 | 9 |
| 8 August 1987 | 5 | Hearsay | Alexander O'Neal | 4 | 26 March 1988 | 1 |
| 12 September 1987 | 38 | Bad ‡ | Michael Jackson | 1 | 12 September 1987 | 5 |
| 19 September 1987 | 15 | Actually ‡ | Pet Shop Boys | 2 | 19 September 1987 | 1 |
| 3 October 1987 | 31 | Popped In Souled Out | Wet Wet Wet | 1 | 16 January 1988 | 1 |
| 17 October 1987 | 4 | Tunnel of Love ‡ | Bruce Springsteen | 1 | 17 October 1987 | 1 |
| 31 October 1987 | 13 | The Christians ‡ | The Christians | 2 | 31 October 1987 | 2 |
| 7 November 1987 | 18 | Bridge of Spies ‡ | T'Pau | 1 | 21 November 1987 | 1 |
| 7 November 1987 | 9 | The Singles ‡ | The Pretenders | 6 | 14 November 1987 | 1 |
| 14 November 1987 | 8 | Faith ‡ | George Michael | 1 | 14 November 1987 | 1 |
| 14 November 1987 | 9 | All the Best! ‡ | Paul McCartney | 2 | 14 November 1987 | 2 |
| 28 November 1987 | 15 | Whenever You Need Somebody ‡ | Rick Astley | 1 | 28 November 1987 | 1 |
| 5 December 1987 | 7 | Now That’s What I Call Music! 10 ‡ | Various artists | 1 | 5 December 1987 | 6 |
| 5 December 1987 | 6 | Hits 7 ‡ | Various artists | 2 | 12 December 1987 | 2 |
Albums in 1988
| 23 January 1988 | 12 | Turn Back the Clock | Johnny Hates Jazz | 1 | 23 January 1988 | 1 |
| 23 January 1988 | 9 | Heaven on Earth | Belinda Carlisle | 4 | 18 June 1988 | 1 |
| 23 January 1988 | 4 | Jack Mix '88: The Best of Mirage | Mirage | 7 | 6 February 1988 | 1 |
| 23 January 1988 | 1 | Life in the Fast Lane | Various artists | 10 | 6 February 1988 | 1 |
| 30 January 1988 | 2 | If I Should Fall from Grace with God | The Pogues | 3 | 30 January 1988 | 1 |
| 30 January 1988 | 5 | Come into My Life | Joyce Sims | 5 | 13 February 1988 | 1 |
| 6 February 1988 | 8 | Kick | INXS | 9 | 6 February 1988 | 5 |
| 13 February 1988 | 2 | Blow Up Your Video | AC/DC | 2 | 13 February 1988 | 1 |
| 27 February 1988 | 2 | Tiffany | Tiffany | 5 | 27 February 1988 | 1 |
| 27 February 1988 | 1 | All About Eve | All About Eve | 7 | 27 February 1988 | 1 |
| 12 March 1988 | 1 | Children | The Mission | 2 | 12 March 1988 | 1 |
| 12 March 1988 | 9 | The Best of OMD | Orchestral Manoeuvres in the Dark | 2 | 19 March 1988 | 3 |
| 12 March 1988 | 3 | Unforgettable – 18 Classic Songs of Love | Various artists | 5 | 19 March 1988 | 1 |
| 12 March 1988 | 1 | Now and Zen | Robert Plant | 10 | 12 March 1988 | 1 |
| 19 March 1988 | 2 | Tear Down These Walls | Billy Ocean | 3 | 19 March 1988 | 1 |
| 19 March 1988 | 1 | Who's Better, Who's Best | The Who | 10 | 19 March 1988 | 1 |
| 26 March 1988 | 2 | Viva Hate | Morrissey | 1 | 26 March 1988 | 1 |
| 26 March 1988 | 2 | Naked | Talking Heads | 3 | 26 March 1988 | 1 |
| 26 March 1988 | 1 | From Langley Park to Memphis | Prefab Sprout | 5 | 26 March 1988 | 1 |
| 2 April 1988 | 7 | Now That’s What I Call Music! 11 | Various artists | 1 | 2 April 1988 | 3 |
| 2 April 1988 | 1 | The Story of the Clash, Volume 1 | The Clash | 7 | 2 April 1988 | 1 |
| 2 April 1988 | 2 | Tina Live in Europe | Tina Turner | 8 | 2 April 1988 | 1 |
| 9 April 1988 | 16 | Push | Bros | 2 | 9 April 1988 | 3 |
| 9 April 1988 | 1 | Wings of Heaven | Magnum | 5 | 9 April 1988 | 1 |
| 9 April 1988 | 1 | Lovely | The Primitives | 6 | 9 April 1988 | 1 |
| 9 April 1988 | 1 | Distant Thunder | Aswad | 10 | 9 April 1988 | 1 |
| 16 April 1988 | 19 | Dirty Dancing: Original Soundtrack from the Vestron Motion Picture | Various artists | 4 | 7 May 1988 | 1 |
| 16 April 1988 | 4 | Hip Hop and Rapping in the House | Various artists | 5 | 7 May 1988 | 1 |
| 23 April 1988 | 2 | Seventh Son of a Seventh Son | Iron Maiden | 1 | 23 April 1988 | 1 |
| 30 April 1988 | 11 | The Innocents | Erasure | 1 | 30 April 1988 | 2 |
| 30 April 1988 | 1 | Barbed Wire Kisses | The Jesus and Mary Chain | 9 | 30 April 1988 | 1 |
| 14 May 1988 | 2 | Stay on These Roads | A-ha | 2 | 14 May 1988 | 1 |
| 14 May 1988 | 7 | Stronger Than Pride | Sade | 3 | 14 May 1988 | 2 |
| 14 May 1988 | 6 | More Dirty Dancing: More Original Music from the Hit Motion Picture | Various artists | 3 | 28 May 1988 | 1 |
| 21 May 1988 | 2 | Lovesexy | Prince | 1 | 21 May 1988 | 1 |
| 21 May 1988 | 1 | Now That's What I Call Quite Good | The Housemartins | 8 | 21 May 1988 | 1 |
| 28 May 1988 | 7 | Nite Flite | Various artists | 1 | 4 June 1988 | 4 |
| 28 May 1988 | 10 | The First of a Million Kisses | Fairground Attraction | 2 | 27 August 1988 | 3 |
| 4 June 1988 | 4 | Motown Dance Party | Various artists | 3 | 4 June 1988 | 1 |
| 11 June 1988 | 1 | Love | Aztec Camera | 10 | 11 June 1988 | 1 |
| 18 June 1988 | 1 | People | Hothouse Flowers | 2 | 18 June 1988 | 1 |
| 18 June 1988 | 1 | Provision | Scritti Politti | 8 | 18 June 1988 | 1 |
| 25 June 1988 | 16 | Tracy Chapman | Tracy Chapman | 1 | 2 July 1988 | 3 |
| 2 July 1988 | 10 | Idol Songs: 11 of the Best | Billy Idol | 2 | 9 July 1988 | 1 |
| 2 July 1988 | 3 | Roll with It | Steve Winwood | 4 | 2 July 1988 | 2 |
| 9 July 1988 | 3 | The Collection | Barry White | 5 | 16 July 1988 | 1 |
| 9 July 1988 | 2 | Jack Mix in Full Effect | Mirage | 7 | 16 July 1988 | 1 |
| 16 July 1988 | 29 | Kylie | Kylie Minogue | 1 | 27 August 1988 | 6 |
| 23 July 1988 | 9 | Now That’s What I Call Music! 12 | Various artists | 1 | 23 July 1988 | 5 |
| 23 July 1988 | 1 | Substance | Joy Division | 7 | 23 July 1988 | 1 |
| 30 July 1988 | 5 | Hits 8 | Various artists | 2 | 30 July 1988 | 2 |
| 30 July 1988 | 1 | It Takes a Nation of Millions to Hold Us Back | Public Enemy | 8 | 30 July 1988 | 1 |
| 13 August 1988 | 5 | The Greatest Ever Rock 'N' Roll Mix | Various artists | 8 | 20 August 1988 | 1 |
| 20 August 1988 | 4 | The Best of Eagles | Eagles | 8 | 27 August 1988 | 3 |
| 3 September 1988 | 6 | Hot City Nights | Various artists | 1 | 24 September 1988 | 1 |
| 3 September 1988 | 2 | So Good | Mica Paris | 6 | 3 September 1988 | 1 |
| 10 September 1988 | 6 | Rap Trax | Various artists | 3 | 24 September 1988 | 2 |
| 17 September 1988 | 1 | Rank | The Smiths | 2 | 17 September 1988 | 1 |
| 17 September 1988 | 1 | ...And Justice for All | Metallica | 4 | 17 September 1988 | 1 |
| 24 September 1988 | 2 | Sunshine on Leith | The Proclaimers | 6 | 24 September 1988 | 1 |
| 24 September 1988 | 2 | Buster: The Original Motion Picture Soundtrack | Various artists | 6 | 1 October 1988 | 1 |
| 24 September 1988 | 5 | Conscience | Womack & Womack | 4 | 1 October 1988 | 1 |
| 1 October 1988 | 3 | New Jersey | Bon Jovi | 1 | 1 October 1988 | 2 |
| 1 October 1988 | 3 | Staring at the Sun | Level 42 | 2 | 1 October 1988 | 2 |
| 8 October 1988 | 3 | Revolutions | Jean-Michel Jarre | 2 | 15 October 1988 | 1 |
| 8 October 1988 | 1 | Peace in Our Time | Big Country | 9 | 8 October 1988 | 1 |
| 15 October 1988 | 2 | Flying Colours | Chris de Burgh | 1 | 15 October 1988 | 1 |
| 15 October 1988 | 1 | Pop Art | Transvision Vamp | 4 | 15 October 1988 | 1 |
| 15 October 1988 | 2 | Ones on 1 | Various artists | 10 | 15 October 1988 | 2 |
| 22 October 1988 | 4 | Rattle and Hum | U2 | 1 | 22 October 1988 | 1 |
| 22 October 1988 | 5 | Introspective | Pet Shop Boys | 2 | 22 October 1988 | 1 |
| 22 October 1988 | 2 | To Whom It May Concern | The Pasadenas | 3 | 22 October 1988 | 1 |
| 22 October 1988 | 12 | The Greatest Hits Collection ♦ | Bananarama | 3 | 7 January 1989 | 1 |
| 29 October 1988 | 13 | Money for Nothing | Dire Straits | 1 | 29 October 1988 | 3 |
| 29 October 1988 | 2 | Any Love | Luther Vandross | 3 | 29 October 1988 | 1 |
| 29 October 1988 | 4 | New Light Through Old Windows | Chris Rea | 5 | 12 November 1988 | 1 |
| 29 October 1988 | 1 | Giving You the Best That I Got | Anita Baker | 9 | 29 October 1988 | 1 |
| 29 October 1988 | 11 | Watermark | Enya | 5 | 5 November 1988 | 1 |
| 5 November 1988 | 2 | Rage | T'Pau | 4 | 5 November 1988 | 1 |
| 5 November 1988 | 4 | Smash Hits Party '88 | Various artists | 6 | 5 November 1988 | 1 |
| 12 November 1988 | 3 | Greatest Hits | The Human League | 3 | 12 November 1988 | 1 |
| 12 November 1988 | 4 | Soft Metal | Various artists | 7 | 19 November 1988 | 1 |
| 19 November 1988 | 2 | The Memphis Sessions | Wet Wet Wet | 3 | 19 November 1988 | 1 |
| 19 November 1988 | 9 | Private Collection: 1979–1988 | Cliff Richard | 1 | 24 December 1988 | 2 |
| 19 November 1988 | 7 | The Ultimate Collection | Bryan Ferry and Roxy Music | 6 | 19 November 1988 | 2 |
| 26 November 1988 | 4 | Wanted | Yazz | 3 | 26 November 1988 | 1 |
| 26 November 1988 | 6 | The Premiere Collection: The Best of Andrew Lloyd Webber | Andrew Lloyd Webber | 3 | 24 December 1988 | 1 |
| 3 December 1988 | 6 | Now That’s What I Call Music! 13 | Various artists | 1 | 3 December 1988 | 4 |
| 3 December 1988 | 11 | Greatest Hits | Fleetwood Mac | 3 | 31 December 1988 | 3 |
| 3 December 1988 | 1 | Get Even | Brother Beyond | 9 | 3 December 1988 | 1 |
| 10 December 1988 | 2 | Hold Me in Your Arms | Rick Astley | 8 | 10 December 1988 | 1 |
| 17 December 1988 | 4 | The Hits Album 9 ♦ | Various artists | 5 | 7 January 1989 | 1 |
| 31 December 1988 | 9 | The Legendary Roy Orbison ♦ | Roy Orbison | 1 | 21 January 1989 | 3 |

== See also ==
- 1988 in British music
- List of number-one albums from the 1980s (UK)
