= List of UK top-ten albums in 1987 =

The UK Albums Chart is one of many music charts compiled by the Official Charts Company that calculates the best-selling albums of the week in the United Kingdom. Before 2004, the chart was only based on the sales of physical albums. This list shows albums that peaked in the Top 10 of the UK Albums Chart during 1987, as well as albums which peaked in 1986 and 1988 but were in the top 10 in 1987. The entry date is when the album appeared in the top ten for the first time (week ending, as published by the Official Charts Company, which is six days after the chart is announced).

The first new number-one album of the year was The Whole Story by Kate Bush. Overall, twenty different albums peaked at number-one in 1987.

== Top-ten albums ==
Key

Symbol	Meaning
‡	Album peaked in 1986 but still in chart in 1987.
♦	Album released in 1987 but peaked in 1988.
Entered	The date that the album first appeared in the chart.
Peak	Highest position that the album reached in the UK Albums Chart.

Entered (week ending)	Weeks in top 10	Single	Artist	Peak	Peak reached (week ending)	Weeks at peak
Albums in 1986
31 May 1986	10	So ‡	Peter Gabriel	1	31 May 1986	2
31 May 1986	19	Picture Book ‡	Simply Red	2	7 June 1986	1
21 June 1986	18	Invisible Touch ‡	Genesis	1	21 June 1986	3
12 July 1986	36	True Blue ‡	Madonna	1	12 July 1986	6
12 July 1986	21	Revenge ‡	Eurythmics	3	12 July 1986	4
30 August 1986	28	Silk & Steel ‡	Five Star	1	27 September 1986	1
13 September 1986	33	Graceland ‡	Paul Simon	1	4 October 1986	8
20 September 1986	10	Slippery When Wet ‡	Bon Jovi	6	29 November 1986	2
8 November 1986	11	Every Breath You Take: The Singles ‡	The Police	1	8 November 1986	2
8 November 1986	4	Get Close	The Pretenders	6	31 January 1987	1
22 November 1986	8	Hits 5 ‡	Various artists	1	22 November 1986	2
22 November 1986	14	The Whole Story	Kate Bush	1	17 January 1987	2
6 December 1986	9	Now That's What I Call Music! 8 ‡	Various artists	1	6 December 1986	6
13 December 1986	16	Live Magic	Queen	3	24 January 1987	1
Albums in 1987
3 January 1987	1	The Singing Detective (Music from the BBC TV serial)	Various artists	10	3 January 1987	1
17 January 1987	7	Different Light	The Bangles	3	31 January 1987	2
24 January 1987	4	Sweet Freedom	Michael McDonald	6	7 February 1987	1
24 January 1987	1	The House of Blue Light	Deep Purple	10	24 January 1987	1
31 January 1987	4	No More the Fool	Elkie Brooks	5	7 February 1987	1
7 February 1987	7	August	Eric Clapton	3	14 February 1987	1
7 February 1987	1	The Very Best of Elkie Brooks	Elkie Brooks	10	7 February 1987	1
14 February 1987	1	The Cost of Loving	The Style Council	2	14 February 1987	1
21 February 1987	7	The Phantom of the Opera	Original London Cast	1	21 February 1987	3
21 February 1987	7	The Very Best of Hot Chocolate	Hot Chocolate	1	14 March 1987	1
28 February 1987	7	Give Me the Reason ♦	Luther Vandross	3	5 March 1988	2
28 February 1987	2	The Final Countdown	Europe	9	7 March 1987	1
7 March 1987	3	The World Won't Listen	The Smiths	2	7 March 1987	1
14 March 1987	1	Wild Frontier	Gary Moore	8	14 March 1987	1
21 March 1987	28	The Joshua Tree	U2	1	21 March 1987	2
21 March 1987	7	Men and Women	Simply Red	2	21 March 1987	1
21 March 1987	6	Move Closer	Various artists	4	28 March 1987	2
28 March 1987	12	Running in the Family	Level 42	2	28 March 1987	1
4 April 1987	8	Now That's What I Call Music! 9	Various artists	1	4 April 1987	5
11 April 1987	2	Sign o' the Times	Prince	4	11 April 1987	1
11 April 1987	2	The Circus	Erasure	6	11 April 1987	1
11 April 1987	1	Whitesnake 1987	Whitesnake	8	11 April 1987	1
11 April 1987	1	Into the Fire	Bryan Adams	10	11 April 1987	1
18 April 1987	13	Raindancing	Alison Moyet	2	18 April 1987	2
18 April 1987	1	Electric	The Cult	4	18 April 1987	1
25 April 1987	11	F.L.M.	Mel and Kim	3	25 April 1987	2
25 April 1987	38	Tango in the Night	Fleetwood Mac	1	31 October 1987	5
25 April 1987	2	This Time – The First Four Years	Culture Club	8	2 May 1987	1
2 May 1987	1	Never Let Me Down	David Bowie	6	2 May 1987	1
9 May 1987	13	Keep Your Distance	Curiosity Killed the Cat	1	9 May 1987	2
9 May 1987	9	Solitude Standing	Suzanne Vega	2	9 May 1987	4
23 May 1987	7	It's Better to Travel	Swing Out Sister	1	23 May 1987	2
6 June 1987	7	Live in the City of Light	Simple Minds	1	6 June 1987	1
6 June 1987	1	Kiss Me, Kiss Me, Kiss Me	The Cure	6	6 June 1987	1
13 June 1987	23	Whitney	Whitney Houston	1	13 June 1987	6
13 June 1987	3	Sgt. Pepper's Lonely Hearts Club Band	The Beatles	3	13 June 1987	1
13 June 1987	2	Licensed to Ill	The Beastie Boys	7	13 June 1987	2
20 June 1987	1	Friends and Lovers: Sixteen Love Songs	Various artists	10	20 June 1987	1
27 June 1987	6	The Return of Bruno	Bruce Willis	4	11 July 1987	1
4 July 1987	2	Clutching at Straws	Marillion	2	4 July 1987	1
4 July 1987	3	Atlantic Soul Classics	Various artists	9	4 July 1987	2
11 July 1987	2	Control	Janet Jackson	8	11 July 1987	2
11 July 1987	1	Hits Revival	Various artists	10	11 July 1987	1
18 July 1987	1	Echo & the Bunnymen	Echo & the Bunnymen	4	18 July 1987	1
18 July 1987	1	The Island Story	Various artists	9	18 July 1987	1
25 July 1987	23	Introducing the Hardline According to Terence Trent D'Arby	Terence Trent D'Arby	1	25 July 1987	9
25 July 1987	9	Hits 6	Various artists	1	1 August 1987	5
25 July 1987	5	Bad Animals	Heart	7	8 August 1987	3
25 July 1987	6	Sixties Mix	Various artists	3	15 August 1987	2
1 August 1987	6	Who's That Girl: Original Motion Picture Soundtrack	Madonna and Various artists	4	1 August 1987	1
8 August 1987	5	Hearsay ♦	Alexander O'Neal	4	26 March 1988	1
22 August 1987	1	Dream Evil	Dio	8	22 August 1987	1
29 August 1987	4	Hysteria	Def Leppard	1	29 August 1987	1
29 August 1987	4	Substance 1987	New Order	3	29 August 1987	2
29 August 1987	4	Presley – The All Time Greatest Hits	Elvis Presley	4	29 August 1987	1
5 September 1987	5	Changing Faces – The Very Best of 10cc and Godley & Creme	10cc and Godley & Creme	4	19 September 1987	1
12 September 1987	38	Bad	Michael Jackson	1	12 September 1987	5
12 September 1987	1	Darklands	The Jesus and Mary Chain	5	12 September 1987	1
19 September 1987	15	Actually	Pet Shop Boys	2	19 September 1987	1
19 September 1987	2	A Momentary Lapse of Reason	Pink Floyd	3	19 September 1987	1
26 September 1987	5	Dancing with Strangers	Chris Rea	2	26 September 1987	1
26 September 1987	4	Wonderful Life	Black	3	26 September 1987	2
26 September 1987	4	Always Guaranteed	Cliff Richard	5	26 September 1987	1
26 September 1987	2	Between the Lines	Five Star	7	26 September 1987	1
26 September 1987	6	The Cream of Eric Clapton	Eric Clapton	3	17 October 1987	1
3 October 1987	31	Popped In Souled Out ♦	Wet Wet Wet	1	16 January 1988	1
3 October 1987	3	Now! Smash Hits	Various artists	5	10 October 1987	1
3 October 1987	1	The People Who Grinned Themselves to Death	The Housemartins	9	3 October 1987	1
10 October 1987	2	Strangeways, Here We Come	The Smiths	2	10 October 1987	1
10 October 1987	1	Music for the Masses	Depeche Mode	10	10 October 1987	1
17 October 1987	4	Tunnel of Love	Bruce Springsteen	1	17 October 1987	1
17 October 1987	1	Red	The Communards	4	17 October 1987	1
24 October 1987	3	...Nothing Like the Sun	Sting	1	24 October 1987	1
24 October 1987	3	E.S.P.	Bee Gees	5	24 October 1987	2
24 October 1987	1	Alphabet City	ABC	7	24 October 1987	1
31 October 1987	13	The Christians	The Christians	2	31 October 1987	2
7 November 1987	18	Bridge of Spies	T'Pau	1	21 November 1987	1
7 November 1987	7	The Best of UB40 – Volume One	UB40	3	7 November 1987	3
7 November 1987	1	Crazy Nights	Kiss	4	7 November 1987	1
7 November 1987	4	Best Shots	Pat Benatar	6	7 November 1987	1
7 November 1987	1	Mainstream	Lloyd Cole and the Commotions	9	7 November 1987	1
7 November 1987	9	The Singles	The Pretenders	6	14 November 1987	1
14 November 1987	8	Faith	George Michael	1	14 November 1987	1
14 November 1987	9	All the Best!	Paul McCartney	2	14 November 1987	2
14 November 1987	1	Bête Noire	Bryan Ferry	9	14 November 1987	1
14 November 1987	1	Cloud Nine	George Harrison	10	14 November 1987	1
21 November 1987	1	Savage	Eurythmics	7	21 November 1987	1
21 November 1987	1	From Motown with Love	Various artists	9	21 November 1987	1
21 November 1987	1	Hold Your Fire	Rush	10	21 November 1987	1
28 November 1987	15	Whenever You Need Somebody	Rick Astley	1	28 November 1987	1
28 November 1987	2	You Can Dance	Madonna	5	28 November 1987	1
28 November 1987	1	Floodland	The Sisters of Mercy	9	28 November 1987	1
5 December 1987	7	Now That’s What I Call Music! 10	Various artists	1	5 December 1987	6
5 December 1987	6	Hits 7	Various artists	2	12 December 1987	2

== See also ==
- 1987 in British music
- List of number-one albums from the 1980s (UK)
