= List of UK top-ten albums in 1989 =

The UK Albums Chart is one of many music charts compiled by the Official Charts Company that calculates the best-selling albums of the week in the United Kingdom. Before 2004, the chart was only based on the sales of physical albums. This list shows albums that peaked in the Top 10 of the UK Albums Chart during 1989, as well as albums which peaked in 1988 and 1990 but were in the top 10 in 1989. The entry date is when the album appeared in the top ten for the first time (week ending, as published by the Official Charts Company, which is six days after the chart is announced).

The first new number-one album of the year was The Legendary Roy Orbison by Roy Orbison. Overall, twenty-five different albums peaked at number-one in 1989, with Gloria Estefan (2) having the most albums hit that position.

== Top-ten albums ==
Key

Symbol	Meaning
‡	Album peaked in 1987 or 1988 but still in chart in 1989.
♦	Album released in 1989 but peaked in 1990.
Entered	The date that the album first appeared in the chart.
Peak	Highest position that the album reached in the UK Albums Chart.

Entered (week ending)	Weeks in top 10	Single	Artist	Peak	Peak reached (week ending)	Weeks at peak
Albums in 1987
12 September 1987	38	Bad ‡	Michael Jackson	1	12 September 1987	5
Albums in 1988
6 February 1988	8	Kick ‡	INXS	9	6 February 1988	5
9 April 1988	16	Push ‡	Bros	2	9 April 1988	3
30 April 1988	11	The Innocents ‡	Erasure	1	30 April 1988	2
16 July 1988	29	Kylie ‡	Kylie Minogue	1	27 August 1988	6
22 October 1988	12	The Greatest Hits Collection	Bananarama	3	7 January 1989	1
29 October 1988	13	Money for Nothing ‡	Dire Straits	1	29 October 1988	3
29 October 1988	11	Watermark ‡	Enya	5	5 November 1988	1
19 November 1988	9	Private Collection: 1979–1988 ‡	Cliff Richard	1	24 December 1988	2
19 November 1988	7	The Ultimate Collection ‡	Bryan Ferry and Roxy Music	6	19 November 1988	2
26 November 1988	4	Wanted ‡	Yazz	3	26 November 1988	1
3 December 1988	6	Now That’s What I Call Music! 13 ‡	Various artists	1	3 December 1988	4
3 December 1988	11	Greatest Hits ‡	Fleetwood Mac	3	31 December 1988	3
17 December 1988	4	The Hits Album 9	Various artists	5	7 January 1989	1
31 December 1988	9	The Legendary Roy Orbison	Roy Orbison	1	21 January 1989	3
Albums in 1989
21 January 1989	17	Anything for You	Gloria Estefan and Miami Sound Machine	1	25 March 1989	1
28 January 1989	5	Living Years	Mike and the Mechanics	2	4 February 1989	1
4 February 1989	9	Ancient Heart	Tanita Tikaram	3	4 March 1989	2
4 February 1989	1	Close	Kim Wilde	8	4 February 1989	1
4 February 1989	1	Love Supreme	Diana Ross & the Supremes	10	4 February 1989	1
11 February 1989	2	Technique	New Order	1	11 February 1989	1
11 February 1989	5	Mystery Girl	Roy Orbison	2	11 February 1989	2
11 February 1989	1	Electric Youth	Debbie Gibson	8	11 February 1989	1
18 February 1989	17	The Raw & the Cooked	Fine Young Cannibals	1	18 February 1989	1
18 February 1989	2	Spike	Elvis Costello	5	18 February 1989	1
25 February 1989	26	A New Flame	Simply Red	1	25 February 1989	7
25 February 1989	3	Hysteria	Def Leppard	7	25 February 1989	1
4 March 1989	1	The Big Area	Then Jerico	4	4 March 1989	1
4 March 1989	1	Remote/Bitter Suite	Hue and Cry	10	4 March 1989	1
11 March 1989	21	Don't Be Cruel	Bobby Brown	3	22 July 1989	2
11 March 1989	5	Stop!	Sam Brown	4	18 March 1989	1
11 March 1989	2	True Love Ways: 20 Classic Love Songs of a Legend	Buddy Holly	8	11 March 1989	2
18 March 1989	5	The Singular Adventures of The Style Council	The Style Council	3	18 March 1989	1
25 March 1989	3	Southside	Texas	3	25 March 1989	1
25 March 1989	1	101	Depeche Mode	5	25 March 1989	1
1 April 1989	12	Like a Prayer	Madonna	1	1 April 1989	2
1 April 1989	2	Original Soundtrack	S'Express	5	1 April 1989	1
8 April 1989	15	Appetite for Destruction	Guns N' Roses	5	22 July 1989	1
15 April 1989	10	When the World Knows Your Name	Deacon Blue	1	15 April 1989	2
15 April 1989	6	Forever Your Girl ♦	Paula Abdul	3	12 May 1990	1
15 April 1989	1	The Headless Children	W.A.S.P.	8	15 April 1989	1
22 April 1989	1	Sonic Temple	The Cult	3	22 April 1989	1
22 April 1989	17	Club Classics Vol. One	Soul II Soul	1	15 July 1989	1
29 April 1989	3	Everything	The Bangles	5	6 May 1989	1
29 April 1989	1	Doolittle	Pixies	8	29 April 1989	1
6 May 1989	4	Blast	Holly Johnson	1	6 May 1989	1
13 May 1989	8	Street Fighting Years	Simple Minds	1	13 May 1989	1
13 May 1989	29	Ten Good Reasons	Jason Donovan	1	20 May 1989	4
13 May 1989	1	Disintegration	The Cure	3	13 May 1989	1
20 May 1989	3	Paradise	Inner City	3	20 May 1989	2
20 May 1989	9	Pastpresent	Clannad	5	27 May 1989	1
20 May 1989	1	Kaleidoscope World	Swing Out Sister	9	20 May 1989	1
20 May 1989	1	Good to Be Back	Natalie Cole	10	20 May 1989	1
27 May 1989	1	Mind Bomb	The The	4	27 May 1989	1
3 June 1989	9	The Miracle	Queen	1	3 June 1989	1
3 June 1989	2	Tin Machine	Tin Machine	3	3 June 1989	1
10 June 1989	3	The Other Side of the Mirror	Stevie Nicks	3	10 June 1989	1
17 June 1989	9	Raw Like Sushi	Neneh Cherry	2	17 June 1989	1
17 June 1989	3	Flowers in the Dirt	Paul McCartney	1	24 June 1989	1
1 July 1989	11	Batman	Prince	1	1 July 1989	1
1 July 1989	1	A Night to Remember	Cyndi Lauper	9	1 July 1989	1
8 July 1989	8	Velveteen	Transvision Vamp	1	8 July 1989	1
8 July 1989	1	Full Moon Fever	Tom Petty	8	8 July 1989	1
29 July 1989	7	The Twelve Commandments of Dance	London Boys	2	29 July 1989	1
29 July 1989	1	Peace and Love	The Pogues	5	29 July 1989	1
5 August 1989	13	Cuts Both Ways	Gloria Estefan	1	5 August 1989	6
26 August 1989	4	Trash	Alice Cooper	2	26 August 1989	1
26 August 1989	1	Big Bang!	Fuzzbox	5	26 August 1989	1
26 August 1989	3	Choices – The Singles Collection	The Blow Monkeys	5	2 September 1989	1
2 September 1989	4	Imagination – All The Hits	Imagination	4	9 September 1989	1
2 September 1989	1	Sacred Heart	Shakespears Sister	9	2 September 1989	1
9 September 1989	3	Adeva!	Adeva	6	9 September 1989	1
9 September 1989	2	SingaLongaWarYears!	Max Bygraves	5	16 September 1989	1
16 September 1989	2	Aspects of Love	Original London Cast	1	16 September 1989	1
16 September 1989	1	Dr. Feelgood	Mötley Crüe	4	16 September 1989	1
23 September 1989	5	We Too Are One	Eurythmics	1	23 September 1989	1
23 September 1989	2	Steel Wheels	The Rolling Stones	2	23 September 1989	1
23 September 1989	3	Pump	Aerosmith	3	23 September 1989	1
23 September 1989	17	Sleeping with the Past ♦	Elton John	1	28 July 1990	5
30 September 1989	18	Foreign Affair	Tina Turner	1	30 September 1989	1
30 September 1989	2	Janet Jackson's Rhythm Nation 1814	Janet Jackson	4	30 September 1989	1
30 September 1989	2	Repeat Offender	Richard Marx	8	30 September 1989	1
7 October 1989	4	The Seeds of Love	Tears for Fears	1	7 October 1989	1
7 October 1989	1	Seasons End	Marillion	7	7 October 1989	1
14 October 1989	4	Crossroads	Tracy Chapman	1	14 October 1989	1
14 October 1989	1	Hup	The Wonder Stuff	5	14 October 1989	1
14 October 1989	2	Oh Mercy	Bob Dylan	6	14 October 1989	1
21 October 1989	16	Enjoy Yourself	Kylie Minogue	1	21 October 1989	1
21 October 1989	1	Results	Liza Minnelli	6	21 October 1989	1
28 October 1989	3	Wild!	Erasure	1	28 October 1989	2
28 October 1989	2	The Sensual World	Kate Bush	2	28 October 1989	1
28 October 1989	1	The Time	Bros	4	28 October 1989	1
28 October 1989	4	All or Nothing/2x2	Milli Vanilli	6	18 November 1989	1
28 October 1989	1	Scarlet and Other Stories	All About Eve	9	18 November 1989	1
4 November 1989	2	Welcome to the Beautiful South	The Beautiful South	2	4 November 1989	1
4 November 1989	3	Runaway Horses	Belinda Carlisle	4	4 November 1989	2
4 November 1989	1	Storm Front	Billy Joel	5	4 November 1989	1
4 November 1989	4	Greatest Hits	Billy Ocean	4	18 November 1989	1
4 November 1989	8	Spark to a Flame: The Very Best of Chris de Burgh	Chris de Burgh	4	25 November 1989	1
11 November 1989	20	The Road to Hell	Chris Rea	1	11 November 1989	3
11 November 1989	7	Holding Back the River	Wet Wet Wet	2	11 November 1989	1
11 November 1989	5	Stronger	Cliff Richard	7	25 November 1989	1
18 November 1989	9	Journeyman ♦	Eric Clapton	2	17 February 1990	2
18 November 1989	2	Level Best	Level 42	5	18 November 1989	1
25 November 1989	11	The Best of Rod Stewart	Rod Stewart	3	25 November 1989	1
25 November 1989	2	Decade	Duran Duran	5	25 November 1989	1
25 November 1989	1	Slip of the Tongue	Whitesnake	10	25 November 1989	1
2 December 1989	42	...But Seriously	Phil Collins	1	2 December 1989	15
2 December 1989	16	Affection	Lisa Stansfield	2	2 December 1989	2
2 December 1989	1	Addictions: Volume 1	Robert Palmer	7	2 December 1989	1
9 December 1989	7	Jive Bunny: The Album	Jive Bunny	2	9 December 1989	5
9 December 1989	9	Hangin' Tough ♦	New Kids on the Block	2	20 January 1990	1
9 December 1989	12	Labour of Love II ♦	UB40	3	19 May 1990	1
9 December 1989	2	After the Laughter	Freddie Starr	10	9 December 1989	2

== See also ==
- 1989 in British music
- List of number-one albums from the 1980s (UK)
