= List of UK top-ten albums in 1986 =

The UK Albums Chart is one of many music charts compiled by the Official Charts Company that calculates the best-selling albums of the week in the United Kingdom. Before 2004, the chart was only based on the sales of physical albums. This list shows albums that peaked in the Top 10 of the UK Albums Chart during 1986, as well as albums which peaked in 1985 and 1987 but were in the top 10 in 1986. The entry date is when the album appeared in the top ten for the first time (week ending, as published by the Official Charts Company, which is six days after the chart is announced).

The first new number-one album of the year was the compilation album Hits 4. Overall, twelve different albums peaked at number-one in 1986.

== Top-ten albums ==
Key

Symbol	Meaning
‡	Album peaked in 1985 but still in chart in 1986.
♦	Album released in 1986 but peaked in 1987.
Entered	The date that the album first appeared in the chart.
Peak	Highest position that the album reached in the UK Albums Chart.

Entered (week ending)	Weeks in top 10	Single	Artist	Peak	Peak reached (week ending)	Weeks at peak
Albums in 1985
2 March 1985	36	No Jacket Required ‡	Phil Collins	1	2 March 1985	5
9 March 1985	30	Songs from the Big Chair ‡	Tears for Fears	2	9 March 1985	3
16 March 1985	30	Like a Virgin ‡	Madonna	1	21 September 1985	2
13 April 1985	10	Bangs & Crashes	Go West	8	8 March 1986	2
11 May 1985	21	Be Yourself Tonight ‡	Eurythmics	3	18 May 1985	5
25 May 1985	65	Brothers in Arms ‡	Dire Straits	1	25 May 1985	14
29 June 1985	9	The Dream of the Blue Turtles ‡	Sting	3	29 June 1985	1
29 June 1985	2	Little Creatures ‡	Talking Heads	10	29 June 1985	2
28 September 1985	11	Hounds of Love ‡	Kate Bush	1	28 September 1985	3
19 October 1985	12	The Love Songs ‡	George Benson	1	26 October 1985	2
26 October 1985	14	World Machine	Level 42	3	8 February 1986	2
2 November 1985	10	Once Upon a Time ‡	Simple Minds	1	2 November 1985	1
16 November 1985	10	Promise ‡	Sade	1	16 November 1985	2
16 November 1985	9	The Singles Collection ‡	Spandau Ballet	3	7 December 1985	1
23 November 1985	8	The Greatest Hits of 1985 ‡	Various artists	1	30 November 1985	1
30 November 1985	5	The Love Album: 16 Classic Love Songs ‡	Various artists	7	30 November 1985	1
30 November 1985	8	Now – The Christmas Album ‡	Various artists	1	21 December 1985	2
7 December 1985	8	Now That's What I Call Music! 6 ‡	Various artists	1	7 December 1985	4
7 December 1985	6	Hits 3 ‡	Various artists	2	7 December 1985	2
Albums in 1986
11 January 1986	7	Island Life	Grace Jones	4	15 February 1986	1
18 January 1986	18	Hunting High and Low	A-ha	2	18 January 1986	5
18 January 1986	8	The Broadway Album	Barbra Streisand	3	25 January 1986	2
18 January 1986	22	Whitney Houston	Whitney Houston	2	1 March 1986	3
15 February 1986	8	Rocky IV	Various artists	3	1 March 1986	1
15 February 1986	2	The Disco Hits Album	Various artists	10	15 February 1986	2
22 February 1986	1	The Ultimate Sin	Ozzy Osbourne	8	22 February 1986	1
1 March 1986	3	Jonathan King Presents The Very Best of Entertainment from the USA	Various artists	6	8 March 1986	1
1 March 1986	1	The Colour of Spring	Talk Talk	8	1 March 1986	1
8 March 1986	6	Hits For Lovers	Various artists	2	22 March 1986	1
22 March 1986	1	Night Beat II	Various artists	7	22 March 1986	1
22 March 1986	1	Balance of Power	Electric Light Orchestra	9	22 March 1986	1
22 March 1986	3	The Hymns Album	Huddersfield Choral Society	8	5 April 1986	1
29 March 1986	9	Hits 4	Various artists	1	29 March 1986	4
29 March 1986	1	Black Celebration	Depeche Mode	4	29 March 1986	1
29 March 1986	4	Welcome to the Real World	Mr. Mister	6	29 March 1986	2
5 April 1986	5	Please	Pet Shop Boys	3	5 April 1986	2
5 April 1986	2	Dirty Work	The Rolling Stones	4	5 April 1986	1
12 April 1986	2	Parade	Prince and The Revolution	4	12 April 1986	1
12 April 1986	1	From Luxury to Heartache	Culture Club	10	12 April 1986	1
26 April 1986	11	Street Life: 20 Great Hits	Bryan Ferry and Roxy Music	1	26 April 1986	5
26 April 1986	2	Heart to Heart: 24 Tender Romantic Duets	Various artists	8	26 April 1986	2
26 April 1986	4	The Greatest Hits	Shalamar	5	10 May 1986	1
26 April 1986	1	Victorialand	Cocteau Twins	10	26 April 1986	1
3 May 1986	4	The Man and His Music	Sam Cooke	8	14 June 1986	2
3 May 1986	2	Rendez-Vous	Jean-Michel Jarre	9	23 August 1986	1
10 May 1986	4	The Collection	Earth, Wind & Fire	5	17 May 1986	2
10 May 1986	2	Comic Relief Presents Utterly Utterly Live!	Various artists	10	10 May 1986	2
17 May 1986	5	Love Zone	Billy Ocean	2	17 May 1986	2
17 May 1986	1	Home and Abroad	The Style Council	8	17 May 1986	1
31 May 1986	10	So	Peter Gabriel	1	31 May 1986	2
31 May 1986	3	Standing on a Beach – The Singles	The Cure	4	31 May 1986	1
31 May 1986	19	Picture Book	Simply Red	2	7 June 1986	1
7 June 1986	10	Into the Light	Chris de Burgh	2	9 August 1986	2
14 June 1986	14	A Kind of Magic	Queen	1	14 June 1986	1
21 June 1986	18	Invisible Touch	Genesis	1	21 June 1986	3
21 June 1986	2	Moonlight Shadows	The Shadows	6	21 June 1986	1
28 June 1986	2	The Queen Is Dead	The Smiths	2	28 June 1986	1
5 July 1986	3	London 0 Hull 4	The Housemartins	3	5 July 1986	1
5 July 1986	5	Every Beat of My Heart	Rod Stewart	5	19 July 1986	1
12 July 1986	36	True Blue	Madonna	1	12 July 1986	6
12 July 1986	2	The Seer	Big Country	2	12 July 1986	1
12 July 1986	21	Revenge	Eurythmics	3	12 July 1986	4
12 July 1986	4	Back in the High Life	Steve Winwood	8	19 July 1986	2
19 July 1986	7	The Final	Wham!	2	19 July 1986	3
19 July 1986	2	Now – The Summer Album	Various artists	7	19 July 1986	2
2 August 1986	4	Riptide	Robert Palmer	5	16 August 1986	1
9 August 1986	2	Rat in the Kitchen	UB40	8	9 August 1986	1
9 August 1986	1	Flaunt It	Sigue Sigue Sputnik	10	9 August 1986	1
23 August 1986	9	Now That's What I Call Music! 7	Various artists	1	23 August 1986	5
23 August 1986	5	Dancing on the Ceiling	Lionel Richie	2	23 August 1986	3
30 August 1986	28	Silk & Steel	Five Star	1	27 September 1986	1
30 August 1986	3	The Heat is On	Various artists	9	30 August 1986	1
6 September 1986	1	In the Army Now	Status Quo	7	6 September 1986	1
13 September 1986	33	Graceland	Paul Simon	1	4 October 1986	8
13 September 1986	1	Press to Play	Paul McCartney	8	13 September 1986	1
20 September 1986	4	Break Every Rule	Tina Turner	2	20 September 1986	1
20 September 1986	1	Crash	The Human League	7	20 September 1986	1
20 September 1986	10	Slippery When Wet	Bon Jovi	6	29 November 1986	2
27 September 1986	2	True Stories	Talking Heads	7	27 September 1986	1
27 September 1986	3	Fore!	Huey Lewis and the News	8	27 September 1986	1
27 September 1986	4	Communards	The Communards	7	27 September 1986	1
4 October 1986	1	Talking with the Taxman About Poetry	Billy Bragg	8	4 October 1986	1
11 October 1986	2	Somewhere in Time	Iron Maiden	3	11 October 1986	1
11 October 1986	3	South Pacific	Kiri Te Kanawa, José Carreras, Sarah Vaughan and Mandy Patinkin	5	18 October 1986	1
11 October 1986	1	Brotherhood	New Order	9	11 October 1986	1
18 October 1986	4	Scoundrel Days	A-ha	2	18 October 1986	2
18 October 1986	1	Word Up!	Cameo	7	18 October 1986	1
25 October 1986	2	The Chart/The Chart '86	Various artists	6	25 October 1986	1
25 October 1986	1	U-Vox	Ultravox	9	25 October 1986	1
25 October 1986	1	One to One	Howard Jones	10	25 October 1986	1
1 November 1986	1	Between Two Fires	Paul Young	4	1 November 1986	1
1 November 1986	1	Liverpool	Frankie Goes to Hollywood	5	1 November 1986	1
1 November 1986	7	Top Gun	Various artists	4	15 November 1986	2
1 November 1986	2	Whiplash Smile	Billy Idol	8	8 November 1986	1
8 November 1986	11	Every Breath You Take: The Singles	The Police	1	8 November 1986	2
8 November 1986	4	Now Dance '86: The 12" Mixes	Various artists	2	15 November 1986	1
8 November 1986	4	Get Close ♦	The Pretenders	6	31 January 1987	1
15 November 1986	2	The Greatest Hits of 1986	Various artists	8	15 November 1986	1
15 November 1986	1	The Autobiography of Supertramp	Supertramp	9	15 November 1986	1
15 November 1986	1	Hit Mix '86	Various artists	10	15 November 1986	1
22 November 1986	8	Hits 5	Various artists	1	22 November 1986	2
22 November 1986	14	The Whole Story ♦	Kate Bush	1	17 January 1987	2
22 November 1986	1	Live 1975-85	Bruce Springsteen and the E Street Band	4	22 November 1986	1
29 November 1986	2	Through the Barricades	Spandau Ballet	7	29 November 1986	1
6 December 1986	9	Now That's What I Call Music! 8	Various artists	1	6 December 1986	6
13 December 1986	16	Live Magic ♦	Queen	3	24 January 1987	1

== See also ==
- 1986 in British music
- List of number-one albums from the 1980s (UK)
