= List of UK top-ten albums in 1984 =

The UK Albums Chart is one of many music charts compiled by the Official Charts Company that calculates the best-selling albums of the week in the United Kingdom. Before 2004, the chart was only based on the sales of physical albums. This list shows albums that peaked in the Top 10 of the UK Albums Chart during 1984, as well as albums which peaked in 1983 and 1985 but were in the top 10 in 1984. The entry date is when the album appeared in the top ten for the first time (week ending, as published by the Official Charts Company, which is six days after the chart is announced).

The first new number-one album of the year was Touch by Eurythmics. Overall, fourteen different albums peaked at number-one in 1984.

== Top-ten albums ==
Key

Symbol	Meaning
‡	Album peaked in 1983 but still in chart in 1984.
♦	Album released in 1984 but peaked in 1985.
Entered	The date that the album first appeared in the chart.
Peak	Highest position that the album reached in the UK Albums Chart.

Entered (week ending)	Weeks in top 10	Single	Artist	Peak	Peak reached (week ending)	Weeks at peak
Albums in 1983
19 February 1983	76	Thriller ‡	Michael Jackson	1	5 March 1983	9
30 July 1983	31	No Parlez ‡	Paul Young	1	17 September 1983	5
6 August 1983	14	The Crossing ‡	Big Country	3	24 September 1983	3
22 October 1983	17	Colour by Numbers ‡	Culture Club	1	22 October 1983	5
29 October 1983	49	Can't Slow Down ‡	Lionel Richie	1	12 November 1983	3
12 November 1983	7	Pipes of Peace ‡	Paul McCartney	4	12 November 1983	1
19 November 1983	33	An Innocent Man	Billy Joel	2	23 June 1984	1
26 November 1983	7	Stages ‡	Elaine Paige	2	10 December 1983	1
26 November 1983	11	Touch	Eurythmics	1	4 February 1984	2
3 December 1983	7	Under a Blood Red Sky ‡	U2	2	3 December 1983	1
10 December 1983	11	Now That's What I Call Music! ‡	Various artists	1	17 December 1983	5
17 December 1983	4	Chas'n'Dave's Knees Up Jamboree Bag No. 2 ‡	Chas & Dave	7	24 December 1983	2
Albums in 1984
7 January 1984	2	Green Velvet – Sixteen Ballads of Peace and Love	Various artists	6	7 January 1984	1
14 January 1984	3	Portrait – All Her Greatest Hits	Diana Ross	8	14 January 1984	1
28 January 1984	2	Milk and Honey	John Lennon and Yoko Ono	3	28 January 1984	1
4 February 1984	1	Slide It In	Whitesnake	9	4 February 1984	1
18 February 1984	5	Sparkle in the Rain	Simple Minds	1	18 February 1984	1
18 February 1984	2	Sometimes When We Touch	Various artists	8	18 February 1984	1
18 February 1984	2	The Very Best of Motown Love Songs	Various artists	10	18 February 1984	2
25 February 1984	15	Into the Gap	Thompson Twins	1	25 February 1984	3
25 February 1984	1	Declaration	The Alarm	6	25 February 1984	1
3 March 1984	4	The Smiths	The Smiths	2	3 March 1984	1
3 March 1984	2	Keep Moving	Madness	6	3 March 1984	1
10 March 1984	25	The Works	Queen	2	10 March 1984	2
10 March 1984	7	Human Racing	Nik Kershaw	5	14 July 1984	1
17 March 1984	12	Human's Lib	Howard Jones	1	17 March 1984	2
24 March 1984	4	Café Bleu	The Style Council	2	24 March 1984	1
24 March 1984	7	Alchemy: Dire Straits Live	Dire Straits	3	24 March 1984	2
24 March 1984	2	Fugazi	Marillion	5	24 March 1984	1
7 April 1984	12	Now That's What I Call Music! II	Various artists	1	14 April 1984	5
14 April 1984	2	Lament	Ultravox	8	14 April 1984	1
21 April 1984	1	Off the Wall	Michael Jackson	10	21 April 1984	1
28 April 1984	2	Grace Under Pressure	Rush	5	28 April 1984	1
28 April 1984	3	And I Love You So	Howard Keel	6	5 May 1984	2
5 May 1984	6	Footloose: Original Soundtrack of the Paramount Motion Picture	Various artists	7	5 May 1984	4
12 May 1984	2	Ocean Rain	Echo & the Bunnymen	4	12 May 1984	1
12 May 1984	1	Junk Culture	Orchestral Manoeuvres in the Dark	9	12 May 1984	1
12 May 1984	1	The Top	The Cure	10	12 May 1984	1
19 May 1984	20	Legend	Bob Marley and the Wailers	1	19 May 1984	12
19 May 1984	2	Hysteria	The Human League	3	19 May 1984	1
26 May 1984	2	Mange Tout	Blancmange	8	26 May 1984	1
2 June 1984	3	Hungry For Hits: 30 Killer Cuts	Various artists	4	9 June 1984	1
2 June 1984	4	Then Came Rock 'n' Roll: 36 Original Rock 'n' Roll Classics	Various artists	5	23 June 1984	1
16 June 1984	35	Born in the U.S.A. ♦	Bruce Springsteen	1	16 February 1985	5
23 June 1984	4	American Heartbeat	Various artists	4	30 June 1984	1
23 June 1984	2	Camouflage	Rod Stewart	8	23 June 1984	1
23 June 1984	2	Farewell My Summer Love	Michael Jackson	9	23 June 1984	2
30 June 1984	5	Breaking Hearts	Elton John	2	30 June 1984	1
30 June 1984	5	Breakdance: Original Soundtrack	Various artists	6	30 June 1984	1
7 July 1984	10	Parade	Spandau Ballet	2	7 July 1984	3
7 July 1984	1	Brilliant Trees	David Sylvian	4	7 July 1984	1
7 July 1984	1	Goodbye Cruel World	Elvis Costello and The Attractions	10	7 July 1984	1
14 July 1984	5	Break Out	The Pointer Sisters	9	14 July 1984	3
21 July 1984	2	Victory	The Jacksons	3	21 July 1984	1
21 July 1984	2	The Last in Line	Dio	4	21 July 1984	1
21 July 1984	17	Private Dancer	Tina Turner	2	1 September 1984	2
28 July 1984	30	Diamond Life	Sade	2	28 July 1984	5
28 July 1984	1	Primitive	Neil Diamond	7	28 July 1984	1
11 August 1984	13	Now That's What I Call Music! 3	Various artists	1	11 August 1984	8
25 August 1984	2	Phil Fearon and Galaxy	Phil Fearon and Galaxy	8	1 September 1984	1
15 September 1984	3	Powerslave	Iron Maiden	2	15 September 1984	1
15 September 1984	22	Eliminator ♦	ZZ Top	3	26 January 1985	1
15 September 1984	6	Purple Rain ♦	Prince and The Revolution	7	16 March 1985	1
22 September 1984	6	The Woman in Red: Original Motion Picture Soundtrack	Stevie Wonder and Dionne Warwick	2	22 September 1984	3
6 October 1984	3	Tonight	David Bowie	1	6 October 1984	1
6 October 1984	2	Some Great Reward	Depeche Mode	5	6 October 1984	1
6 October 1984	2	We Are Family	Sister Sledge	7	6 October 1984	2
13 October 1984	8	The Unforgettable Fire	U2	1	13 October 1984	2
20 October 1984	2	Geffery Morgan	UB40	3	20 October 1984	1
20 October 1984	9	The Age of Consent	Bronski Beat	4	20 October 1984	2
20 October 1984	2	Hits, Hits, Hits: 18 Smash Originals	Various artists	6	20 October 1984	2
20 October 1984	2	All By Myself: 28 Tender Love Songs	Various artists	7	27 October 1984	1
27 October 1984	3	Steeltown	Big Country	1	27 October 1984	1
3 November 1984	5	Give My Regards to Broad Street	Paul McCartney	1	3 November 1984	1
3 November 1984	2	Waking Up with the House on Fire	Culture Club	2	3 November 1984	1
3 November 1984	1	Miss Randy Crawford – The Greatest Hits	Randy Crawford	10	3 November 1984	1
10 November 1984	14	Welcome to the Pleasuredome	Frankie Goes to Hollywood	1	10 November 1984	1
10 November 1984	13	The Collection	Ultravox	2	10 November 1984	3
10 November 1984	2	Perfect Strangers	Deep Purple	5	10 November 1984	1
10 November 1984	2	Bad Attitude	Meat Loaf	8	10 November 1984	1
17 November 1984	16	Make It Big	Wham!	1	17 November 1984	2
17 November 1984	25	Alf ♦	Alison Moyet	1	19 January 1985	1
17 November 1984	1	Real to Reel	Marillion	8	17 November 1984	1
24 November 1984	6	Arena	Duran Duran	6	24 November 1984	1
24 November 1984	1	Hatful of Hollow	The Smiths	7	24 November 1984	1
24 November 1984	7	Greatest Hits	Shakin' Stevens	8	8 December 1984	4
1 December 1984	9	The Hits Album	Various artists	1	1 December 1984	7
1 December 1984	1	The Riddle	Nik Kershaw	8	1 December 1984	1
8 December 1984	8	Now That's What I Call Music! 4	Various artists	2	8 December 1984	6
15 December 1984	5	Party Party – 16 Great Party Icebreakers	Black Lace	4	22 December 1984	2
22 December 1984	1	Yesterday Once More – 26 Carpenters Classics	The Carpenters	10	22 December 1984	1

== See also ==
- 1984 in British music
- List of number-one albums from the 1980s (UK)
