= 1985 in British music =

This is a summary of 1985 in music in the United Kingdom, including the official charts from that year.

== Summary ==
The biggest British musical event of 1985 was the Live Aid concert in London's Wembley Stadium on 13 July. Held to follow up the previous year's charity record "Do They Know It's Christmas?", the biggest-selling single ever at the time, popular acts such as The Who, U2 and Queen performed in front of an estimated audience of 1.9 billion viewers. It raised £150 million to help famine in Ethiopia, and a similar event would happen 20 years later in 2005, with Live 8.

After the huge success of Band Aid's "Do They Know It's Christmas?", several more charity songs reached number 1 this year. USA for Africa, inspired by Band Aid, released "We Are the World", a song written by Michael Jackson and Lionel Richie, while David Bowie and Mick Jagger released a cover of "Dancing in the Street", the music video being premiered at Live Aid and all proceeds going to the charity. In May, a fire at a football stadium in Bradford killed 56 people, and supergroup The Crowd released a charity cover of popular football anthem "You'll Never Walk Alone" in tribute.

British rock band Dire Straits released their album Brothers in Arms in May, one of the first ever albums to be released on compact disc and the format's first million-seller. It went on to become the UK's best-selling album of the entire decade and remains one of the top ten best-selling albums of all time in the UK. Four singles were released from the album, including the UK number 4 hit and US number 1 "Money for Nothing", which referenced American music channel MTV and had a groundbreaking video featuring early computer-generated imagery. When a European version of MTV launched in 1987, it was the first video ever played on the channel.

Jennifer Rush entered the top 75 in June with the power ballad "The Power of Love", which remained in the chart for months without entering the top 40. When it finally did in September, it quickly hit number 1, where it remained for five weeks and was the biggest selling single of the year. It sold over a million copies, however it would be the last single of the decade to do so, and there would not be another million-seller until 1991.

Many songs this year competed for the Christmas number one single, and the entire top 3 from 1984 re-entered the chart this year; Paul McCartney's "We All Stand Together" at number 32, Wham!'s "Last Christmas" at number 6, and Band Aid's "Do They Know It's Christmas?" at number 3. There were also attempts from Bruce Springsteen with a cover of "Santa Claus Is Coming to Town", and ventriloquist Keith Harris released a cover of "White Christmas" with his green puppet Orville the Duck.

However, the Christmas number one went to Shakin' Stevens with the song "Merry Christmas Everyone". It had been intended to be released in 1984, but was kept back a year due to the Band Aid charity single. Still a widely known Christmas song in the 21st century, it re-entered the chart in Christmas 2007 on downloads alone, at number 22.

John Rutter, hitherto best known for his popular modern carols, acknowledged his classical roots with his Requiem, which was premièred in October in Sacramento, California. Less than eight months earlier, Andrew Lloyd Webber's Requiem had its première in New York. Paul Miles-Kingston, the boy soprano who won a silver disc for his recording of the "Pie Jesu" from that work, became Head Chorister of Winchester Cathedral in the same year. The prolific Peter Maxwell Davies (who had moved to Orkney in 1971) produced one of his most popular works, An Orkney Wedding, with Sunrise, notable for featuring the bagpipes as a lead instrument, as well as the Symphony No 3, which like its predecessors shows the influence of Sibelius. Veteran Welsh composer Daniel Jones, produced his 12th symphony, at the age of 73, whilst 80-year-old Michael Tippett began work on his last opera, New Year.

== Events ==
- 19 February – The first performance of Peter Maxwell Davies' Symphony No 3 takes place at Manchester's Free Trade Hall, by the BBC Philharmonic Orchestra, Edward Downes conducting.
- 24 February – The first performance of Andrew Lloyd Webber's Requiem takes place in St Thomas Church, Manhattan, conducted by Lorin Maazel, with soloists Plácido Domingo, Sarah Brightman and Paul Miles-Kingston.
- 10 March – An Orkney Wedding, with Sunrise by Peter Maxwell Davies is premiered in Boston by the Boston Symphony Orchestra.
- 14 March – Movements 1, 2, 4 and 7 of John Rutter's Requiem receive their first performance in Sacramento, California, conducted by the composer.
- 15 March – Jesus & Mary Chain perform a gig at North London Polytechnic which lasts less than 20 minutes after they appear late on stage. A riot ensues, resulting in audience members storming the stage and smashing up the band's equipment, causing £8000 worth of damage.
- 15 March – Song Offerings for soprano and eight players by Jonathan Harvey is performed for the first time at the Queen Elizabeth Hall.
- 2 May – The last surviving member of the family of Savoy opera directors, Dame Bridget D'Oyly Carte, dies of cancer at the age of 77.
- 13 July – The benefit concert Live Aid is held at London's Wembley Stadium and Philadelphia's John F. Kennedy Stadium. 72,000 people attend at Wembley and the event raises over £150 million in aid of famine relief.
- 7 September – The first performance of Robin Holloway's Viola Concerto takes place at the Proms, with soloist Rivka Golani and the BBC Scottish Symphony Orchestra, conductor Vernon Handley.
- 26 September – The Symphony No 12 by Daniel Jones is premiered at St David's Hall, Cardiff by the BBC Welsh Symphony Orchestra, conducted by Erich Begal.
- 13 October – The first complete performance of John Rutter's Requiem takes place in Dallas, Texas, conducted by the composer.

== Charts ==
=== Number one singles ===
Chart date (week ending)	Song	Artist(s)	Weeks	Sales
5 January	"Do They Know It's Christmas?"	Band Aid	2	170,306
12 January	"Do They Know It's Christmas?"	Band Aid	2	92,769
19 January	"I Want to Know What Love Is"	Foreigner	3	73,882
26 January	"I Want to Know What Love Is"	Foreigner	3	119,901
2 February	"I Want to Know What Love Is"	Foreigner	3	105,383
9 February	"I Know Him So Well"	Elaine Paige and Barbara Dickson	4	101,728
16 February	"I Know Him So Well"	Elaine Paige and Barbara Dickson	4	112,285
23 February	"I Know Him So Well"	Elaine Paige and Barbara Dickson	4	108,494
2 March	"I Know Him So Well"	Elaine Paige and Barbara Dickson	4	78,693
9 March	"You Spin Me Round (Like a Record)"	Dead or Alive	2	86,802
16 March	"You Spin Me Round (Like a Record)"	Dead or Alive	2	85,918
23 March	"Easy Lover"	Philip Bailey and Phil Collins	4	85,442
30 March	"Easy Lover"	Philip Bailey and Phil Collins	4	98,651
6 April	"Easy Lover"	Philip Bailey and Phil Collins	4	77,979
13 April	"Easy Lover"	Philip Bailey and Phil Collins	4	60,724
20 April	"We Are the World"	USA for Africa	2	58,582
27 April	"We Are the World"	USA for Africa	2	80,767
4 May	"Move Closer"	Phyllis Nelson	1	85,102
11 May	"19"	Paul Hardcastle	5	141,950
18 May	"19"	Paul Hardcastle	5	135,558
25 May	"19"	Paul Hardcastle	5	92,327
1 June	"19"	Paul Hardcastle	5	84,014
8 June	"19"	Paul Hardcastle	5	60,129
15 June	"You'll Never Walk Alone"	The Crowd	2	85,816
22 June	"You'll Never Walk Alone"	The Crowd	2	134,538
29 June	"Frankie"	Sister Sledge	4	93,007
6 July	"Frankie"	Sister Sledge	4	109,854
13 July	"Frankie"	Sister Sledge	4	78,863
20 July	"Frankie"	Sister Sledge	4	62,628
27 July	"There Must Be an Angel (Playing with My Heart)"	Eurythmics	1	90,933
3 August	"Into the Groove"	Madonna	4	112,846
10 August	"Into the Groove"	Madonna	4	139,060
17 August	"Into the Groove"	Madonna	4	111,792
24 August	"Into the Groove"	Madonna	4	84,371
31 August	"I Got You Babe"	UB40 and Chrissie Hynde	1	78,795
7 September	"Dancing in the Street"	David Bowie and Mick Jagger	4	103,428
14 September	"Dancing in the Street"	David Bowie and Mick Jagger	4	163,557
21 September	"Dancing in the Street"	David Bowie and Mick Jagger	4	105,179
28 September	"Dancing in the Street"	David Bowie and Mick Jagger	4	72,658
5 October	"If I Was"	Midge Ure	1	62,441
12 October	"The Power of Love"	Jennifer Rush	5	120,513
19 October	"The Power of Love"	Jennifer Rush	5	184,382
26 October	"The Power of Love"	Jennifer Rush	5	161,942
2 November	"The Power of Love"	Jennifer Rush	5	133,484
9 November	"The Power of Love"	Jennifer Rush	5	103,343
16 November	"A Good Heart"	Feargal Sharkey	2	86,139
23 November	"A Good Heart"	Feargal Sharkey	2	115,923
30 November	"I'm Your Man"	Wham!	2	100,895
7 December	"I'm Your Man"	Wham!	2	90,219
14 December	"Saving All My Love for You"	Whitney Houston	2	80,325
21 December	"Saving All My Love for You"	Whitney Houston	2	109,157
28 December	"Merry Christmas Everyone"	Shakin' Stevens	1	186,949

=== Number one albums ===
Chart date (week ending)	Album	Artist(s)	Weeks
5 January	Hits 1	Various Artists	2
12 January	Hits 1	Various Artists	2
19 January	Alf	Alison Moyet	1
26 January	Agent Provocateur	Foreigner	3
2 February	Agent Provocateur	Foreigner	3
9 February	Agent Provocateur	Foreigner	3
16 February	Born in the U.S.A.	Bruce Springsteen	1
23 February	Meat Is Murder	The Smiths	1
2 March	No Jacket Required	Phil Collins	5
9 March	No Jacket Required	Phil Collins	5
16 March	No Jacket Required	Phil Collins	5
23 March	No Jacket Required	Phil Collins	5
30 March	No Jacket Required	Phil Collins	5
6 April	The Secret of Association	Paul Young	1
13 April	Hits 2	Various Artists	6
20 April	Hits 2	Various Artists	6
27 April	Hits 2	Various Artists	6
4 May	Hits 2	Various Artists	6
11 May	Hits 2	Various Artists	6
18 May	Hits 2	Various Artists	6
25 May	Brothers in Arms	Dire Straits	2
1 June	Brothers in Arms	Dire Straits	2
8 June	Our Favourite Shop	The Style Council	1
15 June	Boys and Girls	Bryan Ferry	2
22 June	Boys and Girls	Bryan Ferry	2
29 June	Misplaced Childhood	Marillion	1
6 July	Born in the U.S.A.	Bruce Springsteen	4
13 July	Born in the U.S.A.	Bruce Springsteen	4
20 July	Born in the U.S.A.	Bruce Springsteen	4
27 July	Born in the U.S.A.	Bruce Springsteen	4
3 August	Brothers in Arms	Dire Straits	2
10 August	Brothers in Arms	Dire Straits	2
17 August	Now 5	Various Artists	5
24 August	Now 5	Various Artists	5
31 August	Now 5	Various Artists	5
7 September	Now 5	Various Artists	5
14 September	Now 5	Various Artists	5
21 September	Like a Virgin	Madonna	1
28 September	Hounds of Love	Kate Bush	2
5 October	Hounds of Love	Kate Bush	2
12 October	Like a Virgin	Madonna	1
19 October	Hounds of Love	Kate Bush	1
26 October	The Love Songs	George Benson	1
2 November	Once Upon a Time	Simple Minds	1
10 November	The Love Songs	George Benson	1
16 November	Promise	Sade	2
23 November	Promise	Sade	2
30 November	The Greatest Hits of 1985	Various Artists	1
7 December	Now 6	Various Artists	2
14 December	Now 6	Various Artists	2
21 December	Now – The Christmas Album	Various Artists	2
28 December	Now – The Christmas Album	Various Artists	2

== Year-end charts ==
=== Best-selling singles ===
Based on sales from 5 January to 28 December 1985.

No.	Title	Artist	Peak position
1	"The Power of Love"	Jennifer Rush	1
2	"I Know Him So Well"	Elaine Paige and Barbara Dickson	1
3	"Into the Groove"	Madonna	1
4	"19"	Paul Hardcastle	1
5	"Frankie"	Sister Sledge	1
6	"Dancing in the Street"	David Bowie and Mick Jagger	1
7	"Move Closer"	Phyllis Nelson	1
8	"A Good Heart"	Feargal Sharkey	1
9	"Take On Me"	a-ha	2
10	"Love & Pride"	King	2
11	"I Want to Know What Love Is"	Foreigner	1
12	"Easy Lover"	Philip Bailey and Phil Collins	1
13	"Axel F"	Harold Faltermeyer	2
14	"Do They Know It's Christmas?"	Band Aid	1
15	"I Got You Babe"	UB40 and Chrissie Hynde	1
16	"Crazy for You"	Madonna	2
17	"Saving All My Love for You"	Whitney Houston	1
18	"Solid"	Ashford & Simpson	3
19	"You Spin Me Round (Like a Record)"	Dead or Alive	1
20	"There Must Be an Angel (Playing with My Heart)"	Eurythmics	1
21	"I'm Your Man"	Wham!	1
22	"Trapped"	Colonel Abrams	3
23	"Cherish"	Kool & the Gang	4
24	"Everybody Wants to Rule the World"	Tears for Fears	2
25	"Merry Christmas Everyone"	Shakin' Stevens	1
26	"You'll Never Walk Alone"	The Crowd	1
27	"If I Was"	Midge Ure	1
28	"Nikita"	Elton John	3
29	"Dancing in the Dark"	Bruce Springsteen	4
30	"1999"/"Little Red Corvette"	Prince	2
31	"Holding Out for a Hero"	Bonnie Tyler	2
32	"Kayleigh"	Marillion	2
33	"Last Christmas"/"Everything She Wants" (Remix)	Wham!	2
34	"A View to a Kill"	Duran Duran	2
35	"We Are the World"	USA for Africa	1
36	"Lean On Me (Ah-Li-Ayo)"	Red Box	3
37	"Part-Time Lover"	Stevie Wonder	3
38	"Money for Nothing"	Dire Straits	4
39	"Don't Break My Heart"	UB40	3
40	"We Close Our Eyes"	Go West	5
41	"Nightshift"	The Commodores	3
42	"That Ole Devil Called Love"	Alison Moyet	2
43	"We Don't Need Another Hero"	Tina Turner	3
44	"Tarzan Boy"	Baltimora	3
45	"See the Day"	Dee C. Lee	3
46	"Kiss Me"	Stephen 'Tin Tin' Duffy	4
47	"I Feel Love (Medley)"	Bronski Beat and Marc Almond	3
48	"Welcome to the Pleasuredome"	Frankie Goes to Hollywood	2
49	"Suddenly"	Billy Ocean	4
50	"Shout"	Tears for Fears	4

=== Best-selling albums ===
Based on sales from 5 January to 28 December 1985.

No.	Title	Artist	Peak position
1	Brothers in Arms	Dire Straits	1
2	No Jacket Required	Phil Collins	1
3	Like a Virgin	Madonna	1
4	Born in the U.S.A.	Bruce Springsteen	1
5	Songs from the Big Chair	Tears for Fears	2
6	Now 6	Various Artists	1
7	Now – The Christmas Album	Various Artists	1
8	Now 5	Various Artists	1
9	Hits 2	Various Artists	1
10	The Secret of Association	Paul Young	1
11	Alf	Alison Moyet	1
12	Hits 3	Various Artists	2
13	Love Songs	George Benson	1
14	Hounds of Love	Kate Bush	1
15	Be Yourself Tonight	Eurythmics	3
16	Private Dancer	Tina Turner	6
17	Promise	Sade	1
18	Make It Big	Wham!	3 (Note: Reached number 1 in 1984)
19	Diamond Life	Sade	4 (Note: Reached number 2 in 1984)
20	Misplaced Childhood	Marillion	1
21	Eliminator	ZZ Top	3
22	The Singles Collection	Spandau Ballet	3
23	Boys and Girls	Bryan Ferry	1
24	Go West	Go West	9 (Note: Reached number 8 in 1986)
25	Agent Provocateur	Foreigner	1
26	Reckless	Bryan Adams	7
27	The Kenny Rogers Story	Kenny Rogers	4
28	Greatest Hits Volume I & Volume II	Billy Joel	7
29	The Greatest Hits of 1985	Various Artists	1
30	The Unforgettable Fire	U2	9 (Note: Reached number 1 in 1984)
31	Out Now	Various Artists	2
32	Hits Out of Hell	Meat Loaf	2
33	Welcome to the Pleasuredome	Frankie Goes to Hollywood	5 (Note: Reached number 1 in 1984)
34	The Age of Consent	Bronski Beat	5 (Note: Reached number 4 in 1984)
35	Under a Blood Red Sky	U2	11 (Note: Reached number 2 in 1983)
36	Once Upon a Time	Simple Minds	1
37	The Dream of the Blue Turtles	Sting	3
38	Madonna – The First Album	Madonna	6
39	Dream into Action	Howard Jones	2
40	The Love Album	Various Artists	7
41	The Collection	Ultravox	2
42	The Hits Album	Various Artists	1
43	Greatest Hits	Queen	14 (Note: Reached number 1 in 1981)
44	Voices from the Holy Land	BBC Welsh Chorus with Aled Jones	6
45	Ice on Fire	Elton John	3
46	All Through the Night	Aled Jones	2
47	Now 4	Various Artists	2
48	Requiem	Various Artists	4
49	Love Hurts	Elaine Paige	8
50	Face Value	Phil Collins	22 (Note: Reached number 1 in 1981)

== Classical music: new works ==
- Peter Maxwell Davies – An Orkney Wedding, with Sunrise
- Andrew Lloyd Webber – Requiem
- Elizabeth Maconchy – String Quartet No. 13, Quartetto corto
- John Rutter – Requiem

== Film and Incidental music ==
- Michael Nyman – A Zed and Two Noughts directed by Peter Greenaway.

== Musical films ==
- Billy the Kid and the Green Baize Vampire, with Phil Daniels

== Births ==
- 6 January – Ben Haenow, singer
- 11 January – Newton Faulkner, singer
- 2 March – Luke Pritchard, singer (The Kooks)
- 4 February – Bashy, recording artist and actor
- 3 April – Leona Lewis, singer
- 2 May – Lily Allen, singer, songwriter
- 4 May – Jme, grime MC
- 21 May
  - Kano, rapper, songwriter
  - Mutya Buena, singer and former member of (Sugababes)
- 7 June – Charlie Simpson, singer and musician (Busted, Fightstar)
- 8 June – Jamie Shaw, singer (One True Voice)
- 15 June – Nadine Coyle, singer (Girls Aloud)
- 27 June – Glenn Ball, singer (Pop!)
- 5 July – Nick O'Malley, musician (Arctic Monkeys)
- 8 July – Jamie Cook, musician (Arctic Monkeys)
- 17 July – Tom Fletcher, singer (McFly)
- 23 July – Matthew Murphy, musician (The Wombats)
- 10 September – Matt Johnson, singer (One True Voice)
- 28 September – Hannah Lewis, singer (Pop!)
- 5 October – Nicola Roberts, singer (Girls Aloud)
- 9 October – Frankmusik, singer-songwriter, record producer, musician, remixer
- 10 October – Marina Diamandis, singer-songwriter (Marina and the Diamonds)
- 1 November – Dizzee Rascal, rapper
- 19 December – Lady Sovereign, singer, musician
- 23 December – Harry Judd, drummer (McFly)
- 25 December – Leon Pisani, singer (V)

== Deaths ==
- 11 January – Kenny Clare, jazz drummer, 55
- 6 February – Neil McCarthy, actor and pianist, 62 (motor neurone disease)
- 7 February – Matt Monro, singer, 54
- 27 February
  - J. Pat O'Malley, singer and film actor, 86
  - Ray Ellington, singer, 68
- 28 February – David Byron, singer (Uriah Heep), 38 (alcohol-related)
- 15 March – Alan A. Freeman, record producer, 64
- 19 April – Ivan Menzies, operatic baritone, 88
- 2 May – Dame Bridget D'Oyly Carte, manager of the D'Oyly Carte Opera Company, 77
- 9 May – Reginald Dixon, theatre organist, 80
- 2 July – Hector Nicol, actor and singer, 64
- 30 July – Peter Knight, conductor, arranger and composer, 68
- 11 September – William Alwyn, composer, 79
- 25 October – Gary Holton, singer-songwriter, musician and actor, 33 (alcohol and drug overdose)
- 18 December – Jolyon Jackson, musician and composer, 37 (Hodgkins' disease)
- 12 December – Ian Stewart, musician, founding member and road manager for (The Rolling Stones), 47 (heart attack)
- 30 December – Bob Pearson, singer and pianist with his brother Alf (half of Bob and Alf Pearson), 78

== Music awards ==
=== Brit Awards ===
The 1985 Brit Awards winners were:

- Best British comedy recording: Neil (also known as Nigel Planer) – "Hole In My Shoe"
- Best British producer: Trevor Horn
- Best classical recording: Antonio Vivaldi's – "The Four Seasons"
- Best international artist: Prince and the Revolution
- Best soundtrack: "Purple Rain"
- British album: Sade – "Diamond Life"
- British female solo artist: Alison Moyet
- British group: Wham!
- British male solo artist: Paul Young
- British single: Frankie Goes to Hollywood – "Relax"
- British Video: Duran Duran – "The Wild Boys"
- Outstanding contribution: The Police
- Special Award: Bob Geldof and Midge Ure

== See also ==
- 1985 in British radio
- 1985 in British television
- 1985 in the United Kingdom
- List of British films of 1985
