= Smash Hits =

British music magazine (1978–2006)

- A 1988 cover of Smash Hits featuring Australian pop singers Kylie Minogue and Jason Donovan.
- Categories: A4-size music magazine
- Frequency: Initially monthly, then fortnightly
- First issue: September 1978; 48 years ago; July 2009; 17 years ago (one-off specials)
- Final issue: 13 February 2006; 20 years ago (final regular issue); April 2022; 4 years ago (final one-off special)
- Company: EMAP Metro (original); Bauer Media Group (one-off specials)
- Country: United Kingdom
- Language: English
- ISSN: 0260-3004

Smash Hits was a British music magazine aimed at young adults, originally published by EMAP. It ran from 1978 to 2006, and, after initially appearing monthly, was issued fortnightly during most of that time. The name survived as a brand for a spin-off digital television channel, which was later renamed Box Hits, and website. A digital radio station was also available but closed on 5 August 2013.

== Overview ==
First issue (September 1978)

Smash Hits featured the lyrics of latest hits and interviews with big names in music. It was initially published monthly, then went fortnightly. The style of the magazine was initially serious, but from the mid-1980s became increasingly irreverent. Its interviewing technique was novel at the time and, rather than looking up to the big names, it often made fun of them, asking strange questions rather than talking about their music.

Created by journalist Nick Logan, the title was launched in 1978 and appeared monthly for its first few issues. He based the idea on a songwords magazine that his sister used to buy, but which was of poor quality. His idea was to launch a glossy-looking magazine which also contained songwords as its mainstay. The publisher was EMAP, a small-time company based in Peterborough, and the magazine was originally titled Disco Fever, before they settled on the name Smash Hits.

Smash Hits launched the careers of many journalists, including Radio Times editor Mark Frith. Other well-known writers have included Sylvia Patterson, Dave Rimmer, Mark Ellen (who went on to launch Q, Mojo and Word), Steve Beebee, Chris Heath, Tom Hibbert and Miranda Sawyer. Neil Tennant of the Pet Shop Boys also worked as a writer and assistant editor, and once said that had he not become a pop star, he would likely have pursued his ambition to become editor.

The magazine was also available in continental Europe, especially in Germany, where the issues could be bought at railway stations or airports. The title was licensed for a French version in the 1990s. There were other licensed versions in the magazine's history. In 1984, an Australian version was created and proved just as successful for that new market as the original had back in Britain, whilst in the United States, a version was published during the 1980s under the title Star Hits, drawing articles from the British version.

It was published by EMAP, who also used the name for one of their digital television services, and for a digital radio station. The brand also covered the annual Smash Hits Poll Winners Party, an awards ceremony voted for by readers of the magazine.

The magazine's sales peaked during the late 1980s. In the early part of the decade it was regularly selling 500,000 copies per issue, which had risen to over one million by 1989. Sales began to drop during the 1990s and by 1996 it was reported that sales were dropping roughly 100,000 per year. By the time of its demise, it was down to 120,000.

== Final years of publishing ==
In the 1990s, the magazine's circulation slumped and it was overtaken by the BBC's spin-off magazine Top of the Pops. EMAP's other biweekly teen magazine of the period Big! (which featured more celebrities and stars of TV series including Australian show Home and Away and United States import Beverly Hills, 90210) was closed and this celebrity focus was shifted over to Smash Hits, which became less focused on teen pop and more of an entertainment magazine. The magazine also shifted size a number of times in subsequent relaunches, including one format that was as big as an album with songwords to be clipped out on the card cover. Television presenter and journalist Kate Thornton was editor for a short time.

In February 2006, it was announced that the magazine would cease publication after the February 13 edition due to declining sales.

In July 2009, a one-off commemorative issue of the magazine was published as a tribute to singer Michael Jackson. Further one-off specials were released in November 2009 (Take That), December 2010 (Lady Gaga) and November 2019 (Max Martin), the latter was a free magazine at certain London Underground stations to mark the debut of Martin's West End musical & Juliet. In April 2022, another free special issue was released to promote the third series of Derry Girls.

== Editors ==
1978: "Chris Hall" (pseudonym of Nick Logan, who refused to use his name as editor, instead inventing the name from those of his children, Christian and Hallie)
1979: Ian Cranna
1981: David Hepworth
1983: Mark Ellen
1985: Steve Bush
1986: Barry McIlheney
1989: Richard Lowe
1990: Mike Soutar
1994: Mark Frith
1996: Kate Thornton
1997: Gavin Reeve
1999: John McKie
2001: Emma Jones
2002: Lisa Smosarski
2005: Lara Palamoudian

== Compilation albums ==
EMAP licensed the brand for a number of compilation albums, including a tie-in with the Now That's What I Call Music brand for Now Smash Hits, a retrospective of the early 1980s (80–87).

== Australian edition ==
The Australian edition of Smash Hits magazine began in November 1984 as a fortnightly. The magazine blended some content from the parent publication with locally-generated material. Australian Smash Hits was originally published by Fairfax Magazines and was later purchased by Mason Stewart Publications. Over the years it became a monthly and then a bi-monthly. In 2007 the magazine retailed for A$5.95 Inc. GST and NZ$6.50. On 30 March 2007 it was announced that the Australian edition would cease publication due to low readership. The editor at that time was Emma Bradshaw. The issue that was scheduled to be released on 9 May 2007 was cancelled.

== See also ==
- Smash Hits (TV channel)
- The Hits
- Number One
