= Now Smash Hits =

Now That's What I Call Music Smash Hits

Compilation album by Various Artists
- Released: 3 October 1987
- Recorded: 1975, 1980, 1981, 1982, 1983, 1984, 1985, 1986, 1987
- Genre: Pop
- Label: EMI / Virgin / PolyGram

Now That's What I Call Music Smash Hits is a compilation album released on 3 October 1987. The album is part of the (UK) Now That's What I Call Music! series and is a collaboration with Smash Hits magazine, a successful pop music-based magazine at the time. It was conceived, written, and designed by the Smash Hits staff, and the liner notes are presented in the magazine's offbeat style.

The album features popular UK Singles Chart hits from 1980 to 1987, in rough reverse chronological order, starting with more recent songs (four songs for each year) and ending with older ones. Many of the older songs had not been featured on any Now albums before, as the series did not start until 1983

A companion issue of the magazine was released at the same time, featuring pictures and lyrics to all the songs on the album.

The front cover of the vinyl and audio cassette releases feature the words 32 Swingorilliant Hits of the 80's. For the compact disc release the number was changed to 31, as Michael Jackson's "One Day in Your Life" is missing from the CD version. A VHS tape was also released featuring 26 music videos of songs from the compilation.

Neil Tennant, who features on side 1 of the album as part of Pet Shop Boys, worked as assistant editor of Smash Hits magazine in the early 1980s.

Smash Hits went on to release their own various artists compilation albums. This is the first album in the UK Now! series with a 1980s theme. Another 3-disc compilation called Now That's What I Call the 80s was released in 2007.

Smash Hits is available on Apple Music as a playlist.

== Track listing ==
=== CD/record/tape 1 (1987–1984) ===
#	Title	Artist	Year released	Genre
1	Down to Earth	Curiosity Killed the Cat	1986	Sophisti-pop
2	If You Let Me Stay	Terence Trent D'Arby	1987	R&B
3	Respectable	Mel and Kim	1987	Dance-pop
4	Labour of Love	Hue and Cry	1987	Sophisti-pop
5	Rain or Shine	Five Star	1986	Pop
6	West End Girls	Pet Shop Boys	1984	Synth-pop
7	Happy Hour	The Housemartins	1986	Indie rock
8	Holding Back the Years	Simply Red	1985	Sophisti-pop
9	Take on Me	a-ha	1984	Synth-pop
10	You Spin Me Round (Like a Record)	Dead or Alive	1984	Synth-pop
11	There Must Be an Angel (Playing with My Heart)	Eurythmics	1985	Pop
12	Everybody Wants to Rule the World	Tears for Fears	1985	Synth-pop
13	Wake Me Up Before You Go-Go	Wham!	1984	Bubblegum pop
14	Smalltown Boy	Bronski Beat	1984	Synth-pop
15	Master and Servant	Depeche Mode	1984	Synth-pop
16	Careless Whisper	George Michael	1984	Pop

=== CD/record/tape 2 (1983–1980) ===
#	Title	Artist	Year released	Genre
1	True	Spandau Ballet	1983	
2	Red Red Wine	UB40	1983	
3	Hold Me Now	Thompson Twins	1983	
4	The Lovecats	The Cure	1983	
5	Come on Eileen	Dexys Midnight Runners and the Emerald Express	1982	
6	The Look of Love	ABC	1982	
7	Do You Really Want to Hurt Me	Culture Club	1982	
8	Save a Prayer	Duran Duran	1982	
9	Under Pressure	Queen & David Bowie	1981	
10	One Day in Your Life	Michael Jackson ^{(not on CD release)}	1981	
11	Favourite Shirts (Boy Meets Girl)	Haircut One Hundred	1981	
12	Ghost Town	The Specials	1981	
13	Going Underground	The Jam	1980	
14	Baggy Trousers	Madness	1980	
15	Antmusic^{(full version with cold ending)}	Adam and the Ants^{(previously unreleased)}	1980	
16	Atomic	Blondie	1980	

== See also ==
- Now That's What I Call Music discography
- Now That's What I Call Music
- Now That's What I Call Music (original UK album)
- Now That's What I Call Music (original U.S. album)
- Now That's What I Call Music (Asia)
