= Now That's What I Call the 80s =

Compilation album by Various artists
- Released: October 29, 2007
- Recorded: 1980, 1981, 1982, 1983, 1984, 1985, 1986, 1987, 1988, 1989
- Genre: Pop
- Label: EMI / Virgin / Universal

Now That's What I Call the 80s is a special edition of the (UK) Now series, released on October 29, 2007. The three-CD set has 60 hits from the 1980s.

== Track listing ==
=== CD 1 ===
1. Elton John - "I'm Still Standing" (1983)
2. a-ha - "Take On Me" (1985)
3. David Bowie & Mick Jagger - "Dancing in the Street" (1985)
4. Nik Kershaw - "I Won't Let the Sun Go Down on Me" (1983)
5. Philip Oakey & Giorgio Moroder - "Together in Electric Dreams" (1984)
6. Duran Duran - "A View to a Kill" (1985)
7. Spandau Ballet - "Gold" (1983)
8. Matthew Wilder - "Break My Stride" (1983)
9. DeBarge - "Rhythm of the Night" (1985)
10. Simply Red - "Money's Too Tight (to Mention)" (1985)
11. Simple Minds - "Don't You Forget About Me" (1985)
12. The Cure - "The Love Cats" (1983)
13. Soft Cell - "Say Hello, Wave Goodbye" (1982)
14. Genesis - "Mama" (1983)
15. Paul McCartney - "No More Lonely Nights" (1984)
16. Cyndi Lauper - "Time After Time" (1984)
17. Yazoo - "Only You" (1982)
18. Peter Gabriel & Kate Bush - "Don't Give Up" (1986)
19. Phil Collins - "In the Air Tonight" (1981)

=== CD 2 ===
1. The Proclaimers - "I'm Gonna Be (500 Miles)" (1988)
2. The Bangles - "Walk Like an Egyptian" (1986)
3. RUN-DMC feat. Aerosmith - "Walk This Way" (1986)
4. Billy Idol - "Rebel Yell" (1984)
5. Katrina & the Waves - "Walking on Sunshine" (1985)
6. The Housemartins - "Happy Hour" (1986)
7. Fine Young Cannibals - "Good Thing" (1989)
8. George Michael - "Faith" (1987)
9. Womack & Womack - "Teardrops" (1988)
10. Lionel Richie - "Dancing on the Ceiling" (1986)
11. The Communards - "Don't Leave Me This Way" (1986)
12. Erasure - "A Little Respect" (1988)
13. Climie Fisher - "Love Changes (Everything)" (1987)
14. Johnny Hates Jazz - "Shattered Dreams" (1987)
15. Level 42 - "Lessons in Love" (1986)
16. Bobby Brown - "My Prerogative" (1988)
17. Cameo - "Word Up!" (1986)
18. Whitney Houston - "How Will I Know" (1986)
19. Soul II Soul feat. Caron Wheeler - "Keep on Movin'" (1989)
20. Neneh Cherry - "Buffalo Stance" (1988)
21. UB40 - "Red Red Wine" (1983)

=== CD 3 ===
1. Wet Wet Wet - "Angel Eyes (Home and Away)" (1987)
2. Heart - "Alone" (1987)
3. Tears for Fears - "Everybody Wants to Rule the World" (1985)
4. Huey Lewis and the News - "The Power of Love" (1985)
5. Kiss - "Crazy Crazy Nights" (1987)
6. Whitesnake - "Here I Go Again '87" (1987)
7. Tina Turner - "The Best" (1989)
8. Robert Palmer - "Addicted to Love" (1986)
9. David Bowie - "Modern Love" (1983)
10. Starship - "We Built This City" (1985)
11. Danny Wilson - "Mary's Prayer" (1987)
12. Wham! - "Wake Me Up Before You Go-Go" (1984)
13. Cyndi Lauper - "Girls Just Want to Have Fun" (1984)
14. Kate Bush - "Running Up That Hill" (1985)
15. Simple Minds - "Alive and Kicking" (1986)
16. Steve Winwood - "Higher Love" (1986)
17. Swing Out Sister - "Breakout" (1986)
18. The Beautiful South - "You Keep It All In" (1989)
19. Squeeze - "Hourglass" (1987)
20. Harold Faltermeyer - "Axel F" (1984)

== Chart performance ==
Chart (2007)	Peak position
UK Compilation Albums (OCC)	6

== See also ==
- Now That's What I Call the 80s (American series)
