= Flying Colours (Chris de Burgh album) =

Studio album by Chris de Burgh
- Released: 3 October 1988
- Studios: Powerplay Studios (Zurich, Switzerland)
- Genre: Rock
- Length: 54:09
- Label: A&M
- Producers: Chris de Burgh; Paul Hardiman

Chris de Burgh chronology
Into the Light (1986)	Flying Colours (1988)	Spark to a Flame: The Very Best of Chris de Burgh (1989)

Flying Colours is the ninth studio album by British-Irish singer Chris de Burgh, released in 1988 by A&M Records.

The biggest single released from the album, "Missing You", peaked at No. 3 on the UK Singles Chart, and No. 1 in Ireland in December 1988. The album went straight to number one in the UK on 15 October 1988 and is the only de Burgh album to reach number one on the UK Albums Chart.

== Track listing ==
All tracks composed by Chris de Burgh.

No.	Title	Length
1.	"Sailing Away"	4:58
2.	"Carry Me (Like a Fire in Your Heart)"	4:24
3.	"Tender Hands"	4:29
4.	"A Night on the River"	3:48
5.	"Leather on My Shoes"	4:41
6.	"Suddenly Love"	3:12
7.	"The Simple Truth (A Child Is Born)"	4:25
8.	"Missing You"	4:07
9.	"I’m Not Scared Anymore"	4:46
10.	"Don’t Look Back"	2:55
11.	"Just a Word Away"	3:17
12.	"The Risen Lord"	3:40
13.	"The Last Time I Cried"	5:32
Total length:		54:09

- The track "The Simple Truth (A Child Is Born)" was a bonus track on the CD release, and was not included on the original vinyl or cassette versions of the album.

== Personnel ==
- Chris de Burgh – vocals, guitars
- Adrian Lee – keyboards
- Andy Richards – keyboards, synthesizers
- Phil Palmer – guitars
- Peter Van Hooke – drums, percussion
- Chris White – saxophones

=== Production ===
- Producers – Chris de Burgh (tracks 1–6, 8–14) and Paul Hardiman (tracks 1–7, 9–14).
- Engineered and mixed by Paul Hardiman
- Recorded at Powerplay Studios (Zürich, Switzerland).
- Mastered by Arnie Acosta at A&M Mastering Studios (Hollywood, California, USA)
- Photography – Paul Cox
- Art direction and design – Michael Ross
- Illustration – Romas Foord

== Charts ==
=== Weekly charts ===
Weekly chart performance for Flying Colours
Chart (1988–1989)	Peak position
Australian Albums (ARIA)	37
Dutch Albums (Album Top 100)	16
German Albums (Offizielle Top 100)	2
Irish Albums (IRMA)	1
Norwegian Albums (VG-lista)	10
Swiss Albums (Schweizer Hitparade)	2
UK Albums (Official Charts)	1

=== Year-end charts ===
1988 year-end chart performance for Flying Colours
Chart (1988)	Position
German Albums (Offizielle Top 100)	72

1989 year-end chart performance for Flying Colours
Chart (1989)	Position
Dutch Albums (Album Top 100)	50
German Albums (Offizielle Top 100)	8
Swiss Albums (Schweizer Hitparade)	18

== Certifications ==
Certifications for Flying Colours
Region	Certification	Certified units/sales
Canada (Music Canada)	Platinum	100,000^{^}
Germany (BVMI)	2× Platinum	1,000,000^{^}
United Kingdom (BPI)	Platinum	300,000^{^}
^{^} Shipments figures based on certification alone.
