= List of UK Albums Chart number ones of the 1980s =

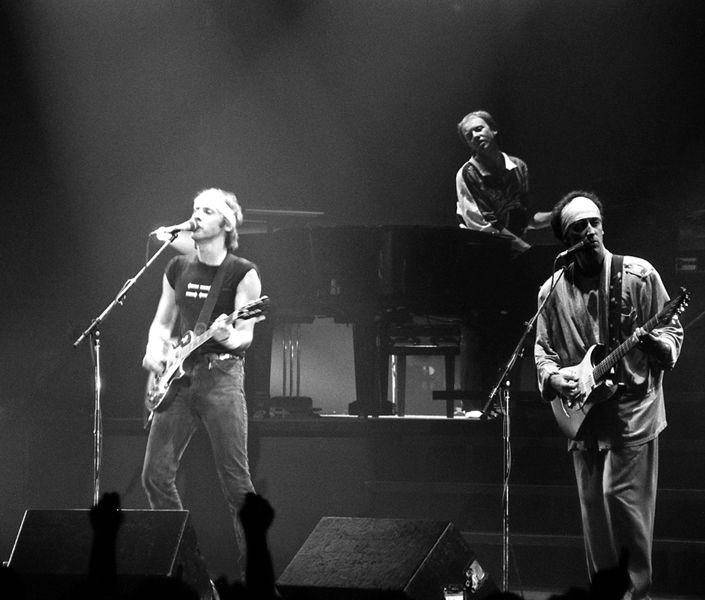
Dire Straits had three UK number-one albums during the 1980s. Their second, Brothers in Arms, was the biggest-selling album of the decade.

The UK Albums Chart is a weekly record chart based on album sales from Sunday to Saturday in the United Kingdom; during the 1980s, a total of 184 albums reached number one.

== Number ones ==
Key
No.	nth album to top the UK Albums Chart
re	Return of an album to number one
Silver	Silver certification
Gold	Gold certification
Platinum	Platinum certification
†	Best-selling album of the year
‡	Best-selling album of the decade

No.	Artist (Note: The artist, album, date of reaching number one and number of weeks at number one are those given by the OCC.)	Album	Record label (Note: The record labels are those given by the OCC.)	Reached number one (for the week ending)	Weeks at number one	Certification (as of 31 December 1989) (Note: The certifications are those awarded by the BPI as of 31 December 1989.)
1980
220	Rod Stewart	Greatest Hits, Vol. 1	Riva	8 December 1979	5	Platinum
re	ABBA	Greatest Hits Volume 2	Epic	12 January 1980	1	Platinum
221	The Pretenders	Pretenders	Real	19 January 1980	4	Platinum
222	Various artists	The Last Dance	Motown	16 February 1980	2	Gold
223	The Shadows	String of Hits	EMI	1 March 1980	3	Platinum
224	Johnny Mathis	Tears and Laughter	CBS	22 March 1980	2	Gold
225	Genesis	Duke	Charisma	5 April 1980	2	Platinum
226	Rose Royce	Greatest Hits	Whitfield	19 April 1980	2	Platinum
227	Sky	Sky 2	Ariola	3 May 1980	2	Platinum
228	Boney M.	The Magic of Boney M. – 20 Golden Hits	Hansa/Atlantic	17 May 1980	2	Platinum
229	Paul McCartney	McCartney II	Parlophone	31 May 1980	2	Gold
230	Peter Gabriel	Peter Gabriel	Charisma	14 June 1980	2	Gold
231	Roxy Music	Flesh and Blood	Polydor	28 June 1980	1	Platinum
232	The Rolling Stones	Emotional Rescue	Rolling Stones	5 July 1980	2	Gold
233	Queen	The Game	EMI	19 July 1980	2	Gold
234	Deep Purple	Deepest Purple: The Very Best of Deep Purple	Harvest	2 August 1980	1	Gold
235	AC/DC	Back in Black	Atlantic	9 August 1980	2	Platinum
re	Roxy Music	Flesh and Blood	Polydor	23 August 1980	3	Platinum
236	Gary Numan	Telekon	Beggars Banquet	13 September 1980	1	Gold
237	Kate Bush	Never for Ever	EMI	20 September 1980	1	Gold
238	David Bowie	Scary Monsters (And Super Creeps)	RCA	27 September 1980	2	Platinum
239	The Police	Zenyatta Mondatta	A&M	11 October 1980	4	Platinum
240	Barbra Streisand	Guilty	CBS	8 November 1980	2	Platinum
241	ABBA	Super Trouper †	Epic	22 November 1980	9	Platinum
1981
242	Adam and the Ants	Kings of the Wild Frontier †	CBS	24 January 1981	2	Platinum
243	John Lennon and Yoko Ono	Double Fantasy	Geffen	7 February 1981	2	Platinum
244	Phil Collins	Face Value	Virgin	21 February 1981	3	Platinum
re	Adam and the Ants	Kings of the Wild Frontier †	CBS	14 March 1981	10	Platinum
245	Starsound	Stars on 45	CBS	23 May 1981	5	Gold
246	Motörhead	No Sleep 'til Hammersmith	Bronze	27 June 1981	1	Gold
247	Various artists	Disco Daze and Disco Nites	Ronco	4 July 1981	1	Gold
248	Cliff Richard	Love Songs	EMI	11 July 1981	5	Platinum
249	Various artists	The Official BBC Album of the Royal Wedding	BBC	15 August 1981	2	Gold
250	Electric Light Orchestra	Time	Jet	29 August 1981	2	Platinum
251	Meat Loaf	Dead Ringer	Cleveland International /Epic	12 September 1981	2	Platinum
252	Genesis	Abacab	Charisma	26 September 1981	2	Platinum
253	The Police	Ghost in the Machine	A&M	10 October 1981	3	Platinum
254	The Human League	Dare	Virgin	31 October 1981	1	Platinum
255	Shakin' Stevens	Shaky	Epic	7 November 1981	1	Platinum
256	Queen	Greatest Hits	EMI	14 November 1981	4	6× Platinum
257	Various artists	Chart Hits '81	K-tel	12 December 1981	1	Platinum
258	ABBA	The Visitors	Epic	19 December 1981	3	Platinum
1982
re	The Human League	Dare	Virgin	9 January 1982	3	Platinum
259	Barbra Streisand	Love Songs †	CBS	30 January 1982	7	Platinum
260	The Jam	The Gift	Polydor	20 March 1982	1	Platinum
re	Barbra Streisand	Love Songs †	CBS	27 March 1982	2	Platinum
261	Iron Maiden	The Number of the Beast	EMI	10 April 1982	2	Platinum
262	Status Quo	1+9+8+2	Vertigo	24 April 1982	1	Gold
263	Barry Manilow	Barry Live in Britain	Arista	1 May 1982	1	Platinum
264	Paul McCartney	Tug of War	Parlophone	8 May 1982	2	Gold
265	Madness	Complete Madness	Stiff	22 May 1982	2	Platinum
266	Roxy Music	Avalon	E.G.	5 June 1982	1	Platinum
re	Madness	Complete Madness	Stiff	12 June 1982	1	Platinum
re	Roxy Music	Avalon	E.G.	19 June 1982	2	Platinum
267	ABC	The Lexicon of Love	Neutron	3 July 1982	4	Platinum
268	Original soundtrack	Fame	RSO	31 July 1982	1	Gold
269	The Kids from "Fame"	The Kids from "Fame"	BBC	7 August 1982	8	Platinum
270	Dire Straits	Love over Gold	Vertigo	2 October 1982	4	2× Platinum
re	The Kids from "Fame"	The Kids from "Fame"	BBC	30 October 1982	4	Platinum
271	ABBA	The Singles: The First Ten Years	Epic	27 November 1982	1	Platinum
272	John Lennon	The John Lennon Collection	Parlophone	6 December 1982	6	3× Platinum
1983
273	Various artists	Raiders of the Pop Charts	Ronco	15 January 1983	2	Platinum
274	Men at Work	Business as Usual	Epic	29 January 1983	5	Platinum
275	Michael Jackson	Thriller †	Epic	5 March 1983	1	11× Platinum
276	U2	War	Island	12 March 1983	1	Platinum
re	Michael Jackson	Thriller †	Epic	19 March 1983	1	11× Platinum
277	Tears for Fears	The Hurting	Mercury	26 March 1983	1	Platinum
278	Pink Floyd	The Final Cut	Harvest	2 April 1983	2	Gold
279	Bonnie Tyler	Faster Than the Speed of Night	CBS	16 April 1983	1	Silver
280	David Bowie	Let's Dance	EMI America	23 April 1983	3	Platinum
281	Spandau Ballet	True	Reformation	14 May 1983	1	Platinum
re	Michael Jackson	Thriller †	Epic	21 May 1983	5	11× Platinum
282	The Police	Synchronicity	A&M	25 June 1983	2	Platinum
283	Wham!	Fantastic	Innervision	9 July 1983	2	3× Platinum
284	Yazoo	You and Me Both	Mute	23 July 1983	2	Gold
285	The Beach Boys	The Very Best of The Beach Boys	Capitol	6 August 1983	2	Platinum
286	Michael Jackson and The Jackson 5	18 Greatest Hits	Motown; Telstar	20 August 1983	3	Platinum
re	The Beach Boys	The Very Best of The Beach Boys	Capitol	10 September 1983	1	Platinum
287	Paul Young	No Parlez	CBS	17 September 1983	1	3× Platinum
288	UB40	Labour of Love	DEP International	24 September 1983	1	2× Platinum
re	Paul Young	No Parlez	CBS	1 October 1983	2	3× Platinum
289	Genesis	Genesis	Charisma	15 October 1983	1	2× Platinum
290	Culture Club	Colour by Numbers	Virgin	22 October 1983	3	2× Platinum
291	Lionel Richie	Can't Slow Down	Motown	12 November 1983	1	3× Platinum
re	Culture Club	Colour by Numbers	Virgin	19 November 1983	2	2× Platinum
292	Duran Duran	Seven and the Ragged Tiger	EMI	3 December 1983	1	Platinum
re	Paul Young	No Parlez	CBS	10 December 1983	1	3× Platinum
293	Various artists	Now That's What I Call Music	Virgin/EMI	17 December 1983	4	3× Platinum
1984
re	Paul Young	No Parlez	CBS	14 January 1984	1	3× Platinum
re	Various artists	Now That's What I Call Music	Virgin/EMI	21 January 1984	1	3× Platinum
re	Michael Jackson	Thriller	Epic	28 January 1984	1	11× Platinum
294	Eurythmics	Touch	RCA	4 February 1984	2	Platinum
295	Simple Minds	Sparkle in the Rain	Virgin	18 February 1984	1	Platinum
296	Thompson Twins	Into the Gap	Arista	25 February 1984	3	2× Platinum
297	Howard Jones	Human's Lib	WEA	17 March 1984	2	2× Platinum
re	Lionel Richie	Can't Slow Down †	Motown	31 March 1984	2	3× Platinum
298	Various artists	Now That's What I Call Music II	Virgin/EMI	14 April 1984	5	2× Platinum
299	Bob Marley & The Wailers	Legend	Island	19 May 1984	12	3× Platinum
300	Various artists	Now That's What I Call Music 3	Virgin/EMI	11 August 1984	8	2× Platinum
301	David Bowie	Tonight	EMI America	6 October 1984	1	Gold
302	U2	The Unforgettable Fire	Island	13 October 1984	2	2× Platinum
303	Big Country	Steeltown	Mercury	27 October 1984	1	Gold
304	Paul McCartney	Give My Regards to Broad Street	Parlophone	3 November 1984	1	Platinum
305	Frankie Goes to Hollywood	Welcome to the Pleasuredome	ZTT	10 November 1984	1	3× Platinum
306	Wham!	Make It Big	Epic	17 November 1984	2	4× Platinum
307	Various artists	The Hits Album/The Hits Tape	CBS/WEA	1 December 1984	7	3× Platinum
1985
308	Alison Moyet	Alf	CBS	19 January 1985	1	4× Platinum
309	Foreigner	Agent Provocateur	Atlantic	26 January 1985	3	Platinum
310	Bruce Springsteen	Born in the U.S.A.	CBS	16 February 1985	1	3× Platinum
311	The Smiths	Meat Is Murder	Rough Trade	23 February 1985	1	Gold
312	Phil Collins	No Jacket Required	Virgin	2 March 1985	5	6× Platinum
313	Paul Young	The Secret of Association	CBS	6 April 1985	1	2× Platinum
314	Various artists	The Hits Album 2/The Hits Tape 2	CBS/WEA	13 April 1985	6	2× Platinum
315	Dire Straits	Brothers in Arms ‡	Vertigo	25 May 1985	2	13× Platinum
316	The Style Council	Our Favourite Shop	Polydor	8 June 1985	1	Gold
317	Bryan Ferry	Boys and Girls	E.G.	15 June 1985	2	Platinum
318	Marillion	Misplaced Childhood	EMI	29 June 1985	1	Platinum
re	Bruce Springsteen	Born in the U.S.A.	CBS	6 July 1985	4	3× Platinum
re	Dire Straits	Brothers in Arms ‡	Vertigo	3 August 1985	2	13× Platinum
319	Various artists	Now That's What I Call Music 5	Virgin/EMI	17 August 1985	5	2× Platinum
320	Madonna	Like a Virgin	Sire	21 September 1985	1	3× Platinum
321	Kate Bush	Hounds of Love	EMI	28 September 1985	2	2× Platinum
re	Madonna	Like a Virgin	Sire	12 October 1985	1	3× Platinum
re	Kate Bush	Hounds of Love	EMI	28 September 1985	1	2× Platinum
322	George Benson	The Love Songs	K-tel	26 October 1985	1	2× Platinum
323	Simple Minds	Once Upon a Time	Virgin	2 November 1985	1	3× Platinum
re	George Benson	The Love Songs	K-tel	9 November 1985	1	2× Platinum
324	Sade	Promise	Epic	16 November 1985	2	2× Platinum
325	Various artists	The Greatest Hits of 1985	Telstar	30 November 1985	1	Platinum
326	Various artists	Now That's What I Call Music 6	Virgin/EMI	7 December 1985	2	4× Platinum
327	Various artists	Now – The Christmas Album	Virgin/EMI	21 December 1985	2	4× Platinum
1986
re	Various artists	Now That's What I Call Music 6	Virgin/EMI	4 January 1986	2	4× Platinum
re	Dire Straits	Brothers in Arms ‡	Vertigo	18 January 1986	10	13× Platinum
328	Various artists	Hits 4	CBS/WEA/RCA/Ariola	29 March 1986	4	Platinum
329	Bryan Ferry and Roxy Music	Street Life: 20 Great Hits	E.G.	26 April 1986	5	Platinum
330	Peter Gabriel	So	Virgin	31 May 1986	2	3× Platinum
331	Queen	A Kind of Magic	EMI	14 June 1986	1	2× Platinum
332	Genesis	Invisible Touch	Virgin	21 June 1986	3	4× Platinum
333	Madonna	True Blue †	Sire	12 July 1986	6	6× Platinum
334	Various artists	Now That's What I Call Music 7	Virgin/EMI	23 August 1986	5	2× Platinum
335	Five Star	Silk and Steel	Tent	27 September 1986	1	4× Platinum
336	Paul Simon	Graceland	Warner Bros.	4 October 1986	5	5× Platinum
337	The Police	Every Breath You Take: The Singles	A&M	8 November 1986	2	3× Platinum
338	Various artists	Hits 5	CBS/RCA/Ariola/WEA	22 November 1986	2	3× Platinum
339	Various artists	Now That's What I Call Music 8	Virgin/EMI/PolyGram	6 December 1986	6	4× Platinum
1987
340	Kate Bush	The Whole Story	EMI	17 January 1987	2	2× Platinum
re	Paul Simon	Graceland	Warner Bros.	31 January 1987	3	5× Platinum
341	Original London cast	The Phantom of the Opera	Really Useful	21 February 1987	3	3× Platinum
342	Hot Chocolate	The Very Best of Hot Chocolate	Rak	14 March 1987	1	Platinum
343	U2	The Joshua Tree	Island	21 March 1987	2	6× Platinum
344	Various artists	Now That's What I Call Music 9	Virgin/EMI/PolyGram	5 April 1987	5	2× Platinum
345	Curiosity Killed the Cat	Keep Your Distance	Mercury	9 May 1987	2	Platinum
346	Swing Out Sister	It's Better to Travel	Mercury	23 May 1987	2	Platinum
347	Simple Minds	Live in the City of Light	Virgin	6 June 1987	1	2× Platinum
348	Whitney Houston	Whitney	Arista	13 June 1987	6	6× Platinum
349	Terence Trent D'Arby	Introducing the Hardline According to Terence Trent D'Arby	CBS	25 July 1987	1	5× Platinum
350	Various artists	Hits 6	CBS/BMG/WEA	1 August 1987	4	3× Platinum
351	Def Leppard	Hysteria	Bludgeon Riffola	29 August 1987	1	2× Platinum
re	Various artists	Hits 6	CBS/BMG/WEA	5 September 1987	1	3× Platinum
352	Michael Jackson	Bad †	Epic	12 September 1987	5	14× Platinum
353	Bruce Springsteen	Tunnel of Love	CBS	17 October 1987	1	Platinum
354	Sting	...Nothing Like the Sun	A&M	24 October 1987	1	Platinum
355	Fleetwood Mac	Tango in the Night	Warner Bros.	31 October 1987	2	8× Platinum
356	George Michael	Faith	Epic	14 November 1987	1	2× Platinum
357	T'Pau	Bridge of Spies	Siren	21 November 1987	1	4× Platinum
358	Rick Astley	Whenever You Need Somebody	RCA	28 November 1987	1	4× Platinum
359	Various artists	Now That's What I Call Music 10	Virgin/EMI/PolyGram	5 December 1987	6	4× Platinum
1988
360	Wet Wet Wet	Popped In Souled Out	The Precious Organisation	16 January 1988	1	5× Platinum
361	Johnny Hates Jazz	Turn Back the Clock	Virgin	23 January 1988	1	2× Platinum
re	Terence Trent D'Arby	Introducing the Hardline According to Terence Trent D'Arby	CBS	30 January 1988	8	5× Platinum
362	Morrissey	Viva Hate	His Master's Voice	26 March 1988	1	Gold
363	Various artists	Now That's What I Call Music 11	Virgin/EMI/PolyGram	2 April 1988	3	4× Platinum
364	Iron Maiden	Seventh Son of a Seventh Son	EMI	23 April 1988	1	Gold
365	Erasure	The Innocents	Mute	30 April 1988	1	2× Platinum
re	Fleetwood Mac	Tango in the Night	Warner Bros.	7 May 1988	2	8× Platinum
366	Prince	Lovesexy	Paisley Park	21 May 1988	1	Platinum
re	Fleetwood Mac	Tango in the Night	Warner Bros.	28 May 1988	1	8× Platinum
367	Various artists	Nite Flite	CBS	4 June 1988	4	Platinum
368	Tracy Chapman	Tracy Chapman	Elektra	2 July 1988	3	Platinum
369	Various artists	Now That's What I Call Music 12	Virgin/EMI/PolyGram	23 July 1988	5	2× Platinum
370	Kylie Minogue	Kylie †	PWL	27 August 1988	4	7× Platinum
371	Various artists	Hot City Nights	Vertigo	24 September 1988	1	Platinum
372	Bon Jovi	New Jersey	Vertigo	1 October 1988	2	Platinum
373	Chris de Burgh	Flying Colours	A&M	15 October 1988	1	Platinum
374	U2	Rattle and Hum	Island	22 October 1988	1	3× Platinum
375	Dire Straits	Money for Nothing	Vertigo	29 October 1988	3	4× Platinum
re	Kylie Minogue	Kylie †	PWL	19 November 1988	2	7× Platinum
376	Various artists	Now That's What I Call Music XIII	Virgin/EMI/PolyGram	3 December 1988	3	4× Platinum
377	Cliff Richard	Private Collection: 1979–1988	EMI	24 December 1988	2	4× Platinum
1989
re	Various artists	Now That's What I Call Music XIII	Virgin/EMI/PolyGram	7 January 1989	1	4× Platinum
re	Erasure	The Innocents	Mute	14 January 1989	1	2× Platinum
378	Roy Orbison	The Legendary Roy Orbison	Telstar	21 January 1989	3	2× Platinum
379	New Order	Technique	Factory	11 February 1989	1	Gold
380	Fine Young Cannibals	The Raw & the Cooked	London	18 February 1989	1	3× Platinum
381	Simply Red	A New Flame	WEA	25 February 1989	4	7× Platinum
382	Gloria Estefan and Miami Sound Machine	Anything for You	Epic	25 March 1989	1	4× Platinum
383	Madonna	Like a Prayer	Sire	1 April 1989	2	2× Platinum
384	Deacon Blue	When the World Knows Your Name	CBS	15 April 1989	2	2× Platinum
re	Simply Red	A New Flame	WEA	29 April 1989	1	7× Platinum
385	Holly Johnson	Blast	MCA	6 May 1989	1	Platinum
386	Simple Minds	Street Fighting Years	Virgin	13 May 1989	1	2× Platinum
387	Jason Donovan	Ten Good Reasons †	PWL	20 May 1989	2	5× Platinum
388	Queen	The Miracle	Parlophone	3 June 1989	1	Platinum
re	Jason Donovan	Ten Good Reasons †	PWL	10 June 1989	2	5× Platinum
389	Paul McCartney	Flowers in the Dirt	Parlophone	24 June 1989	1	Platinum
390	Prince	Batman	Warner Bros.	1 July 1989	1	Platinum
391	Transvision Vamp	Velveteen	MCA	8 July 1989	1	Platinum
392	Soul II Soul	Club Classics Vol. I	10	15 July 1989	1	2× Platinum
re	Simply Red	A New Flame	WEA	22 July 1989	2	7× Platinum
393	Gloria Estefan	Cuts Both Ways	Epic	5 August 1989	6	2× Platinum
394	Original stage cast	Aspects of Love	Really Useful/Polydor	16 September 1989	1	Platinum
395	Eurythmics	We Too Are One	RCA	23 September 1989	1	Platinum
396	Tina Turner	Foreign Affair	Capitol	30 September 1989	1	3× Platinum
397	Tears for Fears	The Seeds of Love	Fontana	7 October 1989	1	Platinum
398	Tracy Chapman	Crossroads	Elektra	14 October 1989	1	Platinum
399	Kylie Minogue	Enjoy Yourself	PWL	21 October 1989	1	4× Platinum
400	Erasure	Wild!	Mute	28 October 1989	2	Platinum
401	Chris Rea	The Road to Hell	WEA	11 November 1989	3	2× Platinum
402	Phil Collins	...But Seriously	Virgin	2 December 1989	8	4× Platinum

=== By artist ===
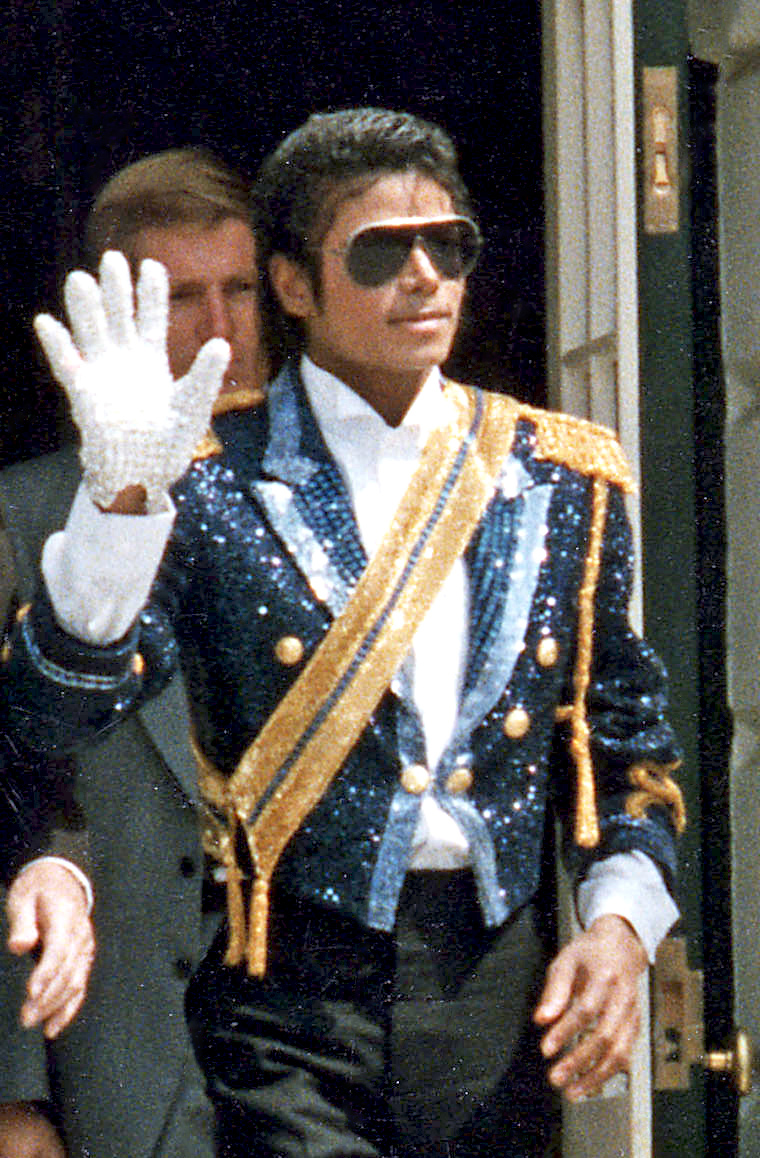
Michael Jackson achieved three number ones on the albums chart this decade.

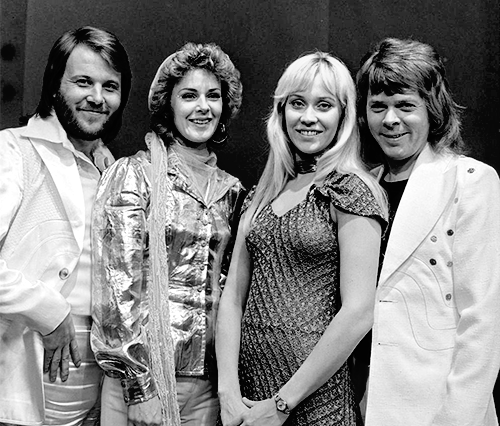
Swedish group ABBA spent 14 weeks at the top of the UK Album Chart during the 1980s.

Ten artists spent 10 weeks or more at number one on the album chart during the 1980s.

Artist	Number ones	Weeks at number one
Dire Straits	3	21
Michael Jackson	3	16
ABBA	4	14
Phil Collins	3	13
Adam and the Ants	1	12
The Kids from "Fame"	1	12
Bob Marley & The Wailers	1	12
The Police	4	11
Barbra Streisand	2	11
Madonna	3	10

=== By record label ===
Six record labels spent 20 weeks or more at number one on the album chart during the 1980s.

Record label	Number ones	Weeks at number one
Virgin Records	24	95
EMI Records	26	91
CBS	19	83
WEA	8	36
PolyGram	6	29
Vertigo Records	6	25

== Christmas number ones ==
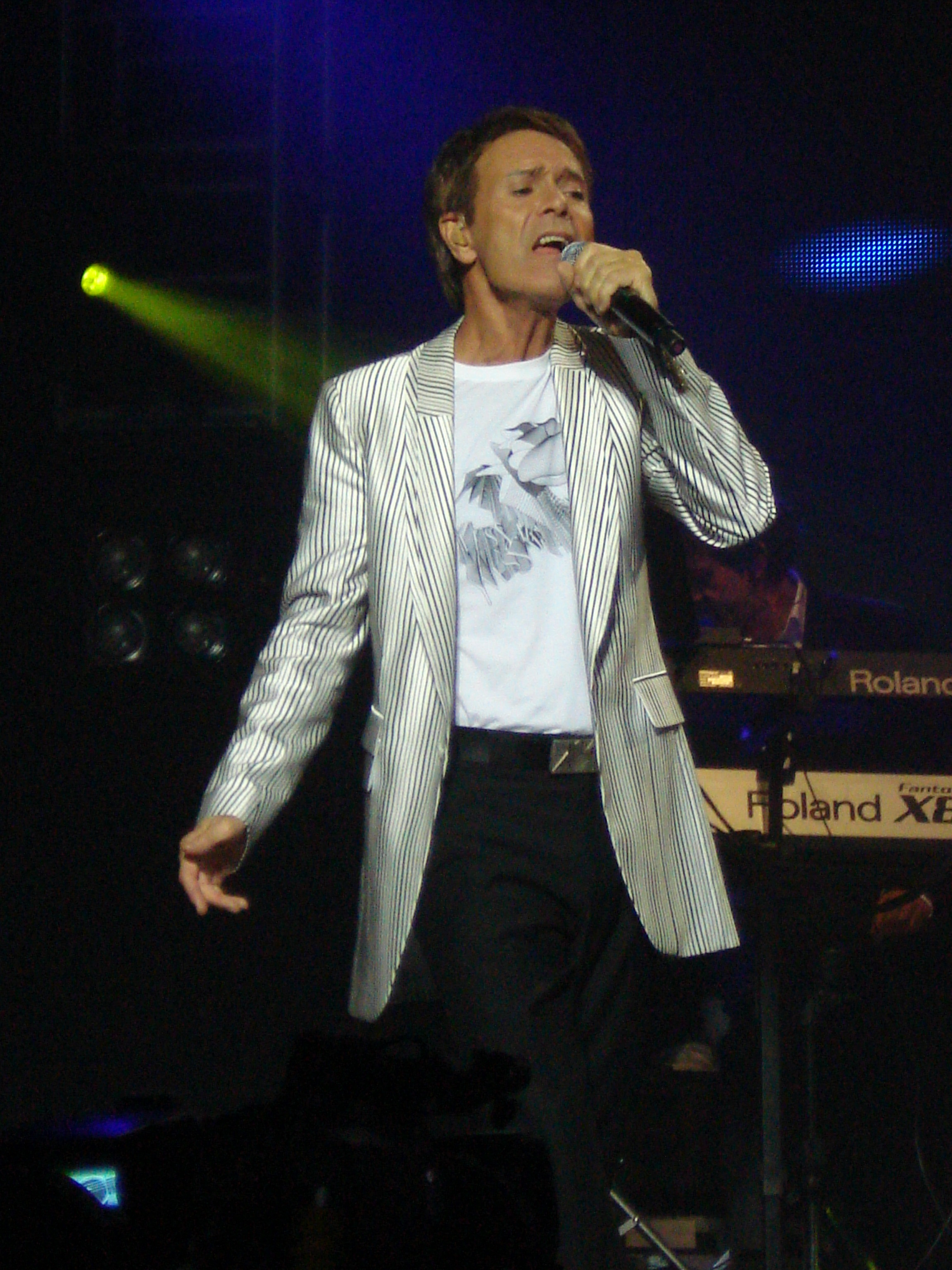
Cliff Richard's album Private Collection: 1979–1988 was the 1988 Christmas number one.

In the UK, Christmas number one albums are those that are at the top of the UK Albums Chart on Christmas Day. Typically, this will refer to the album that was announced as number one on the Sunday before 25 December—when Christmas Day falls on a Sunday itself, the official number one is considered by the OCC to be the one announced on that day's chart. During the 1980s, the following albums were Christmas number ones.

Year	Artist	Album	Record label	Weeks at number one	Ref.
1980	ABBA	Super Trouper	Epic	9	
1981	ABBA	The Visitors	Epic	3	
1982	John Lennon	The John Lennon Collection	Parlophone	6	
1983	Various artists	Now That's What I Call Music	Virgin/EMI	5	
1984	Various artists	Hits 1	CBS/WEA	7	
1985	Various artists	Now – The Christmas Album	Virgin/EMI	2	
1986	Various artists	Now That's What I Call Music 8	Virgin/EMI/PolyGram	6	
1987	Various artists	Now That's What I Call Music 10	Virgin/EMI/PolyGram	6	
1988	Cliff Richard	Private Collection: 1979–1988 (Note: Private Collection: 1979–1988 was announced as the 1988 Christmas number one a day later than usual, on Monday 26 December.)	EMI	2	
1989	Phil Collins	...But Seriously	Virgin	15	
