= Hits 2 =

The Hits Album 2

Compilation album by Various Artists
- Released: 1 April 1985
- Genre: Pop
- Label: CBS and WEA

The Hits Albums chronology
Hits 1 (1984)	The Hits Album 2 (1985)	Hits 3 (1985)

The Hits Album 2 or Hits 2 as it is often called, is a compilation album that was released in April 1985 in the UK. The spine of the album as well as the inside cover lists the title as HITS 2 THE ALBUM. It was released by CBS and WEA. It reached #1 in the UK Top 100 Album Chart for 6 weeks. Selected tracks from this and the first album were released on VHS and Betamax by CBS/FOX Video, under the title The Hits Video.

Hits 2 features four songs which reached number one on the UK Singles Chart: "You Spin Me Round (Like a Record)", "Easy Lover", "I Want To Know What Love Is" and "I Should Have Known Better".

== Track listing ==
Record/Tape 1 Side 1 (1)

1. Dead or Alive – "You Spin Me Round (Like a Record)"
2. Howard Jones – "Things Can Only Get Better"
3. King – "Love & Pride"
4. Nik Kershaw – "Wide Boy"
5. New Edition – "Mr. Telephone Man"
6. Kirsty MacColl – "A New England"
7. Strawberry Switchblade – "Since Yesterday"

Record/Tape 1 Side 2 (2)

1. Prince – "1999"
2. Philip Bailey and Phil Collins – "Easy Lover"
3. Ashford & Simpson – "Solid"
4. Chaka Khan – "This Is My Night"
5. James Ingram and Michael McDonald – "Yah Mo B There"
6. Dazz Band – "Let It All Blow"
7. Art of Noise – "Close (to the Edit)"

Record/Tape 2 Side 1 (3)

1. Foreigner – "I Want to Know What Love Is"
2. Paul Young – "Everything Must Change"
3. Chicago – "You're the Inspiration"
4. Jim Diamond – "I Should Have Known Better"
5. Amii Stewart – "Friends"
6. The Commodores – "Nightshift"
7. Alison Moyet – "That Ole Devil Called Love"

Record/Tape 2 Side 2 (4)

1. Stephen "Tin Tin" Duffy – "Kiss Me"
2. Little Benny & the Masters – "Who Comes to Boogie"
3. Matt Bianco – "More Than I Can Bear"
4. Big Sound Authority – "This House (Is Where Your Love Stands)"
5. ZZ Top – "Legs"
6. Mick Jagger – "Just Another Night"
7. Shakin' Stevens – "Breaking Up My Heart"

== Video selection ==
1. Dead or Alive – "You Spin Me Round (Like a Record)"
2. Howard Jones – "Things Can Only Get Better"
3. King – "Love & Pride"
4. Nik Kershaw – "Wide Boy"
5. Shakin' Stevens – "Breaking Up My Heart"
6. Wham! – "Everything She Wants"†
7. Strawberry Switchblade – "Since Yesterday"
8. Paul Young – "Everything Must Change"
9. Alison Moyet – "That Ole Devil Called Love"
10. Matt Bianco – "More Than I Can Bear"
11. Big Sound Authority – "This House (Is Where Your Love Stands)"
12. New Edition – "Mr. Telephone Man"
13. The S.O.S. Band – "Just Be Good to Me"††
14. Miami Sound Machine – "Dr. Beat"††
15. Billy Ocean – "Loverboy"†
16. Sade – "Smooth Operator"††
17. George Michael – "Careless Whisper"††
18. Associates – "Breakfast"†
19. Echo & the Bunnymen – "The Killing Moon"†
20. The Stranglers – "Skin Deep"††
21. Everything but the Girl – "Each and Every One"††
22. The Monochrome Set – "Jacob's Ladder"†
23. The Sisters of Mercy – "No Time to Cry"†

† Never appeared on any Hits album.

†† Previously appeared on Hits 1.
