= The Legendary Roy Orbison =

Greatest hits album by Roy Orbison
- Released: October 1988
- Recorded: March 25, 1960–January 16, 1965
- Genre: Rock, pop
- Label: Telstar Records

Professional ratings
Review scores
Source	Rating
The Encyclopedia of Popular Music	4/5 stars

The Legendary Roy Orbison is a greatest hits album by Roy Orbison. It was released by Telstar Records in 1988 and reached number one on the UK Albums Chart in 1989, where it was a posthumous number one.

== Track listing ==
1. Oh Pretty Woman
2. Only the Lonely
3. Love Hurts
4. Lana
5. My Prayer
6. Goodnight
7. Falling
8. Blue Angel
9. All I Have to Do Is Dream
10. In Dreams
11. Crying
12. Blue Bayou
13. Dream Baby (How Long Must I Dream)
14. The Great Pretender
15. Running Scared
16. Borne on the Wind
17. "Mean Woman Blues"
18. Pretty Paper
19. The Crowd
20. It's Over

== Charts ==
Chart (1988)	Peak position
UK Albums Chart	1

1989 year-end chart performance for The Legendary Roy Orbison by Roy Orbison
Chart (1989)	Position
European Albums (Music & Media)	96
