= Now – The Christmas Album =

Now That's What I Call Music - The Christmas Album

Compilation album by Various artists
- Released: 11 November 1985
- Recorded: 1942, 1964, 1971, 1973, 1974, 1975, 1976, 1979, 1980, 1982, 1984
- Genre: Rock/Pop
- Length: 57:53 (CD)
- Label: Virgin / EMI

Now That's What I Call Music - The Christmas Album is a compilation album released in 1985. The album is part of the Now series in the United Kingdom, and collects popular Christmas songs of the last few decades. It reached number one on the UK Albums Chart for two weeks, in between two runs of Now That's What I Call Music 6. The album has since been superseded by subsequent two-disc and later three-disc releases in the 2000s.

== Track listing ==
1. Band Aid : "Do They Know It's Christmas?" – 3:41
2. Roy Wood with Wizzard : "I Wish It Could Be Christmas Everyday" – 4:42
3. Slade : "Merry Xmas Everybody" – 3:44
4. Wham! : "Last Christmas"' – 4:28
5. Elton John : "Step into Christmas" – 4:33
6. Mike Oldfield : "In Dulce Jubilo" – 2:51
7. Gary Glitter : "Another Rock n' Roll Christmas" – 3:45
8. Paul McCartney : "Wonderful Christmastime" – 3:49
9. Shakin' Stevens : "Blue Christmas" – 2:48
10. John Lennon & the Plastic Ono Band : "Happy Xmas (War is Over)" – 3.36
11. Greg Lake : "I Believe in Father Christmas" – 3.31
12. Chris De Burgh : "A Spaceman Came Travelling" – 5:04
13. Jona Lewie : "Stop the Cavalry" – 2:57
14. The Beach Boys : "Little Saint Nick" – 2:01
15. Queen : "Thank God It's Christmas" – 4:19
16. Mud : "Lonely This Christmas" – 3:34
17. Johnny Mathis : "When a Child is Born (Soleado)" – 3:42
18. Bing Crosby : "White Christmas" – 3:06

== Track notes ==
The track listing above is for the original 18 track release of this album. The above running order is for The Christmas Album.

== Format and compilation name ==
The name of the compilation varied depending on what format it was purchased on.

The LP was called The Christmas Album, the cassette was named The Christmas Tape and the CD was known as The Christmas Compact Disc. The CD of this compilation was released a year after the original album in 1986 - it is also very collectable.

== 2016 vinyl reissue ==
A new version of the compilation, with a new track list and artwork inspired by the original, was released on 26 November 2016 on vinyl only.

Side A

1. John & Yoko and the Plastic Ono Band with the Harlem Community Choir : "Happy Xmas (War is Over)"
2. Wham! : "Last Christmas"
3. The Pogues feat. Kirsty MacColl : "Fairytale of New York"
4. Shakin' Stevens : "Merry Christmas Everyone"
5. Brenda Lee : "Rockin' Around the Christmas Tree"
6. Andy Williams : "It's the Most Wonderful Time of the Year"

Side B

1. Wizzard : "I Wish It Could be Christmas Everyday"
2. Chris Rea : "Driving Home for Christmas"
3. Dean Martin : "Let It Snow! Let It Snow! Let It Snow!"
4. Slade : "Merry Xmas Everybody"
5. Band Aid : "Do They Know It's Christmas?"
6. Bing Crosby : "White Christmas"
