= Hits 1 =

The Hits Album

Compilation album by Various artists
- Released: 19 November 1984
- Genre: Pop
- Label: CBS and WEA

The Hits Albums chronology
The Hits Album (1984)	Hits 2 (1985)

The Hits Album, or Hits 1 as it is often called, is a compilation album released by CBS (Now Sony BMG) and WEA in November 1984. The album was released as a rival to the already successful Now That's What I Call Music series which EMI and Virgin Records had launched in November 1983. The Hits Album reached No. 1 in the UK Top 100 Albums chart for seven weeks and remained in the chart for 36 weeks. This album kept Now 4 from the coveted No. 1 spot over Christmas 1984 – the only Now album in the original series not to reach No. 1 in the UK Album Chart (to 1989).

It was released on double LP and cassette and launched the Hits Series.

Hits 1 features three songs which reached number one on the UK Singles Chart: "Freedom", "I Feel for You" and "Careless Whisper".

== Track listing ==
Record/Tape 1 Side 1 (1)

1. Wham! – "Freedom"
2. Howard Jones – "Like to Get to Know You Well"
3. Alison Moyet – "All Cried Out"
4. Paul Young – "I'm Gonna Tear Your Playhouse Down"
5. Alphaville – "Big in Japan"
6. Laura Branigan – "Self Control"
7. Ray Parker Jr. – "Ghostbusters"
8. Michael Jackson – "Thriller"

Record/Tape 1 Side 2 (2)

1. Chaka Khan – "I Feel for You"
2. Billy Ocean – "Caribbean Queen"
3. The Jacksons – "Body"
4. The S.O.S. Band – "Just Be Good to Me"
5. Deniece Williams – "Let's Hear It for the Boy"
6. Miami Sound Machine – "Dr. Beat"
7. Sister Sledge – "Lost in Music"
8. Prince and The Revolution – "Purple Rain"

Record/Tape 2 Side 1 (3)

1. George Michael – "Careless Whisper"
2. The Cars – "Drive"
3. Chicago – "Hard Habit to Break"
4. Cyndi Lauper – "All Through the Night"
5. Thompson Twins – "Sister of Mercy"
6. The Stranglers – "Skin Deep"
7. Everything but the Girl – "Each and Every One"
8. Sade – "Smooth Operator"

Record/Tape 2 Side 2 (4)

1. ZZ Top – "Gimme All Your Lovin'"
2. Van Halen – "Jump"
3. Kenny Loggins – "Footloose"
4. Adam Ant – "Apollo 9"
5. Meat Loaf – "Modern Girl"
6. Rod Stewart – "Some Guys Have All the Luck"
7. Shakin' Stevens – "Teardrops"
8. Neil – "Hole in My Shoe"
