= List of UK top-ten albums in 1983 =

List of top ten bestselling music albums in UK in 1983

The UK Albums Chart is one of many music charts compiled by the Official Charts Company that calculates the best-selling albums of the week in the United Kingdom. Before 2004, the chart was only based on the sales of physical albums. This list shows albums that peaked in the Top 10 of the UK Albums Chart during 1983, as well as albums which peaked in 1982 and 1984 but were in the top 10 in 1983. The entry date is when the album appeared in the top ten for the first time (week ending, as published by the Official Charts Company, which is six days after the chart is announced).

The first new number-one album of the year was the compilation album Raiders of the Pop Charts. Overall, twenty-one different albums peaked at number-one in 1983, with Michael Jackson (2) having the most albums hit that position.

== Background ==
=== Best-selling albums ===
Michael Jackson had the best-selling album of the year with Thriller. No Parlez by Paul Young came in second place Colour by Numbers by Culture Club, Let's Dance by David Bowie and Fantastic by Wham! made up the top five. Albums by Spandau Ballet, Elaine Paige, Genesis and Lionel Richie were also in the top-ten best selling albums of the year.

== Top-ten albums ==
Key

| Symbol | Meaning |
|---|---|
| ‡ | Album peaked in 1982 but still in chart in 1983. |
| ♦ | Album released in 1983 but peaked in 1984. |
| (#) | Year-end top-ten album position and rank |
| Entered | The date that the album first appeared in the chart. |
| Peak | Highest position that the album reached in the UK Albums Chart. |

| Entered (week ending) | Weeks in top 10 | Single | Artist | Peak | Peak reached (week ending) | Weeks at peak |
Albums in 1982
| 22 May 1982 | 25 | Rio ‡ | Duran Duran | 2 | 29 May 1982 | 1 |
| 31 July 1982 | 24 | The Kids from "Fame" ‡ | The Kids from "Fame" | 1 | 7 August 1982 | 12 |
| 23 October 1982 | 5 | Kissing to Be Clever ‡ | Culture Club | 5 | 30 October 1982 | 2 |
| 6 November 1982 | 4 | Olivia's Greatest Hits | Olivia Newton-John | 8 | 15 January 1983 | 2 |
| 13 November 1982 | 11 | Hello, I Must Be Going! ‡ | Phil Collins | 2 | 13 November 1982 | 2 |
| 13 November 1982 | 15 | Heartbreaker ‡ | Dionne Warwick | 3 | 20 November 1982 | 2 |
| 13 November 1982 | 8 | From the Makers of... ‡ | Status Quo | 4 | 27 November 1982 | 1 |
| 20 November 1982 | 9 | The Singles: The First Ten Years ‡ | ABBA | 1 | 27 November 1982 | 1 |
| 4 December 1982 | 14 | The John Lennon Collection ‡ | John Lennon | 1 | 4 December 1982 | 6 |
| 4 December 1982 | 6 | Pearls II ‡ | Elkie Brooks | 5 | 11 December 1982 | 1 |
| 4 December 1982 | 5 | 20 Greatest Love Songs ‡ | Nat King Cole | 7 | 4 December 1982 | 4 |
| 11 December 1982 | 5 | Love Songs ‡ | Diana Ross | 5 | 25 December 1982 | 1 |
| 18 December 1982 | 3 | Dig the New Breed ‡ | The Jam | 2 | 18 December 1982 | 1 |
Albums in 1983
| 8 January 1983 | 6 | Raiders of the Pop Charts | Various artists | 1 | 15 January 1983 | 2 |
| 8 January 1983 | 3 | Friends | Shalamar | 6 | 15 January 1983 | 1 |
| 15 January 1983 | 8 | Richard Clayderman | Richard Clayderman | 2 | 5 February 1983 | 1 |
| 22 January 1983 | 7 | Business as Usual | Men at Work | 1 | 29 January 1983 | 5 |
| 22 January 1983 | 2 | The Art of Falling Apart | Soft Cell | 5 | 22 January 1983 | 1 |
| 22 January 1983 | 3 | Feline | The Stranglers | 4 | 29 January 1983 | 1 |
| 29 January 1983 | 2 | Cacharpaya (Panpipes of the Andes) | Incantation | 9 | 29 January 1983 | 1 |
| 5 February 1983 | 4 | Night and Day | Joe Jackson | 3 | 5 February 1983 | 1 |
| 5 February 1983 | 2 | Killer on the Rampage | Eddy Grant | 7 | 12 February 1983 | 1 |
| 12 February 1983 | 3 | Porcupine | Echo & the Bunnymen | 2 | 12 February 1983 | 1 |
| 12 February 1983 | 5 | Visions | Various artists | 5 | 26 February 1983 | 2 |
| 19 February 1983 | 3 | Another Page | Christopher Cross | 4 | 19 February 1983 | 2 |
| 19 February 1983 | 76 | Thriller | Michael Jackson | 1 | 5 March 1983 | 9 |
| 19 February 1983 | 1 | Frontiers | Journey | 6 | 19 February 1983 | 1 |
| 26 February 1983 | 3 | Jane Fonda's Workout Record | Jane Fonda | 7 | 5 March 1983 | 1 |
| 5 March 1983 | 2 | Quick Step & Side Kick | Thompson Twins | 2 | 5 March 1983 | 1 |
| 5 March 1983 | 4 | Toto IV | Toto | 4 | 5 March 1983 | 1 |
| 5 March 1983 | 1 | Lionel Richie | Lionel Richie | 9 | 5 March 1983 | 1 |
| 12 March 1983 | 7 | War | U2 | 1 | 12 March 1983 | 1 |
| 12 March 1983 | 3 | Hotline | Various artists | 3 | 12 March 1983 | 2 |
| 12 March 1983 | 2 | Thunder and Lightning | Thin Lizzy | 4 | 12 March 1983 | 1 |
| 12 March 1983 | 2 | Dazzle Ships | Orchestral Manoeuvres in the Dark | 5 | 12 March 1983 | 1 |
| 12 March 1983 | 10 | Sweet Dreams (Are Made of This) | Eurythmics | 3 | 26 March 1983 | 1 |
| 12 March 1983 | 22 | True | Spandau Ballet | 1 | 14 May 1983 | 1 |
| 19 March 1983 | 12 | The Hurting | Tears for Fears | 1 | 26 March 1983 | 1 |
| 26 March 1983 | 5 | Chart Runners | Various artists | 4 | 2 April 1983 | 2 |
| 26 March 1983 | 1 | Script for a Jester's Tear | Marillion | 7 | 2 April 1983 | 1 |
| 26 March 1983 | 3 | Deep Sea Skiving | Bananarama | 8 | 26 March 1983 | 3 |
| 26 March 1983 | 3 | The Key | Joan Armatrading | 10 | 26 March 1983 | 3 |
| 2 April 1983 | 5 | The Final Cut | Pink Floyd | 1 | 2 April 1983 | 2 |
| 16 April 1983 | 6 | Faster Than the Speed of Night | Bonnie Tyler | 1 | 16 April 1983 | 1 |
| 16 April 1983 | 2 | Live! | The Kids from "Fame" | 8 | 16 April 1983 | 1 |
| 23 April 1983 | 18 | Let's Dance | David Bowie | 1 | 23 April 1983 | 3 |
| 30 April 1983 | 2 | White Feathers | Kajagoogoo | 5 | 30 April 1983 | 1 |
| 30 April 1983 | 3 | Cargo | Men at Work | 8 | 30 April 1983 | 1 |
| 7 May 1983 | 11 | The Luxury Gap | Heaven 17 | 4 | 7 May 1983 | 2 |
| 7 May 1983 | 2 | Midnight at the Lost and Found | Meat Loaf | 7 | 7 May 1983 | 1 |
| 14 May 1983 | 2 | Power, Corruption & Lies | New Order | 4 | 14 May 1983 | 1 |
| 14 May 1983 | 2 | Night Dubbing | Imagination | 9 | 14 May 1983 | 2 |
| 21 May 1983 | 2 | Dressed for the Occasion | Cliff Richard | 7 | 21 May 1983 | 1 |
| 28 May 1983 | 3 | Piece of Mind | Iron Maiden | 3 | 28 May 1983 | 1 |
| 28 May 1983 | 6 | Twice As Kool (The Hits of Kool & the Gang) | Kool & the Gang | 4 | 4 June 1983 | 3 |
| 28 May 1983 | 3 | Chart Encounters of the Hit Kind | Various artists | 5 | 11 June 1983 | 1 |
| 28 May 1983 | 3 | Confrontation | Bob Marley & the Wailers | 5 | 4 June 1983 | 1 |
| 4 June 1983 | 7 | Crises | Mike Oldfield | 6 | 2 July 1983 | 1 |
| 11 June 1983 | 6 | Too Low for Zero | Elton John | 7 | 18 June 1983 | 2 |
| 18 June 1983 | 5 | In Your Eyes | George Benson | 3 | 18 June 1983 | 1 |
| 18 June 1983 | 2 | Oil on Canvas | Japan | 5 | 18 June 1983 | 1 |
| 18 June 1983 | 1 | Plays Live | Peter Gabriel | 8 | 18 June 1983 | 1 |
| 18 June 1983 | 1 | What Is Beat? – The Best of The Beat | The Beat | 10 | 18 June 1983 | 1 |
| 25 June 1983 | 8 | Synchronicity | The Police | 1 | 25 June 1983 | 2 |
| 25 June 1983 | 4 | Body Wishes | Rod Stewart | 5 | 25 June 1983 | 3 |
| 25 June 1983 | 1 | Chart Stars | Various artists | 7 | 25 June 1983 | 1 |
| 2 July 1983 | 2 | Secret Messages | Electric Light Orchestra | 4 | 2 July 1983 | 1 |
| 9 July 1983 | 20 | Fantastic | Wham! | 1 | 9 July 1983 | 2 |
| 9 July 1983 | 4 | Julio | Julio Iglesias | 5 | 16 July 1983 | 1 |
| 16 July 1983 | 6 | You and Me Both | Yazoo | 1 | 23 July 1983 | 2 |
| 16 July 1983 | 2 | Flashdance: Original Soundtrack from the Motion Picture | Various artists | 9 | 16 July 1983 | 2 |
| 23 July 1983 | 4 | The Principle of Moments | Robert Plant | 7 | 20 August 1983 | 1 |
| 30 July 1983 | 9 | The Very Best of The Beach Boys | The Beach Boys | 1 | 6 August 1983 | 3 |
| 30 July 1983 | 31 | No Parlez | Paul Young | 1 | 17 September 1983 | 5 |
| 30 July 1983 | 2 | The Look | Shalamar | 7 | 30 July 1983 | 1 |
| 30 July 1983 | 9 | 18 Greatest Hits | Michael Jackson and The Jackson 5 | 1 | 20 August 1983 | 3 |
| 6 August 1983 | 14 | The Crossing | Big Country | 3 | 24 September 1983 | 3 |
| 13 August 1983 | 3 | Punch the Clock | Elvis Costello and The Attractions | 3 | 13 August 1983 | 1 |
| 20 August 1983 | 2 | Alpha | Asia | 5 | 20 August 1983 | 1 |
| 3 September 1983 | 2 | Flick of the Switch | AC/DC | 4 | 3 September 1983 | 1 |
| 3 September 1983 | 3 | Construction Time Again | Depeche Mode | 6 | 3 September 1983 | 1 |
| 3 September 1983 | 3 | Standing in the Light | Level 42 | 9 | 3 September 1983 | 2 |
| 17 September 1983 | 2 | Headline Hits | Various artists | 5 | 17 September 1983 | 1 |
| 24 September 1983 | 9 | Labour of Love | UB40 | 1 | 24 September 1983 | 1 |
| 24 September 1983 | 2 | Born Again | Black Sabbath | 4 | 24 September 1983 | 1 |
| 1 October 1983 | 2 | The Hit Squad - Chart Tracking | Various artists | 4 | 1 October 1983 | 1 |
| 1 October 1983 | 2 | Unforgettable – A Musical Tribute to Nat King Cole | Johnny Mathis and Natalie Cole | 5 | 1 October 1983 | 1 |
| 8 October 1983 | 1 | Lick It Up | Kiss | 7 | 8 October 1983 | 1 |
| 15 October 1983 | 9 | Genesis | Genesis | 1 | 15 October 1983 | 1 |
| 15 October 1983 | 2 | Silver | Cliff Richard | 7 | 15 October 1983 | 1 |
| 15 October 1983 | 1 | A Touch More Magic | Barry Manilow | 10 | 15 October 1983 | 1 |
| 22 October 1983 | 17 | Colour by Numbers | Culture Club | 1 | 22 October 1983 | 5 |
| 22 October 1983 | 4 | Snap! | The Jam | 2 | 22 October 1983 | 2 |
| 22 October 1983 | 4 | Voice of the Heart | The Carpenters | 6 | 22 October 1983 | 2 |
| 29 October 1983 | 49 | Can't Slow Down | Lionel Richie | 1 | 12 November 1983 | 3 |
| 29 October 1983 | 4 | The Two of Us | Various artists | 3 | 12 November 1983 | 1 |
| 29 October 1983 | 1 | Monument: The Soundtrack | Ultravox | 9 | 29 October 1983 | 1 |
| 29 October 1983 | 1 | North of a Miracle | Nick Heyward | 10 | 29 October 1983 | 1 |
| 12 November 1983 | 7 | Pipes of Peace | Paul McCartney | 4 | 12 November 1983 | 2 |
| 12 November 1983 | 1 | Infidels | Bob Dylan | 9 | 12 November 1983 | 1 |
| 19 November 1983 | 2 | Undercover | The Rolling Stones | 3 | 19 November 1983 | 1 |
| 19 November 1983 | 33 | An Innocent Man ♦ | Billy Joel | 2 | 23 June 1984 | 1 |
| 26 November 1983 | 7 | Stages | Elaine Paige | 2 | 10 December 1983 | 1 |
| 26 November 1983 | 2 | Chart Hits '83 | Various artists | 6 | 26 November 1983 | 1 |
| 26 November 1983 | 11 | Touch ♦ | Eurythmics | 1 | 4 February 1984 | 2 |
| 3 December 1983 | 5 | Seven and the Ragged Tiger | Duran Duran | 1 | 3 December 1983 | 1 |
| 3 December 1983 | 8 | Under a Blood Red Sky | U2 | 2 | 3 December 1983 | 1 |
| 3 December 1983 | 1 | Back to Back | Status Quo | 9 | 3 December 1983 | 1 |
| 10 December 1983 | 11 | Now That's What I Call Music! | Various artists | 1 | 17 December 1983 | 5 |
| 17 December 1983 | 4 | Chas'n'Dave's Knees Up Jamboree Bag No. 2 | Chas & Dave | 7 | 24 December 1983 | 2 |
| 24 December 1983 | 2 | Formula 30 | Various artists | 6 | 24 December 1983 | 2 |

== See also ==
- 1983 in British music
- List of number-one albums from the 1980s (UK)
