= Carlo Imperato =

American film, stage and television actor

- Imperato (right) with Nia Peeples, 1986
- Born: Anthony Richard Imperato; August 3, 1963 (age 63); The Bronx, New York, U.S.
- Occupations: Film, stage and television actor

Anthony Richard Imperato (born August 3, 1963) is an American film, stage and television actor. He is best known for playing Danny Amatullo in the American musical drama television series Fame.

== Life and career ==
Imperato was born in The Bronx, New York. His father worked at the Bronx Terminal Market, and his mother worked as a secretary at the Albert Einstein Medical College. According to the Staten Island Advance, he holds a BA degree. He began his stage career in 1978, appearing in the stage play Runaways. He then began his screen career in 1979, appearing in the ABC sitcom television series Angie. In the same year, he appeared in the television film The Man in the Santa Claus Suit.

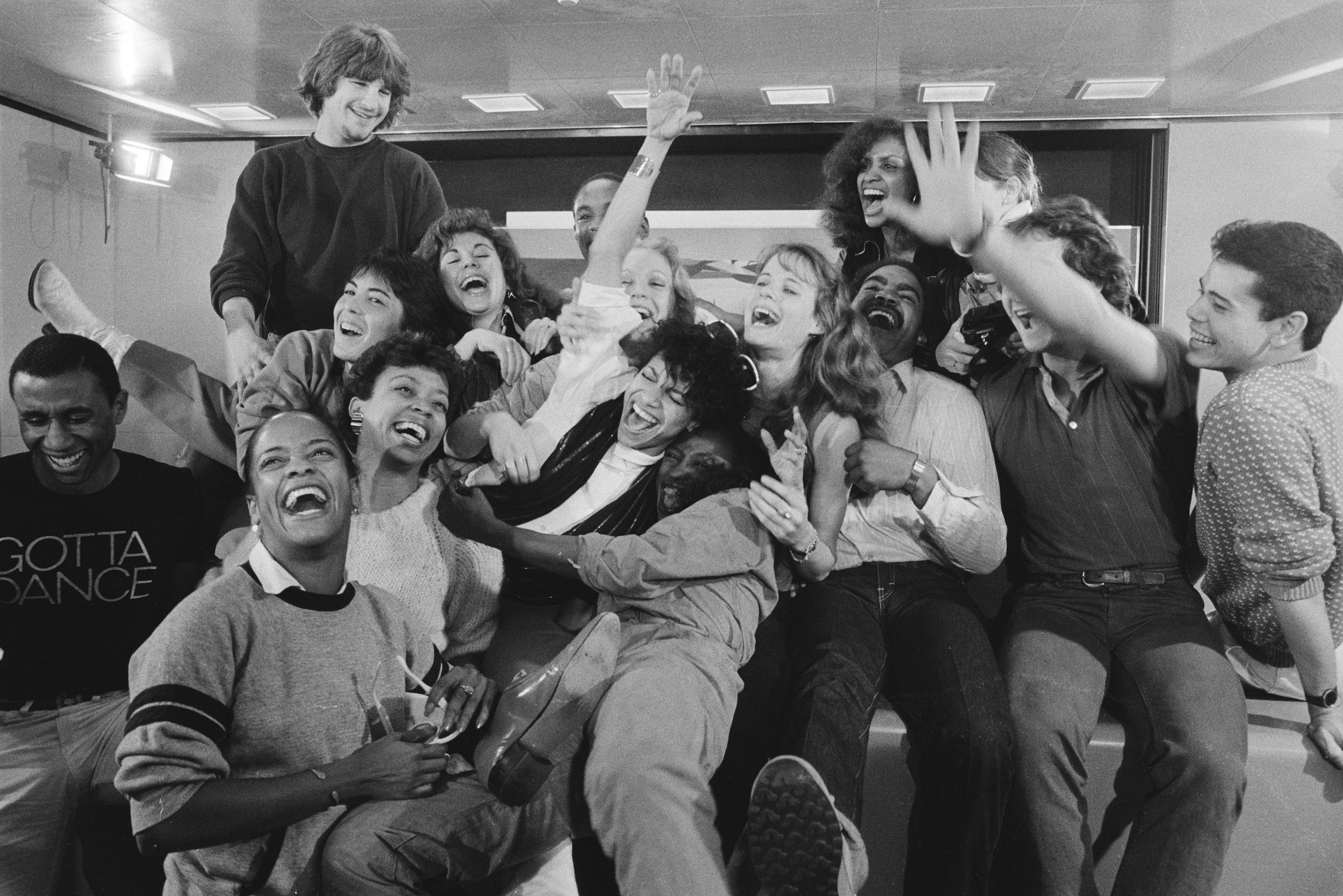
Imperato (top right) with The Kids from "Fame", 1983

Later in his career, in 1982, Imperato starred as Danny Amatullo in the syndicated musical drama television series Fame, starring along with Debbie Allen, Lee Curreri, Albert Hague, Carol Mayo Jenkins, Valerie Landsburg and Gene Anthony Ray. After the series ended in 1987, he played Tony in the stage play West Side Story in Fort Lauderdale, Florida. He guest-starred in television programs including Joanie Loves Chachi, Friends, True Blue and Oh Baby. He also appeared in films such as Crazylove and Out-of-Sync.

Imperato retired from acting in 2015, last appearing in the ABC medical drama television series Grey's Anatomy.
