= List of UK top-ten albums in 1982 =

The UK Albums Chart is one of many music charts compiled by the Official Charts Company that calculates the best-selling albums of the week in the United Kingdom. Before 2004, the chart was only based on the sales of physical albums. This list shows albums that peaked in the top ten of the UK Albums Chart during 1982, as well as albums which peaked in 1981 and 1983 but were in the top ten in 1982. The entry date is when the album appeared in the top ten for the first time (week ending, as published by the Official Charts Company, which is six days after the chart is announced).

The first new number-one album of the year was by Love Songs by Barbra Streisand. Overall, fourteen different albums peaked at number one in 1982, with thirteen unique artists and one soundtrack album hitting that position.

== Top-ten albums ==
Key

Symbol	Meaning
‡	Album peaked in 1981 but still in chart in 1982.
♦	Album released in 1982 but peaked in 1983.
Entered	The date that the album first appeared in the chart.
Peak	Highest position that the album reached in the UK Albums Chart.

Entered (week ending)	Weeks in top 10	Single	Artist	Peak	Peak reached (week ending)	Weeks at peak
Albums in 1981
16 May 1981	8	Chariots of Fire ‡	Vangelis	5	13 May 1981	1
4 July 1981	13	Love Songs ‡	Cliff Richard	1	11 July 1981	5
12 September 1981	10	Dead Ringer ‡	Meat Loaf	1	12 September 1981	2
26 September 1981	7	Wired for Sound ‡	Cliff Richard	4	3 October 1981	1
10 October 1981	13	Ghost in the Machine ‡	The Police	1	10 October 1981	3
10 October 1981	22	Dare ‡	The Human League	1	10 October 1981	4
31 October 1981	10	The Best of Blondie ‡	Blondie	4	31 October 1981	1
7 November 1981	14	Greatest Hits ‡	Queen	1	14 November 1981	4
14 November 1981	10	Prince Charming ‡	Adam and the Ants	2	14 November 1981	3
14 November 1981	14	Architecture & Morality ‡	Orchestral Manoeuvres in the Dark	3	21 November 1981	2
28 November 1981	8	Chart Hits '81 ‡	Various artists	1	12 December 1981	1
28 November 1981	18	Pearls	Elkie Brooks	2	13 February 1982	2
28 November 1981	7	Begin the Beguine	Julio Iglesias	5	3 April 1982	1
5 December 1981	5	The Simon and Garfunkel Collection: 17 of Their All-Time Greatest Recordings ‡	Simon & Garfunkel	4	12 December 1981	1
19 December 1981	7	The Visitors ‡	ABBA	1	19 December 1981	3
Albums in 1982
9 January 1982	4	Hits Hits Hits	Various artists	2	23 January 1982	1
23 January 1982	16	Love Songs	Barbra Streisand	1	30 January 1982	9
23 January 1982	3	Modern Dance	Various artists	6	23 January 1982	1
23 January 1982	5	4	Foreigner	5	6 February 1982	2
30 January 1982	2	Something Special	Kool & the Gang	10	30 January 1982	2
6 February 1982	4	The Friends of Mr Cairo	Jon and Vangelis	6	13 February 1982	2
13 February 1982	6	Non-Stop Erotic Cabaret	Soft Cell	5	20 February 1982	2
13 February 1982	9	All for a Song	Barbara Dickson	3	27 March 1982	1
13 February 1982	2	The Man-Machine	Kraftwerk	9	20 February 1982	1
20 February 1982	1	Mechanix	UFO	8	20 February 1982	1
27 February 1982	4	Dreaming	Various artists	2	27 February 1982	1
27 February 1982	2	English Settlement	XTC	5	27 February 1982	1
27 February 1982	1	Private Eyes	Hall & Oates	8	27 February 1982	1
6 March 1982	4	Star Trax	Various artists	2	6 March 1982	1
6 March 1982	11	Pelican West	Haircut 100	2	13 March 1982	3
13 March 1982	2	One Night at Budokan	Michael Schenker Group	5	13 March 1982	1
20 March 1982	5	The Gift	The Jam	1	20 March 1982	1
20 March 1982	3	Fun Boy Three	Fun Boy Three	7	20 March 1982	2
27 March 1982	2	Keep Fit and Dance	Peter Powell	9	27 March 1982	2
3 April 1982	2	The Anvil	Visage	6	3 April 1982	1
3 April 1982	3	Five Miles Out	Mike Oldfield	7	3 April 1982	1
10 April 1982	9	The Number of the Beast	Iron Maiden	1	10 April 1982	2
10 April 1982	3	James Bond Greatest Hits	Various artists	4	10 April 1982	2
10 April 1982	4	Sky 4: Forthcoming	Sky	7	10 April 1982	2
17 April 1982	2	Iron Fist	Motörhead	6	17 April 1982	1
17 April 1982	2	Portrait	The Nolans	7	17 April 1982	1
24 April 1982	3	1+9+8+2	Status Quo	1	24 April 1982	1
24 April 1982	2	Straight Between the Eyes	Rainbow	5	24 April 1982	1
1 May 1982	7	Barry Live in Britain	Barry Manilow	1	1 May 1982	1
1 May 1982	19	Complete Madness	Madness	1	22 May 1982	3
1 May 1982	2	Shape Up and Dance Volume 2	Angela Rippon	8	8 May 1982	1
8 May 1982	5	Tug of War	Paul McCartney	1	8 May 1982	2
8 May 1982	1	Disco UK and Disco USA	Various artists	7	8 May 1982	1
15 May 1982	3	Hot Space	Queen	4	15 May 1982	1
15 May 1982	7	Night Birds	Shakatak	4	5 June 1982	1
15 May 1982	1	The Concerts in China	Jean-Michel Jarre	6	15 May 1982	1
15 May 1982	1	Pornography	The Cure	8	15 May 1982	1
15 May 1982	1	Are You Ready	Bucks Fizz	10	15 May 1982	1
22 May 1982	2	Combat Rock	The Clash	2	22 May 1982	1
22 May 1982	25	Rio	Duran Duran	2	29 May 1982	1
22 May 1982	3	Chartbusters '82	Various artists	3	29 May 1982	1
22 May 1982	2	The Eagle Has Landed	Saxon	5	29 May 1982	1
22 May 1982	1	Sulk	The Associates	10	22 May 1982	1
5 June 1982	11	Avalon	Roxy Music	1	5 June 1982	3
5 June 1982	2	The Hunter	Blondie	9	5 June 1982	2
5 June 1982	11	Tropical Gangsters	Kid Creole and the Coconuts	3	28 August 1982	1
12 June 1982	4	Three Sides Live	Genesis	2	12 June 1982	3
12 June 1982	8	Still Life (American Concert 1981)	The Rolling Stones	4	19 June 1982	3
12 June 1982	2	Stevie Wonder's Original Musiquarium I	Stevie Wonder	8	12 June 1982	1
19 June 1982	3	The Changeling	Toyah	6	19 June 1982	1
19 June 1982	2	Windsong	Randy Crawford	7	19 June 1982	1
26 June 1982	2	Non Stop Ecstatic Dancing (EP)	Soft Cell	6	3 July 1982	1
3 July 1982	16	The Lexicon of Love	ABC	1	3 July 1982	4
3 July 1982	1	Fabrique	Fashion	10	3 July 1982	1
10 July 1982	4	Pictures at Eleven	Robert Plant	2	10 July 1982	2
10 July 1982	5	Mirage	Fleetwood Mac	5	10 July 1982	1
10 July 1982	2	Imperial Bedroom	Elvis Costello and The Attractions	6	10 July 1982	1
10 July 1982	1	Overload	Various artists	10	10 July 1982	1
17 July 1982	9	Love and Dancing	The League Unlimited Orchestra	3	24 July 1982	2
17 July 1982	7	Fame: The Original Soundtrack from the Motion Picture	Various artists	1	24 July 1982	2
17 July 1982	1	Abracadabra	Steve Miller Band	10	17 July 1982	1
24 July 1982	3	The Concert in Central Park	Simon & Garfunkel	6	24 July 1982	1
31 July 1982	24	The Kids from "Fame"	The Kids from "Fame"	1	7 August 1982	12
7 August 1982	8	Too-Rye-Ay	Dexys Midnight Runners	2	7 August 1982	4
14 August 1982	3	Talking Back to the Night	Steve Winwood	6	14 August 1982	1
21 August 1982	4	Love Songs	Commodores	5	28 August 1982	1
4 September 1982	8	Upstairs at Eric's	Yazoo	2	4 September 1982	3
4 September 1982	2	Now You See Me, Now You Don't	Cliff Richard	4	4 September 1982	1
11 September 1982	3	Breakout	Various artists	4	18 September 1982	1
11 September 1982	4	In the Heat of the Night	Imagination	7	25 September 1982	1
18 September 1982	2	Signals	Rush	3	18 September 1982	1
18 September 1982	1	Peter Gabriel 4 (Security)	Peter Gabriel	6	18 September 1982	1
18 September 1982	4	Chart Beat/Chart Heat	Various artists	2	25 September 1982	1
18 September 1982	1	I, Assassin	Gary Numan	8	18 September 1982	1
25 September 1982	2	The Dreaming	Kate Bush	3	25 September 1982	1
25 September 1982	3	New Gold Dream (81–82–83–84)	Simple Minds	3	2 October 1982	1
2 October 1982	7	Love over Gold	Dire Straits	1	2 October 1982	4
2 October 1982	3	Nebraska	Bruce Springsteen	3	9 October 1982	1
9 October 1982	2	UB44	UB40	4	9 October 1982	2
9 October 1982	2	A Broken Frame	Depeche Mode	8	16 October 1982	1
16 October 1982	3	Give Me Your Heart Tonight	Shakin' Stevens	3	16 October 1982	1
16 October 1982	7	Reflections	Various artists	4	23 October 1982	2
23 October 1982	5	The Kids from "Fame" Again	The Kids from "Fame"	2	30 October 1982	2
23 October 1982	2	Friend or Foe	Adam Ant	5	23 October 1982	1
23 October 1982	1	Quartet	Ultravox	6	23 October 1982	1
23 October 1982	1	Chart Attack	Various artists	7	23 October 1982	1
23 October 1982	5	Kissing to Be Clever	Culture Club	5	30 October 1982	2
30 October 1982	2	The Sky's Gone Out	Bauhaus	4	30 October 1982	1
6 November 1982	3	...Famous Last Words...	Supertramp	6	6 November 1982	1
6 November 1982	3	Singles – 45's and Under	Squeeze	3	13 November 1982	1
6 November 1982	4	Olivia's Greatest Hits ♦	Olivia Newton-John	8	15 January 1983	2
6 November 1982	1	20 Greatest Hits	The Beatles	10	6 November 1982	1
13 November 1982	11	Hello, I Must Be Going!	Phil Collins	2	13 November 1982	2
13 November 1982	15	Heartbreaker	Dionne Warwick	3	20 November 1982	2
13 November 1982	8	From the Makers of...	Status Quo	4	27 November 1982	1
20 November 1982	9	The Singles: The First Ten Years	ABBA	1	27 November 1982	1
20 November 1982	2	The Rise & Fall	Madness	10	20 November 1982	2
27 November 1982	2	I Wanna Do It With You	Barry Manilow	7	27 November 1982	1
27 November 1982	1	Saints & Sinners	Whitesnake	9	27 November 1982	1
27 November 1982	1	Midnight Love	Marvin Gaye	10	27 November 1982	1
4 December 1982	14	The John Lennon Collection	John Lennon	1	4 December 1982	6
4 December 1982	2	Coda	Led Zeppelin	4	4 December 1982	1
4 December 1982	6	Pearls II	Elkie Brooks	5	11 December 1982	1
4 December 1982	5	20 Greatest Love Songs	Nat King Cole	7	4 December 1982	4
11 December 1982	5	Love Songs	Diana Ross	5	25 December 1982	1
18 December 1982	3	Dig the New Breed	The Jam	2	18 December 1982	1

== See also ==
- 1982 in British music
- List of number-one albums from the 1980s (UK)
