= Fame: The Musical (Irish TV series) =

- Created by: Robert C. Kelly
- Presented by: Derek Mooney
- Judges: Robert C Kelly; Erica Gimpel; Simon Delaney; Jacinta Whyte
- Country of origin: Ireland
- Original language: English
- No. of series: 1
- No. of episodes: 10

Production
- Executive producer: Larry Bass
- Running time: Varies

Original release
- Network: RTÉ One
- Release: 11 April – 13 June 2010

Fame: The Musical is a singing and dance contest in Ireland, produced by Screentime ShinAwiL for RTÉ. The audition and Fame Bootcamp stages were filmed around Ireland and in London.

The shows aim was to find actors for the parts of "Nick" and "Serena" for the highly successful stage production of Fame. On 13 June 2010 it was announced that Ben Morris would play the part of Nick and Jessica Cervi would play the part of Serena in the Irish tour of Fame.

== Personnel ==
Judges

Judge	Note
Robert C Kelly	Producer of Fame seeking an actor & actress to play Nick & Serena
Erica Gimpel	Present for the live shows only. Starred in the subsequent TV series
Simon Delaney	Irish television and theatre director
Jacinta Whyte	Judge for the auditions and final only. Vocal coach Live Show 6

Host

Derek Mooney

== The Show ==
=== Results summary ===
Colour key:

—N/a	Indicates that the contestant did not perform and was immune from the vote
	Contestant was safe.
	Contestant was in the bottom two and had to sing again in the final duet
	Contestant was in the bottom two and was immediately eliminated (no judges' vote)

Contestant	Live Show 1	Live Show 2	Live Show 3	Live Show 4	Live Show 5	Live Show 6	Semi-Final	Final
Jessica Cervi	Safe	—N/a	Safe	Safe	Safe	Safe	Safe	Serena
Ben Morris	Safe	—N/a	Safe	Bottom two	Safe	Safe	Safe	Nick
Séan Carey	—N/a	Safe	Safe	Safe	Safe	Safe	Safe	Runners Up
Sarah O'Conner	Bottom two	—N/a	Bottom two	Safe	Safe	Bottom two	Safe	Runners Up
Roísín Magee	Safe	—N/a	Safe	Safe	Safe	Safe	Bottom two	Eliminated (Semi-final)
Michael Joseph	—N/a	Safe	Safe	Safe	Safe	Safe	Bottom two	Eliminated (Semi-final)
Conleth Kane	—N/a	Bottom two	Safe	Safe	Bottom two	Bottom two	Eliminated (Week 6)	
Caoimhe Garvey	—N/a	Safe	Safe	Safe	Bottom two	Eliminated (Week 5)		
Hollie O'Donoghue	—N/a	Safe	Safe	Bottom two	Eliminated (Week 4)			
Stuart Pollock	Safe	—N/a	Bottom two	Eliminated (Week 3)				
Philomena Fitzpatrick	—N/a	Bottom two	Eliminated (Week 2)					
Drew Millar	Bottom two	Eliminated (Week 1)						
Final Duet	Drew	Philomena	Stuart	Hollie	Caoimhe	Conleth	No judges' vote or final duet; public votes alone decide who is eliminated and who ultimately wins	
Final Duet	Sarah	Conleth	Sarah	Ben	Conleth	Sarah	No judges' vote or final duet; public votes alone decide who is eliminated and who ultimately wins	
Simon's vote to save	Drew Miller	Conleth Kane	Sarah O'Conner	Ben Morris	Conleth Kane	Sarah O'Conner	No judges' vote or final duet; public votes alone decide who is eliminated and who ultimately wins	
Erica's vote to save	Sarah O'Conner	Conleth Kane	Sarah O'Conner	Ben Morris	N/A	Sarah O'Conner	No judges' vote or final duet; public votes alone decide who is eliminated and who ultimately wins	
Robert's vote to save	Sarah O Conner	Conleth Kane	Stuart Pollock	N/A	Conleth Kane	Conleth Kane	No judges' vote or final duet; public votes alone decide who is eliminated and who ultimately wins	
Eliminated	Drew; 1 of 3 votes	Philomena; 0 of 3 votes	Stuart; 1 of 3 votes	Hollie; 0 of 2 votes	Caoimhe; 0 of 2 votes	Conleth; 1 of 3 votes	Michael	Sarah & Séan
Eliminated	Drew; 1 of 3 votes	Philomena; 0 of 3 votes	Stuart; 1 of 3 votes	Hollie; 0 of 2 votes	Caoimhe; 0 of 2 votes	Conleth; 1 of 3 votes	Roísín	Ben & Jessica

=== Episode 1 ===
Judges Robert C Kelly, Simon Delaney and Jacinta Whyte travel around Ireland looking for the next "Nick" and "Serena". 53 were chosen to go on to the Fame Bootcamp.

=== Episode 2 ===
A group of young singers, actors and dancers attend The Fame Bootcamp. The three judges choose 12 to go forward for the live shows. Stuart Pollock, Ben Morris, Michael Joseph, Conleth Kane, Drew Millar and Séan Carey will battle it out for the role of "Nick", while Jessica Cervi, Philomena Fitzpatrick, Sarah O'Connor, Caoimhe Garvey, Hollie O'Donoghue and Susan Hall will audition for the role of "Serena". Susan Hall turn down the opportunity to audition for the role at the last minute leaving the 6th and final contestant to be revealed on the night of the first Live show.

=== Live Show 1 ===
Erica Gimpel replaced Jacinta Whyte and joined Simon and Robert for the live shows as a judge at the Helix. As Susan Hall dropped out in episode 2 the judges choose Róisín Magee to replace her.

- Theme: Songs from musicals
- Group performances: Fame and Starmaker (led by Drew)

Contestants' performances on the first live show
Performer	Order	Song	Musical	Result
Róisín Magee	1	"Maybe This Time"	Cabaret	Safe
Stuart Pollock	2	Lady's Choice	Hairspray	Safe
Drew Millar	3	Empty Chairs and Empty Table	Les Misérables	Eliminated
Jessica Cervi	4	I Can Hear The Bells	Hairspray	Safe
Ben Morris	5	Who I'd Be	Shrek the Musical	Safe
Sarah O'Connor	6	Don't Rain on My Parade	Funny Girl	Bottom two

Final duet details
Performers	Song	Eliminated
Sarah & Drew	Let's Play A Love Scene	Drew

Judges' vote to save

- Gimpel: Sarah O'Connor - thought that Sarah had performed better
- Delaney: Drew Millar - avoided being parochial
- Kelly: Sarah O'Connor - thought it would be unfair to keep Drew in a competition that he couldn't win.

=== Live Show 2 ===
Michael Joseph, Conleth Kane, Séan Carey, Philomena Fitzpatrick, Caoimhe Garvey and Hollie O'Donoghue all take to the stage for the first time.

- Theme: Songs from musicals
- Group performances: Fame and Starmaker (lead by Philomena )

Contestants' performances on the second live show
Performer	Order	Song	Musical	Result
Conleth Kane	1	The Winner Takes It All	Mamma Mia!	Bottom two
Caoimhe Garvey	2	Let's Hear It for the Boy	Footloose	Safe
Hollie O'Donoghue	3	Astonishing	Little Women	Safe
Séan Carey	4	Ain't That a Kick in the Head?	Fools Rush In	Safe
Michael Joseph	5	Somewhere	West Side Story	Safe
Philomena Fitzpatrick	6	The Diva's Lament (Whatever Happened To My Part?)	Monty Python's Spamalot	Eliminated

Final duet details
Performers	Song	Eliminated
Philomena & Conleth	Let's Play A Love Scene	Philomena

Judges' vote to save

- Kelly: Conleth Kane - based it on the whole rehearsals and live shows but ultimately on the final duet
- Gimpel: Conleth Kane - already stated she had had issues with Philomena's pitching
- Delaney; Conleth Kane - based it on the final duet

=== Live Show 3 ===
- Group performances:Circle of Life (The Lion King) and Starmaker (lead by Stuart.)

Contestants' performances on the third live show
Performer	Order	Song	Result
Hollie O'Donoghue	1	Never Forget You	Safe
Sarah O'Connor	2	Chasing Cars	Bottom two
Michael Joseph	3	Viva la Vida	Safe
Stuart Pollock	4	Shine	Eliminated
Séan Carey	5	Fight for this Love	Safe
Caoimhe Garvey	6	Put Your Records On	Safe
Conleth Kane	7	Broken Strings	Safe
Jessica Cervi	8	Cry Me Out	Safe
Ben Morris	9	Breakeven	Safe
Róisín Magee	10	Rain on Your Parade	Safe

Final duet details
Performers	Song	Eliminated
Stuart & Sarah	Let's Play A Love Scene	Stuart

- As the results were called out by Derek Mooney mistakenly saved Stuart only to have stop the show the let the audience know that he had made a mistake and that Conleth had been saved by the public vote.

Judges' vote to save

- Kelly: Stuart Pollock - gave no reason
- Gimpel: Sarah O'Conner - gave no reason
- Delaney: Sarah O'Conner - gave no reason

=== Live Show 4 ===
- Group performances: One Voice (Barry Manilow) and Starmaker (lead by Hollie).

Contestants' performances on the fourth live show
Performer	Order	Song	Musical	Result
Michael Joseph	1	Cabaret	Cabarat	Safe
Róisín Magee	2	I Cain't Say No	Oklahoma!	Safe
Conleth Kane	3	Some Enchanted Evening	South Pacific	Safe
Hollie O'Donoghue	4	Wherever He Ain't	Mack & Mabel	Eliminated
Caoimhe Garvey	5	There's Gotta Be Something Better Than This	Sweet Charity	Safe
Ben Morris	6	If I Loved You	Carousel	Bottom two
Sarah O'Conner	7	My Funny Valentine	Babes in Arms	Safe
Séan Carey	8	Miracle of Miracles	Fiddler on the Roof	Safe
Jessica Cervi	9	Can't Help Lovin' Dat Man	Show Boat	Safe

Final duet details
Performers	Song	Eliminated
Ben & Hollie	Let's Play A Love Scene	Hollie

Judges' vote to save

- Gimpel: Ben Morris - stated that Ben "put his heart on the stage"
- Delaney: Ben Morris - stated that it was a difficult choice
- Kelly: was not required to vote as the judges reached a majority verdict but commended both contestants.

=== Live Show 5 ===
- Group performance: "A Star Is Born" and "Starmaker" (lead by Caoimhe)

Contestants' performances on the fifth live show
Performer	Order	Song	Result
Conleth Kane	1	Dancin' Fool	Bottom two
Jessica Cervi	2	At Last	Safe
Caoimhe Garvey	3	Sway	Eliminated
Michael Joseph	4	Secret Love	Safe
Sarah O'Connor	5	Nobody Does It Like Me	Safe
Séan Carey	6	The Lady Is a Tramp	Safe
Róisín Magee	7	Life is Just a Bowl of Cherries	Safe
Ben Morris	8	Cry Me a River	Safe

Final duet details
Performers	Song	Eliminated
Conleth & Caoimhe	Let's Play A Love Scene	Caoimhe

Judges' vote to save

- Delaney : Conleth Kane - gave no reason
- Kelly : Conleth Kane - gave no reason
- Gimpel: was not required to vote as the verdict was already declared but said that Caoimhe could hold her head high for getting this far

=== Live Show 6 ===
- Theme: Judges Choice
- Group performance: Starmaker (lead by Conleth)
- Vocal coach: Jancinta Whyte.

Contestants' performances on the sixth live show
Performer	Order	Song	Introduced by	Result
Séan Carey	1	Footloose	Simon	Safe
Ben Morris	2	Home	Erica	Safe
Róisín Magee	3	As Long as He Needs Me	Robert	Safe
Conleth Kane	4	Maria	Erica	Eliminated
Sarah O'Connor	5	Defying Gravity	Simon	Bottom two
Jessica Cervi	6	When You Got It, Flaunt It	Erica	Safe
Michael Joseph	7	The Impossible Dream	Robert	Safe

Final duet details
Performers	Song	Eliminated
Conleth & Sarah	Let's Play A Love Scene	Conleth

Judges' vote to save

- Gimpel: Sarah O'Connor - said Conleth grew right throughout the series
- Kelly: Conleth Kane - said he had always praised both Conleth and Sarah
- Delaney: Sarah O'Connor - stated it was "an impossible choice" and there was nothing between them

=== Semi-final ===
- Theme: Contestants Choice
- Group performance: One Night Only and Starmaker (lead by Michael & Roísín)
- Vocal Coach: Erica Gimpel

Contestants' performances on the semi-final
Performer	Order	Song	Result
Ben Morris	1	Somebody to Love	Safe
Róisín Magee	2	Out Here on My Own	Eliminated
Michael Joseph	3	Come What May	Eliminated
Sarah O'Connor	4	Memory	Safe
Jessica Cervi	5	And I Am Telling You I'm Not Going	Safe
Séan Carey	6	This is the Moment	Safe

- Two acts were eliminated from the semi-final (one boy & one girl) and for the first time in the series, there was no final duet. The three remaining girls were brought out first and Róisín Magee was voted out by public vote. Then the three remaining boys were brought out and Michael Joseph was voted out by the public. After the announcements, Róisín and Michael bid farewell by leading a group performance of "Starmaker".

=== Final ===
- Jacinta Whyte returned and joined Robert, Erica and Simon for the final show.
- Themes: Westend Duet; Contestants favorite performance
- Group performances;
  - Group 1 (Eliminated Contestants) - "Don't Stop Believin'"
  - Group 2 (Finalists) - "The Time of My Life"
- Duet performances:
  - Noel Sullivan with Sarah O'Conner/Jessica Cervi
  - Susan McFadden with Séan Carey/Ben Morris

Contestants' performances on the final show
Performer	First Song	Second song	Result
Sarah O'Connor	Don't Rain on My Parade (Week 1)	Suddenly, Seymour (duet with Noel)	Runner-Up
Ben Morris	Can You Feel the Love Tonight (duet with Susan)	Cry Me a River (Week 5)	Nick
Jessica Cervi	You're the One that I Want (duet with Noel)	At Last (Week 5)	Serena
Séan Carey	Fight for this Love (Week 3)	Smile (duet with Susan)	Runner-Up

- All the finalists returned to the stage and Derek Mooney announced Ben & Jessica as the winners of the parts of Nick & Serena respectively. Ben & Jessica then closed the series with a performance of Let's Play A Love Scene.

== Reception ==
The Evening Herald gave the show 3 out of 5 stars stating "The show has been criticised for putting the vote to the public, hence turning what should be a talent contest into a popularity contest. However, there's no doubt that the biggest voices in the competition made it to the final last night. Yes, it was cheesy and over-sentimental, but Fame: The Musical was the type of show that many tuned into in spite of themselves".

Audience figures were below that of previous RTÉ reality talent shows, however the final was watched by over 500,000 viewers.

== Finalists ==
Twelve contestants made it through the audition rounds and performed during the live shows.

=== The Boys ===
Finalist	Age*	From	Status
Ben Morris	23	Tallaght, Dublin	Nick
Séan Carey	18	Dunshaughlin, County Meath	Runner-up
Michael Joseph	26	Waterford	Third Place
Conleth Kane	26	Lurgan, County Armagh	Eliminated (Week 6)
Stuart Pollock	20	Rathgar, Dublin	Eliminated (Week 3)
Drew Millar	22	Glasgow, Scotland	Eliminated (Week 1)

* at the start of the series

=== The Girls ===
Finalist	Age*	From	Status
Jessica Cervi	19	East Wall, Dublin	Serena
Sarah O'Connor	20	Lucan, Dublin	Runner-up
Róisín Magee	24	Newry, County Down	Third Place
Caoimhe Garvey	19	Tralee, County Kerry	Eliminated (Week 5)
Hollie O'Donoghue	21	Limerick	Eliminated (Week 4)
Philomena Fitzpatrick	22	Ballybrack, Dublin	Eliminated (Week 2)
Susan Hall			Withdrew

* at the start of the series

== See also ==
- You're a Star
- The All Ireland Talent Show
- Popstars
