= Starmaker (song) =

1977 song by Bruce Roberts

Single by the Kids from "Fame"

from the album The Kids from "Fame"
- B-side: "I Can Do Anything Better Than You Can" (US); "Step Up to the Mike" (UK)
- Released: March 1982
- Genre: Pop
- Length: 3:35
- Label: RCA
- Songwriters: Bruce Roberts; Carole Bayer Sager
- Producer: Barry Fasman

The Kids from "Fame" singles chronology
"Hi-Fidelity" (1982)	"Starmaker" (1982)	"Mannequin" (1982)

"Starmaker" is a song written by Bruce Roberts and Carole Bayer Sager for Roberts' self-titled album in 1977. It was later popularized in 1982 as the second single by the Kids from "Fame", the recording group of the Fame TV series based on the 1980 film of the same name.

Whilst "Starmaker" was released in the US in March 1982, it was not released in the UK until September 1982. It entered the UK charts at number 38, then stayed on the charts for 10 weeks peaking at number 3, the highest charting of The Kids from "Fame"'s singles. In 1983 the song reached fifth place in the Dutch chart, with nine weeks in total. In the United States, WIFI AM Philadelphia deemed it a Playlist Top Add-on.

According to Radio Times, the scene has added poignancy due to the fact that actor Michael Thoma was nearing the end of his battle against cancer.

The cast performed the song at the 21 October 1982 episode of Top of the Pops, and included it as the fifth track in their The Kids from Fame Live! concert and album in 1983.

In 2003, some of the cast members were reunited by the BBC for a special programme, in which the group performed "Starmaker" to a piano arrangement by Lee Curreri who played Bruno Martelli in the series.

The song has also been covered in Paul Anka's 1978 album Listen to Your Heart Judy Collins' 1979 album Hard Times for Lovers, as a charity single by Dutch singers (featuring Luv'), and Lindsay Shawn & Maxdown's 2014 album, Vintage Ballads.

== Charts ==
Chart (1982)	Peak position
Belgium (Ultratop 50 Flanders)	8
Ireland (IRMA)	1
Netherlands (Dutch Top 40)	5
Netherlands (Single Top 100)	4
New Zealand (Recorded Music NZ)	15
UK Singles (Official Charts)	3

== The All Stars version ==
"Starmaker"

Single by The All Stars, Luv'
- Released: December 1989
- Recorded: 1989
- Genre: Pop
- Length: 4:07
- Label: Dureco/High Fashion
- Songwriters: Bruce Roberts; Carole Bayer Sager
- Producers: Jacques Zwart & Justian

The All Stars, Luv' singles chronology
"Luv' Hitpack" (1989)	"Starmaker" (1989)	"I Don't Wanna Be Lonely" (1989)

In late 1989, Franky Rampen, also known as Justian, who was part of the duo "Justian & Mandy" alongside former Frizzle Sizzle singer Mandy Huydts, launched a fundraising campaign for children in the developing world. This initiative was inspired by previous internationally acclaimed charity records, such as Do They Know It's Christmas? by Band Aid (1984) and We Are the World by U.S.A for Africa (1985).

Record producer Jacques Zwart, assembled a supergroup that featured Luv', Justian & Mandy, and various Dutch pop acts. This ensemble included Desirée, aka Desray, who later became a member of the well-known Eurodance group 2 Brothers on the 4th Floor, popular internationally in the 1990s, as well as MC Miker G, known for his work in the rap duo MC Miker G & DJ Sven, which gained international fame with the hit Holiday Rap in 1986. The group also included Marjon, who represented the Netherlands at the 1986 Eurovision Song Contest as a member of Frizzle Sizzle, along with Nando and Oscare, Jetty Weels' solo stage name following her success in the Low Countries and abroad with the girl group Mai Tai in the 1980s. The female pop group "Sisters", also produced by Jacques Zwart, completed the lineup of this all-star ensemble. Together, these artists collaborated on a cover of "Starmaker".

The proceeds of the All Stars' single were earmarked for donation to the Dutch branch of Terre des Hommes, an international children's rights charity based in The Hague.

=== Commercial response ===
The charity single "Starmaker" by the All Stars did not achieve the desired results. It entered the Tipparade (Bubbling Under Top 40) at #26 on December 23rd, 1989. In the following week, it climbed to #20 and peaked at #18 on January 13th, 1990. It only remained on this list for three weeks, ultimately failing to chart on the Dutch Top 40.

On January 6th, 1990, this record entered the Dutch National Top 100 at #72 and reached #57 on January 20, 1990. It remained on this Dutch singles chart for four weeks.

=== Formats and track listings ===
"Starmaker" by The All Stars came out in two formats.

- 7-inch single
1. "Starmaker – 4:07
2. "Air" - 12:15
- CD single
1. "Starmaker – 4:07
2. "Air" - 12:15
