= Billy Hufsey =

American actor and singer (born 1958)

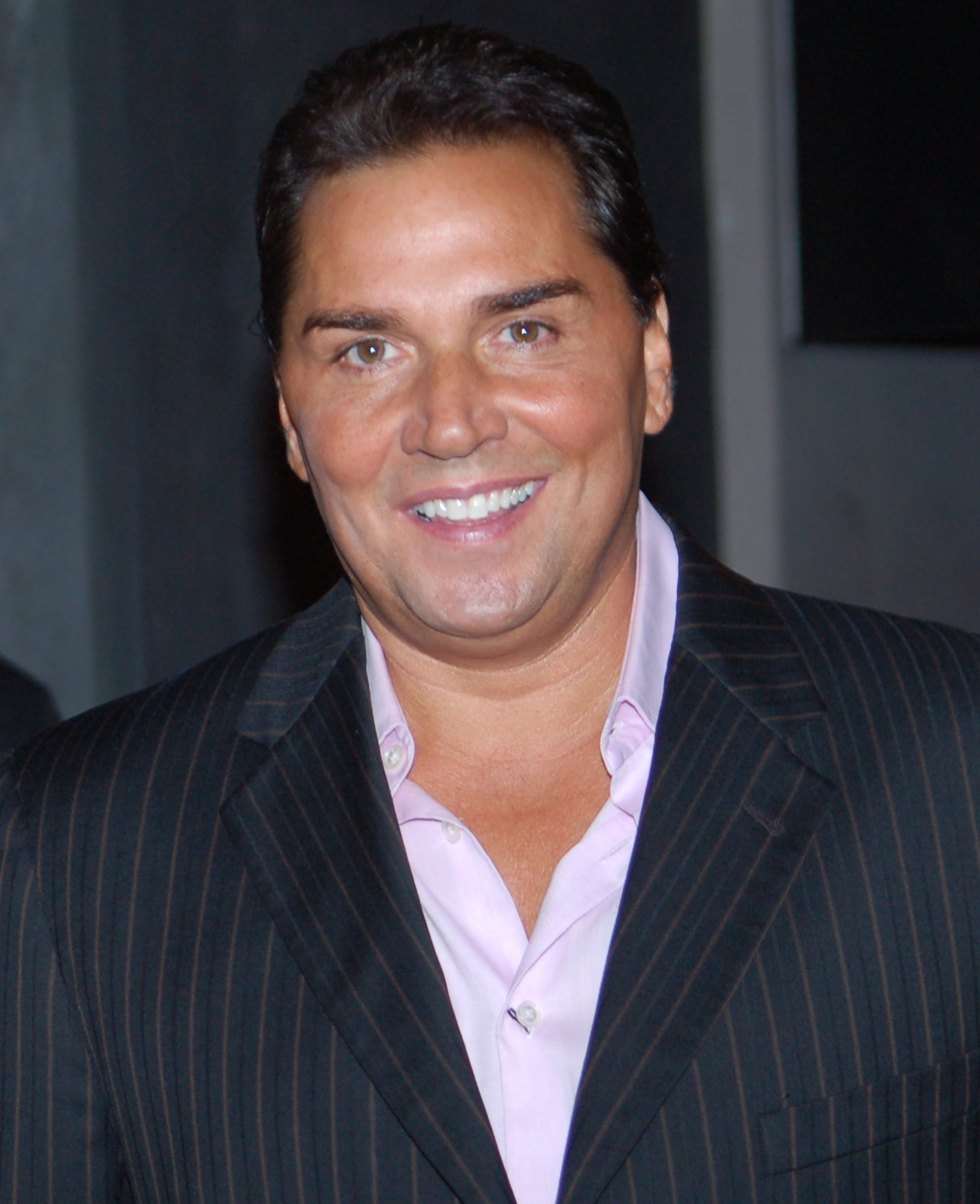
- Billy Hufsey in October 2008
- Born: December 8, 1958 (age 67); Brook Park, Ohio
- Other name: Bill Hufsey
- Occupations: Singer, actor, musician
- Years active: 1980–present
- Website: http://billyhufsey.com

Billy Hufsey (born December 8, 1958, in Brook Park, Ohio) is an American actor and singer.

== Career ==
Hufsey was on television from 1983 to 1987, playing the role of Christopher Donlon on the NBC/syndicated drama, Fame. He went on to play Emilio Ramirez on the daytime drama, Days of Our Lives from 1987 to 1991. The producers of Days of Our Lives had him write and perform several songs for the show, including "I'll Be There" and "Only This Time". In 1989, Hufsey recorded and released his album, Contagious. He also toured the world from Italy, Israel, Canada to Las Vegas and many more.

Hufsey's other television credits include Married... with Children, Webster, The Young and the Restless, General Hospital, Rags to Riches, and Baby Talk. He has also had roles in several movies, which include Tomcats, Zero Tolerance, Crazy Girls Undercover, Cold Nights into Dawn, Round Trip to Heaven, Off the Wall, and Graduation Day.

In 1985, Hufsey was featured nude, covered only by a towel, on a popular poster, which is still for sale today. The poster was also used in a scene in the British film The Fruit Machine.

On December 12, 2008, Hufsey performed a free Christmas concert in his home town of Cleveland, Ohio to raise money for "Feed a Family", a local charity that provides food to families in need.

On January 4, 2009, Hufsey starred on VH1's Confessions of a Teen Idol, a reality show in which former teen idols attempt to revitalize their entertainment careers. He said that he enjoyed his time in the house with the other six idols, as they all learned from each other.

Later in 2009, he was in the film Radio Needles and in 2011, he co-produced the Jadagrace Show.
