= List of UK top-ten albums in 1980 =

The UK Albums Chart is one of many music charts compiled by the Official Charts Company that calculates the best-selling albums of the week in the United Kingdom. Before 2004, the chart was only based on the sales of physical albums. This list shows albums that peaked in the Top 10 of the UK Albums Chart during 1980, as well as albums which peaked in 1979 and 1981 but were in the top 10 in 1980. The entry date is when the album appeared in the top ten for the first time (week ending, as published by the Official Charts Company, which is six days after the chart is announced).

The first new number-one album of the year was by Pretenders by The Pretenders. Overall, twenty-one different albums peaked at number one in 1980, with twenty unique artists and one compilation hitting that position.

== Top-ten albums ==
Key

Symbol	Meaning
‡	Album peaked in 1979 but still in chart in 1980.
♦	Album released in 1980 but peaked in 1981.
Entered	The date that the album first appeared in the chart.
Peak	Highest position that the album reached in the UK Albums Chart.

Entered (week ending)	Weeks in top 10	Single	Artist	Peak	Peak reached (week ending)	Weeks at peak
Albums in 1979
10 March 1979	32	Manilow Magic: The Best of Barry Manilow ‡	Barry Manilow	3	10 March 1979	3
11 August 1979	12	Outlandos d'Amour ‡	The Police	6	9 October 1979	1
22 September 1979	13	String of Hits	The Shadows	1	1 March 1980	3
9 October 1979	6	Eat to the Beat ‡	Blondie	1	9 October 1979	1
13 October 1979	26	Reggatta de Blanc ‡	The Police	1	13 October 1979	4
13 October 1979	20	Off the Wall ‡	Michael Jackson	5	20 October 1979	1
10 November 1979	12	Greatest Hits, Vol. 1 ‡	Rod Stewart	1	8 December 1979	5
10 November 1979	13	Greatest Hits Vol. 2 ‡	ABBA	1	17 November 1979	4
17 November 1979	8	20 Golden Greats ‡	Diana Ross	2	24 November 1979	1
1 December 1979	6	Love Songs	Elvis Presley	4	5 January 1980	1
8 December 1979	9	The Wall ‡	Pink Floyd	3	8 December 1979	4
8 December 1979	6	ELO's Greatest Hits ‡	Electric Light Orchestra	7	8 December 1979	1
15 December 1979	4	Peace in the Valley ‡	Various artists	6	22 December 1979	3
22 December 1979	6	20 Hottest Hits	Hot Chocolate	3	5 January 1980	1
22 December 1979	3	London Calling ‡	The Clash	9	22 December 1979	3
Albums in 1980
5 January 1980	6	Bee Gees Greatest	Bee Gees	6	12 January 1980	3
12 January 1980	9	One Step Beyond...	Madness	2	2 February 1980	1
19 January 1980	9	Pretenders	The Pretenders	1	19 January 1980	4
19 January 1980	3	Video Stars	Various artists	5	26 January 1980	1
26 January 1980	1	Semi Detached Suburban: 20 Great Hits of the Sixties	Manfred Mann	9	26 January 1980	1
2 February 1980	3	Permanent Waves	Rush	3	2 February 1980	1
2 February 1980	4	Short Stories	Jon and Vangelis	4	16 February 1980	1
2 February 1980	3	Golden Collection	Charley Pride	6	9 February 1980	2
9 February 1980	7	The Last Dance	Various artists	1	16 February 1980	2
16 February 1980	4	Kenny	Kenny Rogers	7	1 March 1980	1
23 February 1980	5	Get Happy!!	Elvis Costello and The Attractions	2	23 February 1980	3
23 February 1980	2	Too Much Pressure	The Selecter	5	23 February 1980	1
23 February 1980	8	Tell Me on a Sunday	Marti Webb	2	22 March 1980	1
8 March 1980	13	Greatest Hits	Rose Royce	1	19 April 1980	2
8 March 1980	1	Greatest Hits	KC and the Sunshine Band	10	8 March 1980	1
15 March 1980	6	Tears and Laughter	Johnny Mathis	1	22 March 1980	2
15 March 1980	3	Nobody's Heroes	Stiff Little Fingers	8	22 March 1980	1
22 March 1980	4	Heart Breakers: 20 Golden Greats from Matt Monro	Matt Monro	5	22 March 1980	3
29 March 1980	9	12 Gold Bars	Status Quo	3	5 April 1980	4
29 March 1980	3	The Crystal Gayle Singles Album	Crystal Gayle	7	29 March 1980	1
29 March 1980	1	Glass Houses	Billy Joel	9	29 March 1980	1
5 April 1980	8	Duke	Genesis	1	5 April 1980	2
5 April 1980	2	Star Tracks	Various artists	6	12 April 1980	1
12 April 1980	2	Wheels of Steel	Saxon	5	19 April 1980	1
19 April 1980	2	British Steel	Judas Priest	4	19 April 1980	1
19 April 1980	9	The Magic of Boney M. – 20 Golden Hits	Boney M.	1	17 May 1980	2
19 April 1980	1	The Barbara Dickson Album	Barbara Dickson	7	19 April 1980	1
19 April 1980	1	Facades	Sad Café	8	19 April 1980	1
26 April 1980	2	Iron Maiden	Iron Maiden	4	26 April 1980	1
26 April 1980	3	The Bobby Vee Singles Album	Bobby Vee	5	26 April 1980	1
26 April 1980	4	Hypnotised	The Undertones	6	26 April 1980	1
26 April 1980	16	Sky 2	Sky	1	3 May 1980	2
26 April 1980	4	Suzi Quatro's Greatest Hits	Suzi Quatro	4	10 May 1980	1
3 May 1980	4	Heaven and Hell	Black Sabbath	9	3 May 1980	2
10 May 1980	1	By Request	Lena Martell	9	10 May 1980	1
17 May 1980	3	Just One Night	Eric Clapton	3	17 May 1980	2
17 May 1980	2	Sports Car	Judie Tzuke	7	24 May 1980	1
31 May 1980	8	McCartney II	Paul McCartney	1	31 May 1980	2
31 May 1980	7	I Just Can't Stop It	The Beat	3	31 May 1980	1
31 May 1980	10	Me Myself I	Joan Armatrading	5	31 May 1980	4
31 May 1980	17	Flesh and Blood	Roxy Music	1	28 June 1980	4
31 May 1980	4	Champagne and Roses	Various artists	7	14 June 1980	1
7 June 1980	6	Peter Gabriel 3 (Melt)	Peter Gabriel	1	14 June 1980	2
7 June 1980	3	Ready an' Willing	Whitesnake	6	14 June 1980	1
21 June 1980	3	Hot Wax	Various artists	3	21 June 1980	2
21 June 1980	1	Magic Reggae	Various artists	9	21 June 1980	1
28 June 1980	2	The Photos	The Photos	4	28 June 1980	1
28 June 1980	3	Saved	Bob Dylan	3	5 July 1980	1
28 June 1980	1	Defector	Steve Hackett	9	28 June 1980	1
5 July 1980	6	Emotional Rescue	The Rolling Stones	1	5 July 1980	2
5 July 1980	5	Uprising	Bob Marley and the Wailers	6	12 July 1980	2
12 July 1980	4	The Game	Queen	1	19 July 1980	2
12 July 1980	2	Live at Last	Black Sabbath	5	12 July 1980	1
19 July 1980	7	Deepest Purple: The Very Best of Deep Purple	Deep Purple	1	2 August 1980	1
19 July 1980	1	King of the Road	Boxcar Willie	5	19 July 1980	1
19 July 1980	8	Xanadu: Original Motion Picture Soundtrack	Olivia Newton-John and Electric Light Orchestra	2	2 August 1980	1
26 July 1980	5	Searching for the Young Soul Rebels	Dexys Midnight Runners	6	26 July 1980	2
26 July 1980	9	Give Me the Night	George Benson	3	6 September 1980	1
2 August 1980	2	Closer	Joy Division	6	2 August 1980	1
9 August 1980	6	Back in Black	AC/DC	1	9 August 1980	2
16 August 1980	4	Glory Road	Gillan	3	16 August 1980	2
16 August 1980	3	Kaleidoscope	Siouxsie and the Banshees	5	23 August 1980	1
30 August 1980	3	Drama	Yes	2	30 August 1980	2
6 September 1980	3	Breaking Glass	Hazel O'Connor	5	6 September 1980	1
6 September 1980	1	Can't Stop the Music: Original Soundtrack	Village People	9	6 September 1980	1
13 September 1980	3	Telekon	Gary Numan	1	13 September 1980	1
13 September 1980	5	Signing Off	UB40	2	13 September 1980	2
13 September 1980	3	I'm No Hero	Cliff Richard	4	13 September 1980	1
13 September 1980	1	The Michael Schenker Group	Michael Schenker Group	8	13 September 1980	1
20 September 1980	8	Never for Ever	Kate Bush	1	20 September 1980	1
20 September 1980	1	Blizzard of Ozz	Ozzy Osbourne	7	20 September 1980	1
20 September 1980	1	Hanx!	Stiff Little Fingers	9	20 September 1980	1
20 September 1980	1	Now We May Begin	Randy Crawford	10	20 September 1980	1
27 September 1980	5	Scary Monsters (and Super Creeps)	David Bowie	1	27 September 1980	2
27 September 1980	4	Mounting Excitement	Various artists	2	4 October 1980	1
27 September 1980	4	The Very Best of Don McLean	Don McLean	4	4 October 1980	1
27 September 1980	1	Crash Course	U.K. Subs	8	27 September 1980	1
27 September 1980	1	The Absolute Game	The Skids	9	27 September 1980	1
4 October 1980	3	More Specials	The Specials	5	11 October 1980	1
4 October 1980	5	Absolutely	Madness	2	11 October 1980	1
4 October 1980	2	Paris	Supertramp	7	11 October 1980	1
11 October 1980	15	Zenyatta Mondatta	The Police	1	11 October 1980	4
18 October 1980	17	Guilty	Barbra Streisand	1	8 November 1980	2
18 October 1980	2	Chinatown	Thin Lizzy	7	18 October 1980	1
25 October 1980	3	The River	Bruce Springsteen	2	25 October 1980	1
25 October 1980	3	Just Supposin'	Status Quo	4	25 October 1980	2
25 October 1980	2	The Love Album	Various artists	6	25 October 1980	1
1 November 1980	3	Organisation	Orchestral Manoeuvres in the Dark	6	1 November 1980	2
1 November 1980	1	Faces	Earth, Wind & Fire	10	1 November 1980	1
8 November 1980	16	Hotter than July	Stevie Wonder	2	8 November 1980	1
8 November 1980	3	Ace of Spades	Motörhead	4	8 November 1980	1
8 November 1980	2	Live... in the Heart of the City	Whitesnake	5	8 November 1980	1
8 November 1980	2	Gold	The Three Degrees	9	8 November 1980	2
15 November 1980	33	Kings of the Wild Frontier ♦	Adam and the Ants	1	24 January 1981	12
15 November 1980	10	Not the Nine O'Clock News	Not the Nine O'Clock News Cast	5	22 November 1980	2
22 November 1980	11	Super Trouper	ABBA	1	22 November 1980	9
22 November 1980	3	Foolish Behaviour	Rod Stewart	4	29 November 1980	1
22 November 1980	2	Country Legends	Various artists	9	29 November 1980	1
29 November 1980	3	Autoamerican	Blondie	3	29 November 1980	1
29 November 1980	4	Chart Explosion	Various artists	6	6 December 1980	1
6 December 1980	2	Sound Affects	The Jam	2	6 December 1980	1
6 December 1980	10	Greatest Hits	Dr. Hook	2	13 December 1980	1
6 December 1980	4	Inspirations	Elvis Presley	6	13 December 1980	1
20 December 1980	16	Double Fantasy ♦	John Lennon and Yoko Ono	1	7 February 1981	2
20 December 1980	6	Barry ♦	Barry Manilow	5	31 January 1981	1
20 December 1980	4	20 Golden Greats of Ken Dodd	Ken Dodd	8	27 December 1980	3

== See also ==
- 1980 in British music
- List of number-one albums from the 1980s (UK)
