= Raiders of the Pop Charts =

Compilation album by Various artists
- Released: 1982
- Label: Ronco

Raiders of the Pop Charts is a compilation album released by Ronco in late 1982. It spent two weeks at number one in the UK Albums chart in January 1983.

The compilation was released as two separate vinyl albums (or cassettes), but they were sold as a single item, under the guise of "Part 2" being a free gift with "Part 1", a gimmick often used for compilation albums around that time.

The album should not be confused with an identically titled compilation issued in Australia in the same year by Ronco's rival K-Tel.

== Track listing ==
Side A

1. Madness: "Our House"
2. Modern Romance: "Best Years of Our Lives"
3. Haircut 100: "Love Plus One"
4. Clannad: "Theme From Harry's Game"
5. Raw Silk: "Do It To The Music"
6. The Chaps: "Rawhide"
7. Incantation: "Cacharpaya"
8. Fat Larry's Band: "Zoom"

Side B

1. Culture Club: "Do You Really Want to Hurt Me"
2. The Pretenders: "Back on the Chain Gang"
3. Japan: "Nightporter"
4. Heaven 17: "Let Me Go"
5. Tight Fit: "Fantasy Island"
6. Dave Stewart and Barbara Gaskin: "Johnny Rocco"
7. Toni Basil: "Mickey"

Side C

1. Kid Creole and the Coconuts: "Annie, I'm Not Your Daddy"
2. Yazoo: "Only You"
3. Lene Lovich: "It's You, Only You (Mein Schmerz)"
4. The Beat: "I Confess"
5. Toto Coelo: "I Eat Cannibals"
6. Precious Little: "The On And On Song"
7. Whodini: "Magic's Wand"
8. The Pale Fountains: "Thank You"

Side D

1. Shakin' Stevens: "Give Me Your Heart Tonight"
2. Simple Minds: "Someone Somewhere in Summertime"
3. Robert Palmer: "Some Guys Have All the Luck"
4. UB40: "So Here I Am"
5. Gregory Isaacs: "Night Nurse"
6. Morrissey–Mullen: "Bladerunner"
7. The Kids from "Fame": "Starmaker"

== See also ==
- List of UK Albums Chart number ones of the 1980s
