= Out-of-Sync =

1995 film directed by Debbie Allen

- Theatrical release poster
- Directed by: Debbie Allen
- Written by: Robert E. Dorn
- Produced by: Tim Reid; Earl Edward Saunders
- Starring: LL Cool J Victoria Dillard; Howard Hesseman; Ramy Zada; Aries Spears; Don Yesso; Yaphet Kotto
- Cinematography: Isidore Mankofsky
- Edited by: David Pincus
- Music by: Paul Buckmaster; Guy Moon; Steve Tyrell
- Distributed by: United Image Entertainment
- Release date: June 2, 1995
- Running time: 105 minutes
- Country: United States
- Language: English

Out-of-Sync is a 1995 American crime drama film featuring LL Cool J in his first starring role. Directed by Debbie Allen, the movie co-starred Victoria Dillard, Tim Reid and Howard Hesseman.

== Plot ==
Jason St. Julian (LL Cool J), a talented yet troubled DJ with a gambling problem. As Jason is sleeping, Crash (Gene Anthony Ray) and Nut (Mark Venturini) break into his apartment to collect a debt. Since Jason doesn't have the money, he gets a week to repay it. One night while DJing an underground party, Jason runs into Danny Simon (Ramy Zada) and his girlfriend Monica (Victoria Dillard), Danny tries to convince Jason to DJ at his club, but he refuses to do so because of Danny was responsible for sending Jason to jail.

Moments later, the party is broken up by the police, and Jason is arrested for his part. While being interrogated, Jason meets Marcus Caldwell (Howard Hesseman), a crooked cop, who blackmails him into DJing for Danny. While at Danny's club, Jason begins to flirt with Monica. Danny sees this, and he threatens to harm Jason if he so much as breathes on her. Jason and Monica, now a couple, devise a plan by stealing $400,000 from Danny by making it look like a robbery. While holding onto the money, Jason meets Monica at a motel. They celebrate by drinking champagne and throwing the money in the air and making love.

As Jason is sleeping, Monica takes the money and flies off to Cancun. Caldwell goes to Jason's room and berates him for letting Monica take the money as she went to the police and told what actually happened. Caldwell tells Jason to get the money back or else. As Jason tries to find Monica, Danny kills Monica's sister and while Jason goes to his apartment, Danny's goons follow him there. While getting info about Monica, Jason's friend Frank (Aries Spears) offers to go to Jason's apartment to get the "stash".

While in the apartment, Danny's goons return there and find Frank hiding. Frank is asked where Jason is, but Frank refuses to tell them and he gets severely beaten and ends up in the hospital. Meanwhile, Jason finds Monica in Cancun. He follows her to her hotel room and proceeds to take back the money while she's taking a shower. When she gets out, Jason stands before her holding the money, and Monica pulls out her gun in an attempt to kill Jason, but he's taken the bullets out. Left with no other options, Monica throws herself at Jason but this does not work. Jason prepares to leave, but then tells Monica that Danny killed her sister.

As Danny and his associate Shorty proceed to head back to his office, they find Jason in there and demand why he's there. Shorty pulls out his gun but Jason reminds him that if he's killed, then he'll never know where his money is. While this discussion is going on, Caldwell comes in and he feels entitled to the money. Apparently, Caldwell has been paid a percentage of all the drugs that goes into the club but he wants a bigger cut. Later, a shootout takes place with Danny and Shorty being killed. Caldwell, who's wounded in the shootout, forces Jason to walk back to the club at gunpoint. Being in the club, a video is played showing Caldwell killing Danny and Shorty. The police arrive soon after, and Caldwell is promptly arrested.

During the last scene, Jason has paid off his debt and Crash and Nut tell him that the only reason they done what they did to him was "just business". Nut tells Jason that "playoffs are starting" but Jason declines the offer and Crash tells him to be careful as others are going to wonder where he got so much money. Nut and Jason have an exchange where Jason exacts revenge for all the pain Nut has caused him. While talking to Quincy (Yaphet Kotto), Jason tells him that he's going back to New York. Quincy tells him to be careful and wishes him well in the future. Jason drives to New York and that ends the movie.

== Cast ==
- LL Cool J as Jason St. Julian
- Victoria Dillard as Monica Simmons
- Tim Reid as Detective Wilson
- Howard Hesseman as Detective Caldwell
- Yaphet Kotto as Quincy
- Luis Antonio Ramos as Ramon
- Aries Spears as Frank
- Don Yesso as Shorty
- Carlo Imperato as Pauley
- Gene Anthony Ray as Crash
- Ramy Zada as Danny Simon
- Debbie Allen as Manicurist
- Mark Venturini as Nut

== Reception ==
Keith Bailey of Radio Times awarded the film one star out of five.

TV Guide gave the film a negative review: “OUT OF SYNC is by no means an exceptionally good movie, but it does not lay claims to being one either. Shot in under a month for about $1.5 million by a novice director with a cast of no ‘major talent,’ it probably should have been as disappointing as most direct-to-video films are, and no one would have needed to apologize.”
