= Victoria Dillard =

American actress

- Born: September 20, 1967 (age 58); New York City, New York, U.S.
- Occupation: Actress
- Years active: 1987–2009

Victoria Dillard (born September 20, 1967) is an American advocate for Parkinson's disease research. She is also a former television and film actress who is best known for her co-starring roles as Janelle Cooper in the ABC sitcom Spin City, as one of the royal bathers in the 1988 Eddie Murphy romantic comedy Coming to America, and as the wife of Denzel Washington's main character in the 1991 action thriller film Ricochet.

== Life and career ==
Dillard was born in New York City. She began performing at the age of five with the Dance Theatre of Harlem. She worked with the company until she was eighteen, appearing in such productions Porgy and Bess at the Metropolitan Opera. Then she went on tour in A Funny Thing Happened on the Way to the Forum with Mickey Rooney.

Dillard's most notable television role was as Janelle Cooper in the ABC sitcom Spin City. She stayed on the show for four seasons before leaving in 2000. Her other television credits include Star Trek: The Next Generation, Seinfeld, Roc, L.A. Law, Chicago Hope, Martin, Moesha, Family Law, Law & Order, Law & Order: Criminal Intent and other series.

Some of her film credits are Coming to America (1988), Deep Cover (1992), The Glass Shield (1994), Internal Affairs (1990), Out-of-Sync (1995) with LL Cool J, and Ricochet (1991) with Denzel Washington. Dillard also appeared as Betty Shabazz in the 2001 film Ali, her last film to date.

Dillard was featured in the November 1988 Playboy issue in the article "Sex In Cinema 1988", referencing her brief topless appearance in the beginning of Coming to America.

== Personal life ==
Dillard currently lives in New York City. She dances in her free time and writes screenplays and plays for the stage. Dillard was dating actor Laurence Fishburne beginning in 1992 when the two met on the set of the film Deep Cover. Their relationship ended in 1995.

In 2006, at the age of 39, Dillard was diagnosed with Parkinson's disease. It is the same disease that afflicts her former Spin City co-star, actor Michael J. Fox. She has since become an advocate for Parkinson's disease research and treatments.

== Filmography ==
=== Film ===
Year	Title	Role	Notes
1988	Coming to America	Bather/Dancer	
1990	Internal Affairs	Kee	
1991	Ricochet	Alice Styles	
1992	Deep Cover	Betty McCutcheon	
1994	Killing Obsession	Jean Wilson	
1994	The Glass Shield	Barbara Simms	
1995	Out-of-Sync	Monica Collins	
1995	Statistically Speaking	Waitress	Short
1997	The Ditchdigger's Daughters	Tass	TV movie
1999	The Best Man	Anita	
2001	Tara	Ms. Cameo	Video
2001	Commitments	Fox Giovanni	TV movie
2001	Ali	Betty Shabazz	

=== Television ===
Year	Title	Role	Notes
1987	Star Trek: The Next Generation	Ballerina	Episode: "Where No One Has Gone Before"
1990	Nasty Boys	Nicole Stanhope	Episode: "Last Tango in Vegas"
1993	Seinfeld	Agency Rep.	Episode: "The Old Man"
1993	Tribeca	Olivia	Episode: "The Box"
1994	L.A. Law	Regina Cole	Episode: "Silence Is Golden"
1994	Roc	Suzanne	Episode: "You Shouldn't Have To Lie"
1994	Chicago Hope	Dr. Nadine Winslow	Episode: "Over the Rainbow" & "With the Greatest of Ease"
1995	Martin	Sharon	Episode: "Three Homies and a Baby"
1996	Moesha	Beverly	Episode: "The List"
1996-00	Spin City	Janelle Cooper	Recurring cast: season 1, main cast: season 2-4
2001	Family Law	Marcia Henderson	Episode: "Angel's Flight"
2004	Law & Order	Belinda Gardner	Episode: "C.O.D."
2007	Law & Order: Criminal Intent	Sharon Adams	Episode: "Self-made"
2009	The Unusuals	Dora Nix	Episode: "Pilot"
