= Commitments (film) =

2001 television film

- Movie cover
- Written by: Carmen Green; Carol Mayes
- Directed by: Carol Mayes
- Starring: Allen Payne; Victoria Dillard
- Music by: Kurt Farquhar
- Country of origin: United States
- Original language: English

Production
- Producers: John J. Kelly; Vince Ravine

Original release
- Network: BET
- Release: May 4, 2001

Commitments is a drama film released in 2001 on television by BET. The movie stars Allen Payne and Victoria Dillard, focusing on the relationship that grows between Fox Giovanni (Dillard) and Van Compton (Payne).
