= The Kids from "Fame" (album) =

Studio album by The Kids from "Fame"
- Released: July 1982
- Genres: Pop, MOR
- Label: RCA
- Producer: Barry Fasman

The Kids from "Fame" chronology
The Kids from "Fame" (1982)	Again (1982)

Professional ratings
Review scores
Source	Rating
Allmusic	3.5/5 stars

The Kids from "Fame" is the first album released by the cast of the American TV series Fame. It was released in 1982 and featured the hit singles "Hi Fidelity" and "Starmaker". The album was a major global success, most notably in the United Kingdom, where it stayed at the top of the UK Album Chart for 12 weeks.

== Overview ==
The US TV series Fame became an international success, most prominently in the United Kingdom and Republic of Ireland, where the series debuted in June 1982 on BBC One and RTÉ One respectively, and achieved high ratings for both channels. The first song from the series to be released in both countries, "Hi Fidelity", peaked at number five and number three on the UK Singles Chart and Irish Singles Chart respectively. Simultaneously, this album was released in July 1982 and quickly topped the UK Album Chart, remaining at the top of the chart for 12 weeks. Soon after, a second song "Starmaker" was released and became an even bigger success in the United Kingdom and Republic or Ireland than its predecessor, peaking at number three and number one on the UK Singles Chart and Irish Singles Chart respectively. The album ended the year as Britain's second-best selling album of 1982, beaten only by Barbra Streisand's Love Songs album. It remained on the UK Album Chart for 46 weeks and sold over a million copies - the biggest-selling album ever released by BBC Records (who had licensed the songs from RCA).

The album was also a top 30 hit in Norway, Sweden, the Netherlands and New Zealand, but only managed to reach #146 in the US. A third single was released in the Netherlands, "Life is a Celebration". In the United Kingdom, a follow-up album The Kids from "Fame" Again was released just three months later, and peaked at number two on the UK Album Chart.

The album was released on Compact Disc in 2000.

== Track listing ==
Side one
No.	Title	Writer(s)	Length
1.	"Starmaker" (The Kids from Fame)	Bruce Roberts; Carole Bayer Sager	4:07
2.	"I Can Do Anything Better Than You Can" (solo by Debbie Allen, Erica Gimpel)	David Wolfert; Sandy Linzer	3:05
3.	"I Still Believe in Me" (solo by D. Allen, E. Gimpel)	Gary Portnoy; Susan Sheridan	3:26
4.	"Life is a Celebration" (solo by Carlo Imperato, E. Gimpel)	Rick Springfield	3:06
5.	"Step Up to the Mike" (solo by C. Imperato, E. Gimpel, Gene Anthony Ray, Valerie Landsburg)	Alan Gordon	3:33

Side two
No.	Title	Writer(s)	Length
1.	"Hi-Fidelity" (solo by V. Landsburg)	Enid Levine	2:46
2.	"We Got the Power" (solo by E. Gimpel, G. A. Ray)	Barry Fasman; Steve Sperry	3:23
3.	"It's Gonna be a Long Night" (solo by Lori Singer)	Estelle Levitt; Portnoy	4:01
4.	"Desdemona" (solo by C. Imperato, G. A. Ray, V. Landsburg)	Fasman; Sperry	3:38
5.	"Be My Music" (solo by E. Gimpel, G. A. Ray, Lee Curreri, V. Landsburg)	Curreri	3:36

Credits

== Charts ==
Chart (1982)	Peak position
Australian Albums (Kent Music Report)	34
UK Albums (OCC)	1

== Certifications ==
Certifications for The Kids from "Fame"
Region	Certification	Certified units/sales
United Kingdom (BPI)	3× Platinum	900,000^{‡}
^{‡} Sales+streaming figures based on certification alone.

== Personnel ==
- Arranger – Barry Fasman
- Concertmaster– Sid Sharp
- Coordinator [Production]– Linda Gerrity
- Engineer– Joe Robb, John Arrias, John Mills, Mike Lietz, Stuart Graham, Tony D'Amico
- Executive-Producer– Charles Koppelman, Martin Bandier
- Producer – Barry Fasman
- Guitar– Dean Parks, Greg Poree, Michael Landau, Mitch Holder
- Keyboards, Synthesizer– David Garfield, Jai Winding, John Hobbs, Lee Curreri, Michael Boddicker, Robbie Buchanan
- Bass– Andy Muson, Dennis Belfield, Nathan East
- Drums– David Kemper, Rick Shlosser
- Percussion– Gary Coleman, Steve Forman
- Backing Vocals– Carl Graves, Clydene Jackson, Denise DeCaro, Gail Heideman, Joseph Williams, Julia Waters, Kathy Burch, Luther Waters, Mark Creamer, Marti McCall, Maxine Waters, Mendy Lee, Nick Uhrig, Oren Waters, Steve Sperry
- Mastering– Chris Bellman
- Art Direction, Design– Glenn Parsons, Tim Bryant
- Photography – Ron Slenzak
- A&R (Coordinator)– Marge Meoli
