= List of UK top-ten albums in 1981 =

The UK Albums Chart is one of many music charts compiled by the Official Charts Company that calculates the best-selling albums of the week in the United Kingdom. Before 2004, the chart was only based on the sales of physical albums. This list shows albums that peaked in the Top 10 of the UK Albums Chart during 1981, as well as albums which peaked in 1980 and 1982 but were in the top 10 in 1981. The entry date is when the album appeared in the top ten for the first time (week ending, as published by the Official Charts Company, which is six days after the chart is announced).

The first new number-one album of the year was by Kings of the Wild Frontier by Adam and the Ants. Overall, seventeen different albums peaked at number one in 1981, with fifteen unique artists and two compilations hitting that position.

== Top-ten albums ==
Key

Symbol	Meaning
‡	Album peaked in 1979 or 1980 but still in chart in 1981.
♦	Album released in 1981 but peaked in 1982.
Entered	The date that the album first appeared in the chart.
Peak	Highest position that the album reached in the UK Albums Chart.

Entered (week ending)	Weeks in top 10	Single	Artist	Peak	Peak reached (week ending)	Weeks at peak
Albums in 1979
10 March 1979	32	Manilow Magic: The Best of Barry Manilow ‡	Barry Manilow	3	10 March 1979	3
Albums in 1980
11 October 1980	15	Zenyatta Mondatta ‡	The Police	1	11 October 1980	4
18 October 1980	17	Guilty ‡	Barbra Streisand	1	1 November 1980	2
8 November 1980	16	Hotter than July ‡	Stevie Wonder	2	8 November 1980	1
15 November 1980	33	Kings of the Wild Frontier	Adam and the Ants	1	24 January 1981	12
15 November 1980	10	Not the Nine O'Clock News ‡	Not the Nine O'Clock News Cast	5	22 November 1980	2
6 December 1980	10	Greatest Hits ‡	Dr. Hook	2	13 December 1980	1
6 December 1980	4	Inspirations ‡	Elvis Presley	6	13 December 1980	1
20 December 1980	16	Double Fantasy	John Lennon and Yoko Ono	1	7 February 1981	2
20 December 1980	6	Barry	Barry Manilow	5	31 January 1981	1
20 December 1980	4	20 Golden Greats of Ken Dodd ‡	Ken Dodd	8	27 December 1980	3
Albums in 1981
17 January 1981	5	The Best of Bowie	David Bowie	3	24 January 1981	4
17 January 1981	1	Flash Gordon: Original Soundtrack	Queen	10	17 January 1981	1
24 January 1981	4	Imagine	John Lennon	5	7 February 1981	1
24 January 1981	2	Paradise Theatre	Styx	8	7 February 1981	1
24 January 1981	2	Mondo Bongo	The Boomtown Rats	6	7 February 1981	1
31 January 1981	1	Trust	Elvis Costello and The Attractions	9	31 January 1981	1
7 February 1981	10	Making Movies	Dire Straits	4	14 February 1981	1
14 February 1981	8	Vienna	Ultravox	3	7 March 1981	2
14 February 1981	6	Dance Craze: Original Soundtrack	Various artists	5	7 March 1981	1
14 February 1981	13	The Jazz Singer: Original Soundtrack from the Motion Picture	Neil Diamond	3	21 March 1981	1
21 February 1981	15	Face Value	Phil Collins	1	21 February 1981	3
21 February 1981	3	Moving Pictures	Rush	3	21 February 1981	1
21 February 1981	5	Difficult to Cure	Rainbow	3	28 February 1981	1
21 February 1981	1	The Gospel According to the Meninblack	The Stranglers	8	21 February 1981	1
28 February 1981	4	Stray Cats	The Stray Cats	6	14 March 1981	1
14 March 1981	3	Journeys to Glory	Spandau Ballet	5	21 March 1981	1
21 March 1981	2	The Very Best of Rita Coolidge	Rita Coolidge	6	21 March 1981	1
28 March 1981	2	Never Too Late	Status Quo	2	28 March 1981	1
28 March 1981	3	Face Dances	The Who	2	4 April 1981	2
28 March 1981	4	Sky 3	Sky	3	4 April 1981	1
11 April 1981	11	This Ole House	Shakin' Stevens	2	16 May 1981	1
18 April 1981	4	Come an' Get It	Whitesnake	2	18 April 1981	1
18 April 1981	1	Intuition	Linx	8	18 April 1981	1
25 April 1981	4	Future Shock	Gillan	2	25 April 1981	2
25 April 1981	2	Hit and Run	Girlschool	5	25 April 1981	1
2 May 1981	3	Chartblasters '81	Various artists	3	2 May 1981	2
2 May 1981	2	Living Ornaments '79 and '80	Gary Numan	2	9 May 1981	1
9 May 1981	3	Roll On: 16 Great Disco Hits	Various artists	3	9 May 1981	1
16 May 1981	3	Wha'ppen?	The Beat	3	23 May 1981	1
16 May 1981	3	Bad for Good	Jim Steinman	7	16 May 1981	1
16 May 1981	8	Chariots of Fire	Vangelis	5	13 June 1981	1
23 May 1981	13	Stars on 45 – The Album	Starsound	1	23 May 1981	5
23 May 1981	1	The Adventures of Thin Lizzy	Thin Lizzy	6	23 May 1981	1
23 May 1981	1	Quit Dreaming and Get on the Beam	Bill Nelson	7	23 May 1981	1
23 May 1981	8	Hi Infidelity	REO Speedwagon	6	22 August 1981	1
30 May 1981	9	Anthem	Toyah	2	6 June 1981	1
30 May 1981	9	Disco Daze and Disco Nites	Various artists	1	4 July 1981	1
30 May 1981	2	Long Distance Voyager	The Moody Blues	7	30 May 1981	1
6 June 1981	4	Themes	Various artists	6	6 June 1981	3
6 June 1981	1	Heaven Up Here	Echo & the Bunnymen	10	6 June 1981	1
13 June 1981	10	Present Arms	UB40	2	13 June 1981	1
13 June 1981	2	Magnetic Fields	Jean-Michel Jarre	6	20 June 1981	1
27 June 1981	7	No Sleep 'til Hammersmith	Motörhead	1	27 June 1981	1
27 June 1981	2	Juju	Siouxsie and the Banshees	7	27 June 1981	1
27 June 1981	10	Duran Duran	Duran Duran	3	5 September 1981	1
4 July 1981	13	Love Songs	Cliff Richard	1	11 July 1981	5
4 July 1981	12	Secret Combination	Randy Crawford	2	18 July 1981	3
11 July 1981	6	Kim Wilde	Kim Wilde	3	18 July 1981	1
1 August 1981	1	Cats	Original London Cast	6	1 August 1981	1
8 August 1981	7	Time	Electric Light Orchestra	1	29 August 1981	2
8 August 1981	4	Classic Rock – Rock Classics	London Symphony Orchestra	5	8 August 1981	1
8 August 1981	2	KooKoo	Debbie Harry	6	15 August 1981	1
15 August 1981	4	The Official BBC Album of the Royal Wedding	Various artists	1	15 August 1981	2
15 August 1981	2	Pretenders II	The Pretenders	7	15 August 1981	1
22 August 1981	2	Bat Out of Hell	Meat Loaf	9	22 August 1981	1
29 August 1981	2	Shot of Love	Bob Dylan	6	29 August 1981	2
12 September 1981	10	Dead Ringer	Meat Loaf	1	12 September 1981	2
12 September 1981	6	Tattoo You	The Rolling Stones	2	12 September 1981	2
12 September 1981	2	Dance	Gary Numan	3	19 September 1981	1
19 September 1981	3	Rage in Eden	Ultravox	4	19 September 1981	2
19 September 1981	3	Walk Under Ladders	Joan Armatrading	6	19 September 1981	1
19 September 1981	10	Shaky	Shakin' Stevens	1	7 November 1981	1
26 September 1981	5	Abacab	Genesis	1	26 September 1981	2
26 September 1981	6	Super Hits 1 & 2	Various artists	2	3 October 1981	2
26 September 1981	7	Wired for Sound	Cliff Richard	4	3 October 1981	1
26 September 1981	7	Hooked on Classics	Louis Clark conducting the Royal Philharmonic Orchestra	4	17 October 1981	1
26 September 1981	1	Celebration – The Anniversary Album	Johnny Mathis	9	26 September 1981	1
3 October 1981	1	Denim and Leather	Saxon	9	3 October 1981	1
10 October 1981	13	Ghost in the Machine	The Police	1	10 October 1981	3
10 October 1981	4	If I Should Love Again	Barry Manilow	5	10 October 1981	1
10 October 1981	3	Madness 7	Madness	5	17 October 1981	1
24 October 1981	22	Dare	The Human League	1	31 October 1981	4
24 October 1981	1	Still	Joy Division	5	24 October 1981	1
24 October 1981	3	Hedgehog Sandwich	Not the Nine O'Clock News Cast	5	31 October 1981	1
31 October 1981	10	The Best of Blondie	Blondie	4	31 October 1981	1
31 October 1981	3	Almost Blue	Elvis Costello and The Attractions	7	7 November 1981	1
31 October 1981	2	Love is...	Various artists	10	31 October 1981	2
7 November 1981	14	Greatest Hits	Queen	1	14 November 1981	4
7 November 1981	2	Exit... Stage Left	Rush	6	7 November 1981	1
14 November 1981	10	Prince Charming	Adam and the Ants	2	14 November 1981	3
14 November 1981	14	Architecture & Morality	Orchestral Manoeuvres in the Dark	3	21 November 1981	2
14 November 1981	2	Tonight I'm Yours	Rod Stewart	8	14 November 1981	2
14 November 1981	1	Speak & Spell	Depeche Mode	10	14 November 1981	1
28 November 1981	8	Chart Hits '81	Various artists	1	12 December 1981	1
28 November 1981	18	Pearls ♦	Elkie Brooks	2	13 February 1982	2
28 November 1981	7	Begin the Beguine ♦	Julio Iglesias	5	3 April 1982	1
5 December 1981	2	For Those About to Rock	AC/DC	3	5 December 1981	1
5 December 1981	5	The Simon and Garfunkel Collection: 17 of Their All-Time Greatest Recordings	Simon & Garfunkel	4	12 December 1981	1
19 December 1981	7	The Visitors	ABBA	1	19 December 1981	3

== See also ==
- 1981 in British music
- List of number-one albums from the 1980s (UK)
