= Barry Fasman =

American songwriter

Barry Fasman (born 9. October 1946 in Chicago, Illinois) was an American music producer, songwriter, arranger, composer and orchestral conductor.

== Career ==
In 1966, Fasman was a founding member and bass player in a band called the One-Eyed Jacks in Champaign-Urbana, IL. By 1971 he was producing records for Wooden Nickel Records. In 1982, Fasman was a producer at BBC Records, and produced the chart-topping album The Kids from "Fame". That year he received the British Record Producer of the Year Award. He has also created and directed music for theatrical productions.

Fasman's production and writing credits include Johnny Mathis, the theme song for "It's Showtime at the Apollo", and 32 songs for the NBC TV show "Fame". He arranged and conducted the top 10 hits "Don't Cry Out Loud" by Melissa Manchester, "It's My Turn" by Diana Ross and Air Supply's "Every Woman in the World". Fasman also produced the first album of musician and author Dan Brown.
