= Erica Gimpel =

American actress, singer, dancer, and composer

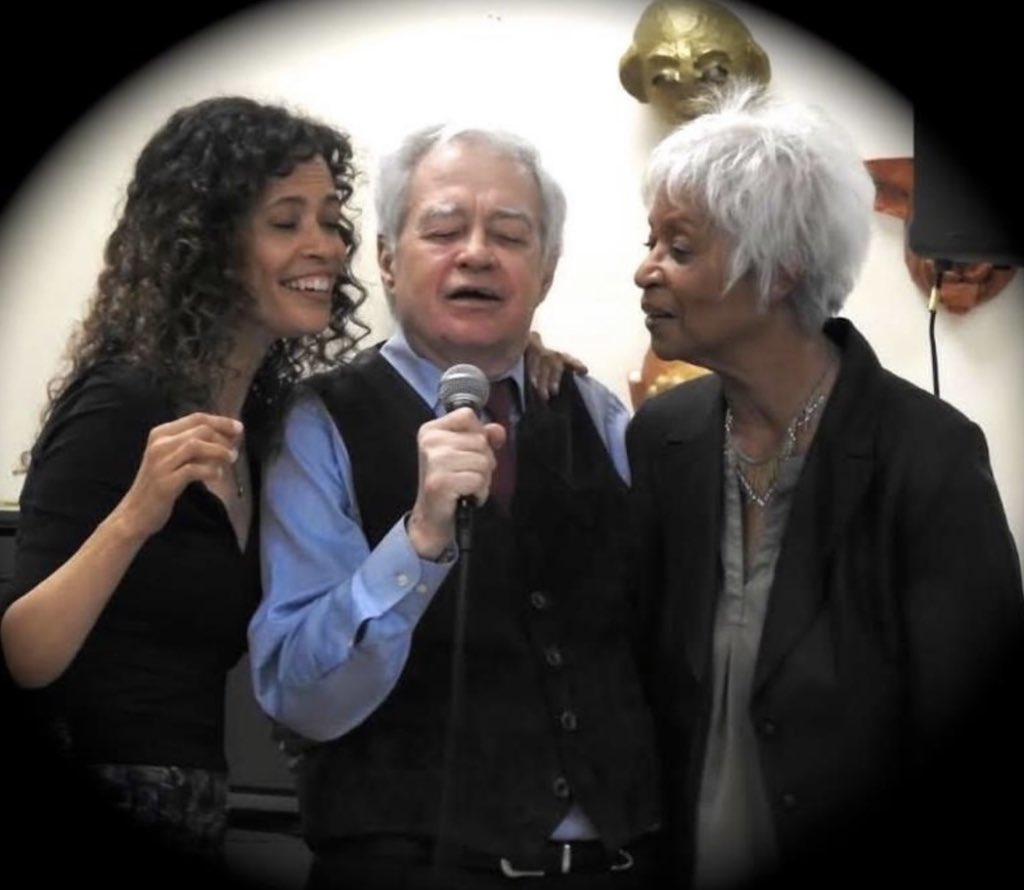
- Erica Gimpel, Joseph Gimpel (her father) and Phyllis Bash (her mother) singing Our Love Is Here to Stay (2018)
- Born: Erica Fawn Gimpel; June 25, 1964 (age 62); New York City, U.S.
- Education: High School of Performing Arts
- Occupations: Actress; singer; dancer
- Years active: 1982–present
- Known for: Fame; Profiler; ER

Erica Fawn Gimpel (born June 25, 1964) is an American actress, singer, dancer, and composer. She is best known for her roles on television shows Fame as Coco Hernandez and on Profiler as Angel Brown. She is also known for her recurring roles on the television shows ER as Adele Newman and on Veronica Mars as Alicia Fennel. From 2018 to 2020, Gimpel had a series regular role as Trish on the series God Friended Me.

Gimpel was a judge on RTÉ One's Fame: The Musical, an Irish TV talent show seeking a boy and a girl to play Nick and Serena respectively in the Irish touring production of Fame.

== Personal life ==
Gimpel was born in Manhattan, New York City in 1964. She graduated from New York's High School of Performing Arts a few months after she started filming her role as a student at the same school for the television show Fame. She had toured the United States and Europe with her mother, singer Phyllis Bash, who was in the opera Porgy and Bess. Her father, Joseph Gimpel, was an actor, writer and singer.

== Career ==
=== Film and television ===
Gimpel has starred in numerous primetime and streaming shows including NCIS: New Orleans, Chicago Med, Grey's Anatomy, Shut Eye, True Blood, Criminal Minds, Nikita, Rizzoli & Isles, House, ER, Profiler, and Veronica Mars. One of Gimpel's favorite projects was playing Trish on the CBS drama God Friended Me for two seasons. She played Ellie Fielding in Mayfair Witches and Brittany Arrington on The Night Agent.

On film, she has appeared in Tuesday Morning Ride (1995), Smoke, King of New York, No Such Thing, Freaky Friday, Romeo and Juliet in Harlem, and Sylvie's Love, and in the independent feature Bang Bang (2023).

=== Theater ===
Theater credits include originating the role of Mayme in Lynn Nottage's award-winning Intimate Apparel., Glory Bee in States of Shock, and Nelly in Each Day Dies With Sleep. Gimpel received the Stage Raw Award for Best Solo Performance for her work in the one-woman play Sister by Michael Phillip Edwards.

=== Music ===
In January 2010, Gimpel released the album Spread your Wings and Fly, recorded live in Santa Monica.

Gimpel composed and performed the song "This Moment" on God Friended Me. She also co-wrote and performed the song "Goodbye" on Babylon 5.

== Filmography ==
=== Film ===
Year	Title	Role	Notes
1988	Case Closed	Kathy	TV movie
1990	King of New York	Dr. Shute	
1990	Penny Ante: The Motion Picture	Dale Martinez	
1991	Homicide	Woman with Randolph	
1991	Undertow	Nina	
1994	The Fence	Jackie	
1994	Amateur	Irate Woman	
1995	Smoke	Doreen Cole	
1995	Flirt	Nurse	
1995	Tuesday Morning Ride	Modine	Short
1995	The Price of Love	Officer Hudson	TV movie
1996	Sticks & Stones	Miss William	
1997	Touch Me	Kareen	
1999	Santa and Pete	Cassie Moore	TV movie
1999	Intimate Betrayal	Toni	TV movie
2001	No Such Thing	Judy	
2001	Impostor	Newscaster No. 1	
2003	Freaky Friday	Harry's Teacher	
2004	In Your Eyes	Yolie	
2004	A Boyfriend for Christmas	Beth	TV movie
2004	Betty's Treats	Mrs. Wilson	Short
2004	Beck and Call	Leah	TV Short
2006	Jane Doe: The Harder They Fall	Margaret Monroe	TV movie
2007	The List	Gail	
2009	Veronika Decides to Die	Nurse White	
2009	Blue Eyes	Sandra	
2010	Machete Joe	Erica	
2013	Tio Papi	Det. Johnson	
2015	Cloudy with a Chance of Love	Dr. Ruth Harris	TV movie
2015	Sex, Death and Bowling	Shanti	
2017	Romeo and Juliet in Harlem	Nurse	
2020	Sylvie's Love	Eunice	
2021	Far More	Shanti	
2024	Bang Bang	Sharon	

=== Television ===
Year	Title	Role	Notes
1982–87	Fame	Coco Hernandez	Main Cast: Season 1–3, Guest: Season 4 & 6
1985	Spenser: For Hire	Shelley	Episode: "Original Sin"
1985	North and South	Semiramis	Main Cast
1986	North and South, Book II	Semiramis	Main Cast
1988	The Cosby Show	Jennifer	Episode: "Waterworks"
1990	American Playhouse	Wendy	Episode: "Women & Wallace"
1994	Law & Order	Templeton	Episode: "Breeder"
1994	Touched by an Angel	Sydney Jessup	Episode: "Tough Love"
1995	New York Undercover	Melinda	Episode: "The Smoking Section"
1996	Babylon 5	Cailyn	Episode: "Walkabout"
1996–99	Profiler	Angel Brown	Main Cast: Season 1–3, Recurring Cast: Season 3-4
1997	The Big Easy	Felice Carlyle	Episode: "Driving Ms. Money"
1997–2003	ER	Adele Newman	Recurring Cast: Season 3-4 & 6–8, Guest: Season 9
1999	Any Day Now	Laura Sanders	Episode: "A Parent's Job"
2000	The District	Ella's Lawyer	Episode: "The Real Terrorist" & "How They Lived"
2001	Roswell	FBI Agent Suzanne Duff	Recurring Cast: Season 2
2002	Touched by an Angel	Sydney Jessup	Episode: "The Last Chapter"
2002	MDs	Allison Greely	Episode: "Cruel and Unusual"
2003–04	JAG	Varese Chestnut	Episode: "A Merry Little Christmas" & "What If"
2004	The Division	Aimee Breckridge	Episode: "Bite Me"
2004–06	Veronica Mars	Alicia Fennel	Recurring Cast: Season 1-2
2005	Everwood	Dr. Gans	Episode: "Surprise"
2006	House	Elizabeth Stone	Episode: "Failure to Communicate"
2006	Numb3rs	Principal Riva Bell	Episode: "Waste Not"
2006	Criminal Minds	Sarah	Episode: "Profiler, Profiled"
2006–07	Boston Legal	Attorney Samantha Fried	Recurring Cast: Season 2, Guest: Season 3
2007	Close to Home	Dr. Udell	Episode: "Protégé"
2007	Murder 101: If Wishes Were Horses	Police Sgt. Joanne Matterson	Episode: "If Wishes Were Horses"
2008	Eleventh Hour	Lizzie Summers	Episode: "Cardiac"
2009	Grey's Anatomy	Bethany Anderson	Episode: "Invest in Love"
2011	Prime Suspect	Principal	Episode: "Wednesday's Child"
2011	The Young and the Restless	Det. Harriet Mauro	Regular Cast
2011–12	Rizzoli & Isles	ER Doctor	Guest Cast: Season 2-3
2012	Nikita	Carla Bennett	Recurring Cast: Season 2
2012	Criminal Minds	Sarah	Episode: "The Company"
2012	True Blood	Faerie Elder	Episode: "Sunset"
2013	Cult	Ginny Yarrow	Episode: "The Good Fight" & "The Devil You Know"
2014	Switched at Birth	Yvette Gifford	Episode: "Have You Really the Courage?"
2014	Enormous	Caroline	Episode: "Enormous"
2015	Code Black	Alice Sellers	Episode: "Black Tag"
2016	The Catch	Renée Etheridge	Episode: "The Larágan Gambit"
2016	Murder in the First	Corinne Hager	Episode: "The Barbers of Seville"
2017	Shut Eye	Agent Sims	Recurring Cast: Season 2
2018	Chicago Med	Lydia Singleton	Episode: "An Inconvenient Truth"
2018–20	God Friended Me	Trisha	Recurring Cast: Season 1, Main Cast: Season 2
2021	NCIS New Orleans	Lynette Carter	Episode: "Leda and the Swan, Part 1 & 2"
2022	9-1-1	Pauline Barrett	Episode: "Fear-o-phobia"
2023	Mayfair Witches	Elena "Ellie" Fielding	Recurring Cast: Season 1
2023	The Night Agent	Brittany Arrington	Episode: "The Marionette"

== See also ==
- The Kids from "Fame"
