= Carol Mayo Jenkins =

American actress (born 1938)

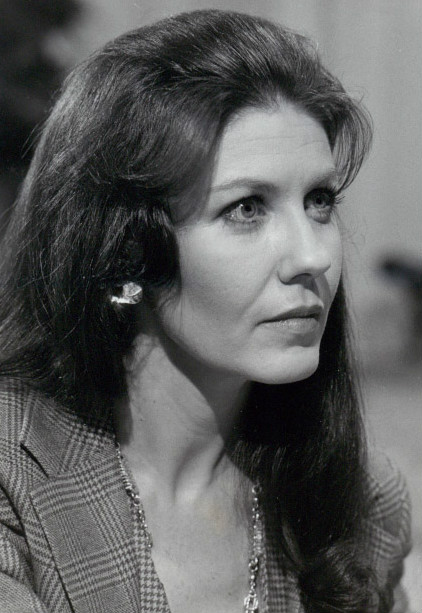
- Jenkins in 1977
- Born: November 24, 1938 (age 87); Knoxville, Tennessee, U.S.
- Occupation: Actress
- Known for: Fame

Carol Mayo Jenkins (born November 24, 1938) is an American actress, most famous for playing Elizabeth Sherwood, a liberal and stern but fair-minded teacher of English at New York City's High School for the Performing Arts on T.V. series Fame. She left the show at the end of its fifth season in 1986 but made a return for the series finale a year later.

She also appeared in the television shows Aaron's Way, Matlock, and Max Headroom.

== Education ==
Her parents enrolled her in acting lessons at the Bijou Theatre where she was taught by Irene Hayes Hodges. They pulled her from acting lessons because they didn’t feel she was learning anything and later enrolled in acting lessons taught by Mrs. Emily Faust. Faust’s other students included Mary Costa and Patricia Neal.

She was enrolled at the Royal Central School of Speech and Drama in London for three years. While in London, she co-founded Drama Centre London which is “considered one of the leading theatre schools in England”.

== Career ==
She toured throughout The United States, Russia, and Lithuania in Edward Albee's play, Who's Afraid of Virginia Woolf?, as Martha where she was cast by the playwright.

She taught acting at the University of Tennessee, from 2001 until her retirement in September, 2023. She appeared frequently on the Clarence Brown Theatre stage with her most recent performance being in the productions of Murder on the Orient Express as Princess Natalya Dragomiroff in 2023.

== Work ==
=== Film ===
Year	Title	Role	Ref
1983	Happy Endings	Jan Wilkerson	
1990	Hollywood Heartbreak	Lottie	
1992	Seduction: Three Tales From the Inner Sanctum		

=== Television ===
Year	Title	Role	Notes	Ref
1977	Another World	Vera Finley		
1982-1987	Fame	Elizabeth Sherwood		
1987	Max Headroom	Valerie Towne	1 Episode	
1988	Aaron's Way	Mrs. Seward	1 Episode	
1990	Dragnet		1 Episode	
1991	Matlock	Dr. Doris Massler	1 Episode	

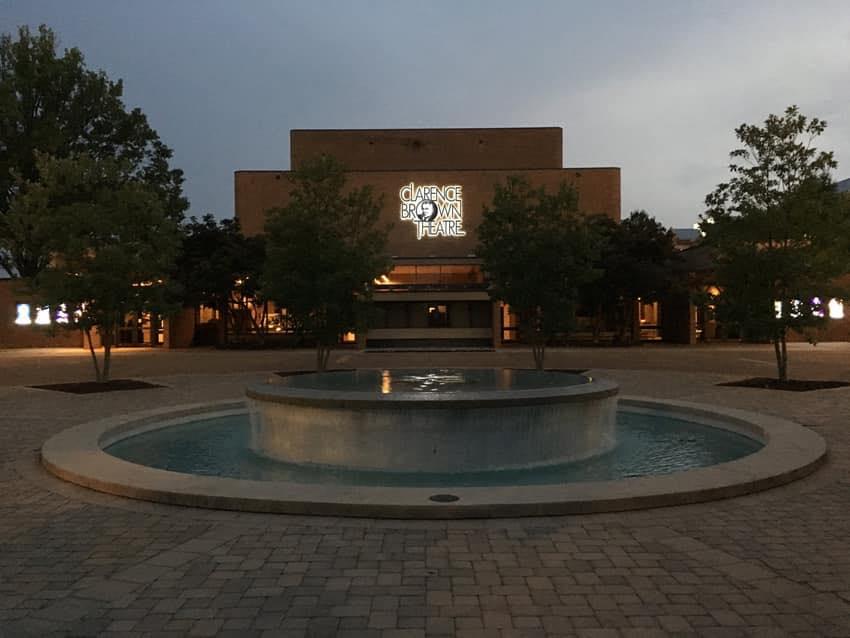
The Clarence Brown Theatre on the campus of The University of Tennessee/Knoxville.

=== Broadway ===
Year	Title	Role	Ref
1969	The Three Sisters	Natalya Ivanovna	
1972	There's One in Every Marriage	Hotel Guest	
1976	Kings	Jocasta	
1978	First Monday in October	Miss Birnbaum	
1980	The Suicide	Margarita Ivanovna	
