= Gene Anthony Ray =

American actor, dancer, and choreographer (1962–2003)

- Ray in 1986
- Born: May 24, 1962; Harlem, New York City, New York, U.S.
- Died: November 14, 2003 (aged 41); New York City, New York, U.S.
- Other name: Gene Ray
- Education: Julia Richman High School; High School of Performing Arts
- Occupations: Actor; dancer; choreographer
- Years active: 1978–2003
- Known for: Leroy Johnson – Fame

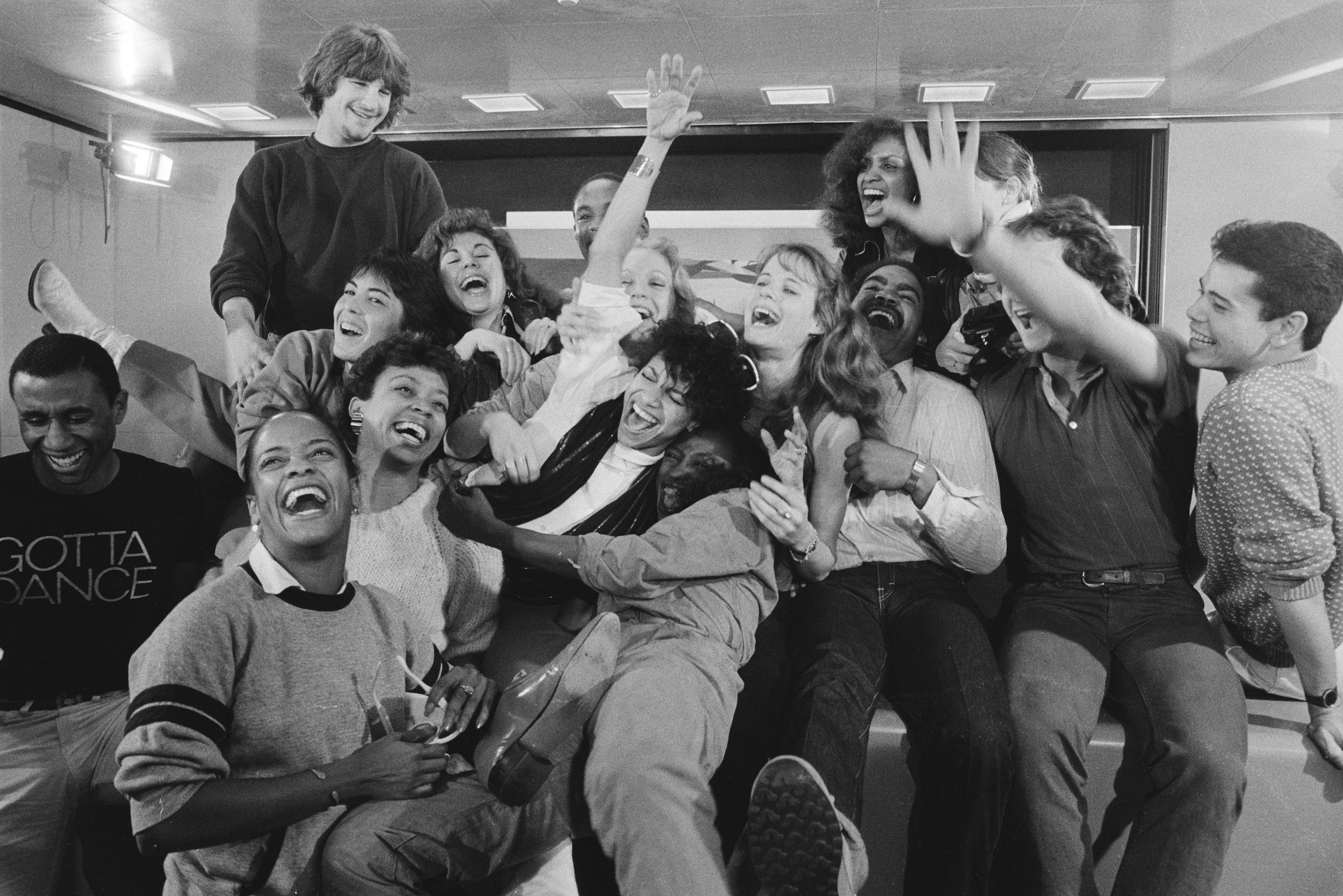
The Kids from "Fame". Gene Anthony Ray is in the back, center. Debbie Allen is center, with sunglasses on top of her head. (1983)

Gene Anthony Ray (May 24, 1962 – November 14, 2003) was an American actor, dancer, and choreographer. A native of New York City, Ray was best known for his portrayal of dancer Leroy Johnson in both the 1980 film Fame and the Fame television series based upon the film which originally aired from 1982 until 1987.

== Biography ==
=== Early life ===
Born in New York City, in the Harlem neighborhood of Manhattan on May 24, 1962, Ray grew up in the area of West 153rd Street and later became involved in street dancing at block parties. He performed in a dance class at the Julia Richman High School. He skipped school one day to audition for Fame choreographer Louis Falco. Ray attended the High School of Performing Arts, the inspiration for the film Fame, but was kicked out after just one year. "It was too disciplined for this wild child of mine," Ray's mother, Jean E. Ray, would later say.

=== Career ===
Ray won the part of Leroy Johnson in the film Fame, which was released in 1980. Much like his Fame character, Ray had little professional training, but he possessed a raw talent that won him his role for the film. Reports USA Today: "Alan (Parker, the director) had to approach him very carefully. His mom was dealing drugs during the filming. It was not pretty." In 1981, Ray starred as Friday, alongside Michael York as Robinson Crusoe, in the 1981 TV adventure-comedy Vendredi ou la Vie sauvage (alternative title: Robinson Crusoe and Man Friday).

Ray also starred in the television series based on the film, Fame. The series was produced by MGM Television from 1982 to 1987, and syndicated from 1983 to 1987. Additionally, he began touring the U.K. with the other members of the Fame cast as The Kids from "Fame"; they performed at 10 venues, including a sell-out performance at the Royal Albert Hall. In 1984, USA Today reported: "Ray was axed from the show after his mother was jailed for running a drug ring, and he failed to turn up for work 100 times." He struggled with addictions to alcohol and drugs, and worked only intermittently once the TV series ended. In 1985, Ray danced in The Weather Girls' music video for "Well-A-Wiggy".

In 1987, he won the role of Billy Nolan in the ill-fated musical adaptation of Carrie by Stephen King. Ray played the role in the original opening in Stratford-Upon-Avon, which closed after less than a month. He then transferred to Broadway and continued to play the role until the musical closed after only 21 public performances. Ray also appeared in the 1995 film Out-of-Sync, which was directed by his Fame co-star Debbie Allen, in the 1996 Whoopi Goldberg comedy Eddie (for which he was also credited as associate choreographer), as well as in commercials for Dr Pepper and Diet Coke. His last video appearance was a one-hour BBC Fame reunion documentary, Fame Remember My Name, taped in Los Angeles in April 2003.

=== Personal life and death ===
As described in his Telegraph obituary, Ray "remained a 'frantic partygoer' with a self-confessed weakness for drinking and drugs. As his life fell apart, he slept on park benches and during a failed attempt to launch a Fame-style dance school in Milan, shared a flat there with a porn actress. In 1996, he was diagnosed HIV positive. Flamboyantly camp, he brushed aside questions about his sexuality. He never married."

Ray died on November 14, 2003, aged 41, from complications of a stroke he had suffered in June that year.

== Filmography ==
Year	Title	Role	Notes
1980	Fame	Leroy Johnson	Motion Picture
1981	Vendredi ou la Vie sauvage	Friday	Television movie Alternative title: Robinson Crusoe and Man Friday
1982–1987	Fame	Leroy Johnson	Television series — 116 episodes
1995	Out-of-Sync	Crash	
1995	Article 99	Police Officer	Uncredited
1996	Eddie	Dancer	Associate choreographer
1997	The Drew Carey Show	Dancer	1 episode
2002	Austin Powers in Goldmember	Dancer	Uncredited (final film role)

== Theater ==
Year	Production	Role	Theatre
1988	Carrie	Billy Nolan	Royal Shakespeare Theatre (tryout)
1988	Carrie	Billy Nolan	Virginia Theatre, Broadway

== See also ==
- The Kids from "Fame"
- List of people from Harlem
