= Fame (1982 TV series) =

1982 TV series

- Genre: Drama; Musical
- Created by: Christopher Gore
- Based on: Fame (1980 film) by Christopher Gore
- Starring: Debbie Allen; Olivia Barash; Jesse Borrego; Loretta Chandler; Lee Curreri; Cynthia Gibb; Erica Gimpel; Albert Hague; Billy Hufsey; Carlo Imperato; Janet Jackson; Carol Mayo Jenkins; Valerie Landsburg; Ann Nelson; Nia Peeples; Gene Anthony Ray; Lori Singer; Ken Swofford; Michael Thoma
- Theme music composer: Michael Gore; Dean Pitchford; John Debney
- Opening theme: "Fame" by; Erica Gimpel (seasons 1–4); Loretta Chandler (seasons 5–6)
- Country of origin: United States
- Original language: English
- No. of seasons: 6
- No. of episodes: 136 (list of episodes)

Production
- Running time: 45–50 minutes
- Production companies: Eilenna Productions; MGM Television

Original release
- Network: NBC
- Release: January 7, 1982 – April 7, 1983
- Network: Syndication
- Release: October 15, 1983 – May 18, 1987

Fame is an American musical drama television series based on the 1980 film of the same name. It followed the lives of the students and faculty at New York City's High School of Performing Arts. Most interior scenes were filmed in Hollywood, California. In all seasons except the third, the show filmed several exterior scenes on location in New York City. The series aired on NBC from January 7, 1982 to April 7, 1983 and later in syndication from October 15, 1983 to May 18, 1987.

The popularity of the series around the world, most notably in the United Kingdom, led to several hit records and live concert tours by the cast. Despite its success, few of the actors maintained high-profile careers after the series was cancelled. Several of the cast members were seen again briefly in Bring Back...Fame, a reunion special made for Channel 4 in the United Kingdom in 2008.

== Episodes ==
Season	Episodes	Originally released		
Season	Episodes	First released	Last released	Network
1	16	January 7, 1982	May 6, 1982	NBC
2	23	September 30, 1982	April 7, 1983	NBC
3	24	October 15, 1983	May 27, 1984	Syndication
4	25	September 29, 1984	May 25, 1985	Syndication
5	24	October 12, 1985	May 24, 1986	Syndication
6	24	October 6, 1986	May 18, 1987	Syndication

== Cast ==
=== Cast timeline ===
Actor	Character	Seasons					
Actor	Character	1	2	3	4	5	6
Debbie Allen	Lydia Grant	Main	Main	Main	Main	Main	Main
Lee Curreri	Bruno Martelli	Main	Main	Main			Guest (Note: Guest in "Baby, Remember My Name" (ep. 6.24).)
Erica Gimpel	Coco Hernandez	Main	Main	Main	Guest		Guest
Albert Hague	Benjamin Shorofsky	Main	Main	Main	Main	Main	Main
Carlo Imperato	Danny Amatullo	Main	Main	Main	Main	Main	Main
Carol Mayo Jenkins	Elizabeth Sherwood	Main	Main	Main	Main	Main	Guest
Valerie Landsburg	Doris Schwartz	Main	Main	Main	Main		Guest
P.R. Paul	Montgomery MacNeill	Main					Guest
Gene Anthony Ray	Leroy Johnson	Main	Main	Main	Main	Main	Main
Lori Singer	Julie Miller	Main	Main				
Morgan Stevens	David Reardon		Main	Recurring	Guest		
Cynthia Gibb	Holly Laird			Main (Note: Departs in "Choices" (ep. 5.10).)	Main	Main	Guest
Billy Hufsey	Christopher Donlon			Main	Main	Main	Main
Ken Swofford	Vice Principal Quentin Morloch			Main (Note: Departs in "Ebenezer Morloch" (ep. 5.9).)	Main	Main	
Jesse Borrego	Jesse Velasquez				Main	Main	Main
Janet Jackson	Cleo Hewitt				Main		
Nia Peeples	Nicole Chapman				Main (Note: Departs in "Fame and Fortune" (ep. 6.10).)	Main	Main
Ann Nelson	Mrs. Gertrude Berg	Recurring	Recurring	Recurring	Main (Note: Added to opening credits from "Spontaneous Combustion" (ep. 4.3).)	Main	Main
Loretta Chandler	Dusty Tyler					Main	Main
Carrie Hamilton	Reggie Higgins					Main (Note: Added to opening credits from "Choices" (ep. 5.10).)	Main
Page Hannah	Kate Riley					Main	
Graham Jarvis	Principal Bob Dyrenforth					Main	Main
Michael Cerveris	Ian Ware						Main
Elisa Heinsohn	Jillian Beckett						Main (Note: Added to opening credits from "The Last Dance" (ep. 6.2).)
Eric Pierpoint	Paul Seeger						Main (Note: Added to opening credits from "New Faces" (ep. 6.3).)
Olivia Barash	Maxie Sharp						Main (Note: Added to opening credits from "The Crimson Blade" (ep. 6.13).)
Dick Miller	Lou Mackie				Recurring	Recurring	Main

Cast notes

=== Main cast ===
- Debbie Allen as Lydia Grant, dance teacher and choreographer, reprising her role from the original film
- Lee Curreri as Bruno Martelli (seasons 1–3; guest season 6), music major and keyboard virtuoso, reprising his role from the original film
- Erica Gimpel as Coco Hernandez (seasons 1–3; guest seasons 4, 6), music major and talented bi-racial singer/dancer, replacing Irene Cara from the original film
- Albert Hague as Professor Benjamin Shorofsky, classically trained music teacher, reprising his role from the original film
- Carlo Imperato as Danny Amatullo, aspiring comedian and drama major
- Carol Mayo Jenkins as Mrs Elizabeth Sherwood (seasons 1–5; guest season 6), liberal English teacher, replacing Anne Meara from the original film
- Valerie Landsburg as Doris Schwartz (seasons 1–4; guest season 6), Jewish drama major, replacing Maureen Teefy from the original film
- P. R. Paul (Paul Ray Rosenbaum) as Montgomery MacNeill (season 1; guest season 6), drama major and son of a famous actress, replacing Paul McCrane from the original film
- Gene Anthony Ray as Leroy Johnson, dance major, later assistant dance instructor, reprising his role from the original film
- Lori Singer as Julie Miller (seasons 1–2), music major and talented cellist
- Morgan Stevens as David Reardon (season 2; recurring season 3, guest season 4), drama teacher and struggling actor
- Cynthia Gibb as Holly Laird (seasons 3–5; guest season 6), drama major
- Billy Hufsey as Christopher Donlon (seasons 3–6), dance major
- Ken Swofford as Principal Quentin Morloch (seasons 3–5), conservative school principal who often clashes with the students
- Jesse Borrego as Jesse Velasquez (seasons 4–6), multitalented Hispanic student, Leroy's protégé
- Janet Jackson as Cleo Hewitt (season 4), music major
- Nia Peeples as Nicole Chapman (seasons 4–6), music major and talented singer/dancer, killed in a car accident
- Ann Nelson as Mrs. Gertrude Berg (seasons 4–6; recurring seasons 1–2), school secretary
- Loretta Chandler as Dusty Tyler (seasons 5–6), singer and preacher's daughter
- Carrie Hamilton as Reggie Higgins (seasons 5–6), aspiring comedienne and drama major
- Page Hannah as Kate Riley (season 5), drama major
- Graham Jarvis as Principal Bob Dyrenforth (seasons 5–6), school principal who replaces Morloch
- Michael Cerveris as Ian Ware (season 6), music major and punk rocker from London's East End
- Elisa Heinsohn as Jillian Beckett (season 6), drama major and daughter of a police officer
- Eric Pierpoint as Paul Seeger (season 6), drama teacher and actor, Lydia's friend
- Olivia Barash as Maxie Sharp (season 6), professional child actress and drama major
- Dick Miller as Lou Mackie (season 6; recurring seasons 4–5), owner of the local hangout Lou's Lanes

=== Recurring characters ===
- Michael Thoma as Gregory Crandall (season 1)
- Carmine Caridi as Angelo Martelli (seasons 1–2)
- Judy Farrell as Charlotte Miller (seasons 1–3)
- Madlyn Rhue as Angela Shwartz (seasons 1–3)
- Michael DeLorenzo as Michael (seasons 1–3)
- Bronwyn Thomas as Michelle (seasons 1–4)
- David Greenlee as Dwight Mendenhall (seasons 2–5)
- Connie Needham as Kelly Hayden (season 2)
- Stephanie E. Williams as Stephanie Harrison (season 2)
- Jimmy Osmond as Troy Phillips (season 2)
- Phoebe Yardon-Lewis as Alicia Morgan (season 3)
- Sam Slovick as Cassidy (season 4)
- Dick Miller as Lou Mackie (seasons 4–6)
- Robert Romanus as Miltie Horowitz (seasons 5–6)
- Caryn Ward as Tina Johnson (seasons 5–6)
- Carolyn J. Silas as Laura Mackie (season 6)
- Denny Dillon as Corky (season 6)

=== Guest stars ===
Notable guest stars include Paul Bartel, Frances Bay, Milton Berle, Carol Burnett, Art Carney, John Carradine, Nancy Cartwright, Marge Champion, Don Cheadle, Brian Patrick Clarke, Keith Coogan, Elizabeth Daily, Fran Drescher, Dominique Dunne, Greg Evigan, Fionnula Flanagan, Randee Heller, Arte Johnson, Russell Johnson, Tuesday Knight, Kevin McCarthy, Donna McKechnie, Dermot Mulroney, Bebe Neuwirth, Anthony Newley, David Paymer, Sydney Penny, Richard Simmons, Brenda Vaccaro, Gwen Verdon, Nancy Walker, Ray Walston, Malcolm-Jamal Warner, and Betty White.

== Production ==
Fame was produced by MGM Television and aired Thursday nights at 8:00–9:00 on NBC beginning on January 7, 1982. NBC promoted its Thursday line-up (Fame, Cheers, Taxi [later Night Court], and Hill Street Blues) as "The Best Night of Television on Television!" Despite glowing reviews from critics, ratings were less than impressive, and NBC cancelled Fame after only two seasons. However, by special arrangement with LBS Communications, MGM revived the series for first-run syndication in the fall of 1983, where it continued for four more seasons, with the last first-run episode airing in the US on May 18, 1987. The show, after moving to first-run syndication, was initially financed by Metromedia, before Metromedia sued MGM/UA in 1985, and shifted to Tribune Broadcasting, where it remained until 1987. Production on the series ultimately allowed MGM to retain the intellectual property on the Fame franchise for future use despite rights to the original film going to Turner Entertainment and now being held by Warner Bros., as Turner would sell the studio to United Artists shortly after acquiring it in 1986.

Four cast members from the original movie appeared in the television series. Lee Curreri portrayed the character Bruno Martelli, an introverted musical genius. Gene Anthony Ray portrayed Leroy Johnson, a tough hood from the projects with a natural talent for dance, who muscles his way into an audition and wins. In the film, Leroy is also semiliterate, but this was dropped in favor of him having "fourth-grade reading level" in the television series. Albert Hague played teacher Benjamin Shorofsky, a German music teacher who constantly battled with Bruno Martelli over musical styles. The final cast member from the film was Debbie Allen, who portrayed Lydia Grant. Allen only appeared briefly in the movie, but her character was expanded in the series. She also became the show's original choreographer, in addition to directing several episodes and co-producing one season.

Several characters were carried over from the movie, played by different actors. Irene Cara portrayed Coco Hernandez in the film, but the part on TV was played by Erica Gimpel. Paul McCrane played gay student Montgomery McNeil in the film, but P.R. Paul portrayed Montgomery for TV and the character was no longer gay. English teacher Elizabeth Sherwood was played in the film by actress Anne Meara, but in the series was played by actress Carol Mayo Jenkins. The character Doris had her name changed from Doris Finsecker (portrayed by Maureen Teefy) to Doris Schwartz (Valerie Landsburg). The character of Ralph Garci (Tommy Aguilar inheriting the role played by Barry Miller in the film) appeared only in the pilot.

Additionally, two new characters were introduced in the TV series: cello player Julie Miller (Lori Singer), and actor-comedian Danny Amatullo (whose last name is derived from the associate producer, Tony Amatullo) played by Carlo Imperato. All subsequent characters were created for the series.

Ira Steven Behr wrote 12 episodes of the series. He recalled: "I did three years on Fame, which was a lot of fun and was also in syndication. We had no one looking over our shoulder. We got to do some wonderfully bizarre things on the show..."

Following its cancellation, two versions of the series were syndicated in reruns: the original hour-long episodes, which usually contained a primary plot, a subplot, and two or more musical numbers; and a second version, stripped of the musical numbers and the subplot and reduced to 30 minutes in length.

The show's theme song was a pop hit for singer Irene Cara, having been featured in the motion picture. A re-recorded version of the theme, using similar instrumentation to the 1980 track, was used in the TV series and sung by co-star Erica Gimpel, who played Coco Hernandez.

Although Gimpel left the series midway through the third season (after the show moved from NBC to first-run syndication in 1983), her opening vocals were still heard on the show for two more seasons. An updated version of the song, featuring a modern, synthesized hard-rock flavor, was introduced in the fall of 1985 and performed by new cast member Loretta Chandler (Dusty). This version ran for the final two seasons of Fame.

"I Still Believe in Me", from an episode of the series titled "Passing Grade", was nominated for an Emmy Award for Best Original Song. It was performed by Erica Gimpel and Debbie Allen, and co-written by Gary Portnoy, who went on to co-write and sing the theme from Cheers. In the United Kingdom, two singles credited to The Kids from "Fame", "Hi-Fidelity" and "Starmaker", peaked within the top ten of the UK Singles Chart.

The arts-focused cable network Ovation began airing reruns of Fame in 2011 for a period.

== International broadcasts ==
- Canada: Aired in first-run syndication
- France: Series started on March 6, 1982, on TF1
- United Kingdom: Series started on June 17, 1982, on BBC1. Only the first four seasons were screened on BBC1; the full series was broadcast on The Children's Channel in 1992. The BBC also helped pay for seasons 3 and 4. On November 7, 2021, music channel Now 80s begin showing the series.
- Sweden: Series started on September 5, 1982, on SVT1
- Israel: Series started in 1982
- Italy: Series was renamed "Saranno famosi" (literally, "They Will Be Famous"), started in January 1983 on Rai Due who also helped pay for seasons 3 and 4
- Brazil: Series started in 1983 on Rede Manchete
- Australia: Aired on the Seven Network
- Hong Kong: Aired on Asia Television on Saturdays in 1984–85
- Germany: Aired on Das Erste in 1984/85 (a collection of 26 episodes from the first two seasons)

== Discography ==
The Kids from "Fame" was the group name of several cast members from the series. The main vocalists of the group were Debbie Allen, Lee Curreri, Erica Gimpel, Carlo Imperato, Valerie Landsburg, Gene Anthony Ray, and Lori Singer. They performed live concerts and released several albums.

Year	Title	Details	Peak chart positions						
Year	Title	Details	AUS	FIN	NL	NOR	NZ	SWE	UK
1982	The Kids from "Fame"	Released: July 1982; Label: RCA (worldwide), BBC Records (UK)	34	1	1	11	1	3	1
1982	Again	Released: October 1982; Label: RCA (worldwide)	–	7	5	–	–	3	2
1983	Live!	Released: February 1983; RCA (worldwide), BBC Records (UK)	88	–	10	–	–	28	8
1983	Songs	Released: May 1983; Label: RCA (worldwide), BBC Records (UK)	73	–	17	–	8	12	14
1983	Sing for You	Released: August 1983; Label: RCA (Europe), BBC Records (UK)	–	–	17	–	–	32	28
1984	Rock 'N Roll World	Released: 1984; Label: RCA (US, Canada, Greece); Credited as 'Fame', rather than the usual 'The Kids from "Fame"'	–	–	–	–	–	–	–
1984	Best of Fame	Released: 1984; Label: RCA (worldwide)	–	–	–	–	–	–	–
2004	Ultimate Fame	Released: October 2004; Label: BMG (UK); Contains songs from the film soundtrack, the TV series, and stage musical.; Also released in a limited edition series one DVD set	–	–	–	–	–	–	–
2022	Live in Liverpool	Released: March 25, 2022; Label: CD Licious; Contains songs from the Fame U.K. Reunion 2019 Concerts in Liverpool. All profits Benefit Claire House Children's Hospital.	–	–	–	–	–	–	–
–	"—" denotes releases that did not chart or were not released								

== Home media ==
Sony Pictures Home Entertainment released the first season of Fame to DVD in Region 1 on November 1, 2005.

20th Century Fox, under license from MGM and MGM Television, released the complete first and second seasons of Fame on DVD in Region 1 and Region 2 on September 15, 2009. On January 12, 2010, Fox released seasons 1 and 2 in separate collections.

DVD releases also followed a similar pattern in Europe and Australia. Due to licensing issues, all DVDs contain some unspecified music substitutions.

US DVD	Ep #	Release date
Season 1 (MGM/Sony)	16	November 1, 2005
Seasons 1 & 2 (MGM/Fox)	38	September 15, 2009
Season 1 (MGM/Fox)	16	January 12, 2010
Season 2 (MGM/Fox)	22	January 12, 2010

== Awards ==
The series won a number of Emmy awards, and in 1983 and 1984, it won the Golden Globe Awards: Television, Best Series, Musical/Comedy. Actress, director and choreographer Debbie Allen, who had a small role in the motion picture, but played a major character in the television version, also won several awards.

== Bring Back...Fame ==
On 27 December 2008, Channel 4 in the United Kingdom (despite Fame having originally been aired in Britain on BBC1) aired a 90-minute special titled Bring Back...Fame, which sought out and reunited some of the original cast members of the television series.

Hosted by Justin Lee Collins, and apparently filmed the previous summer, the show followed the presenter around the United States as he tracked down actors from the series and then staged a reunion. The program showed Collins appearing to surprise the former cast members in locations, including restaurants, a recording studio, a gym, Los Angeles airport, and a cinema, before interviewing them and persuading them to take part in the reunion.

The actors featured were Debbie Allen, Carol Mayo Jenkins, Lee Curreri, Erica Gimpel, Valerie Landsburg, and Carlo Imperato. Also interviewed were Irene Cara and the mother of Gene Anthony Ray. Whether other actors from the series had also been approached but had declined to take part was not stated. Excerpts from the TV series were shown throughout the programme. The final scenes showed the six principal actors and a number of backing dancers taking part in a recreation of the title sequence of the TV programme.

== See also ==
- The Kids from "Fame" – the recording group
- Un paso adelante (Spanish series based on Fame)
- Fame Looks at Music '83
- Fame (1980 film)
