= The Kids from "Fame" =

- The Kids from "Fame" at Amsterdam Airport Schiphol, the Netherlands, 1983

Background information
- Origin: United States
- Genre: Pop
- Instruments: Vocals, Keyboards
- Years active: 1982–1984
- Labels: RCA Records, BBC Records

The Kids from "Fame" was the group name of several cast members from the American TV series Fame who had a number of hit singles and albums at the height of the show's success in the United Kingdom. This success culminated in tours of Britain, where they performed live in concert. A live album was subsequently released.

== Background ==
The group came to prominence in the summer of 1982 when the series first aired on BBC1 in the United Kingdom and a song from the program, "Hi Fidelity", peaked at number five on the UK Singles Chart. Along with this an album was released: The Kids from "Fame", which topped the UK Album Chart for 12 weeks. A series of singles and albums followed over the next 12 months with songs taken from the show's first three seasons. By the summer of 1983, interest in the show was beginning to wane in their native United States, and the releases abruptly stopped, although the TV series carried on until 1987.

The main vocalists of the group were Debbie Allen, Valerie Landsburg, Erica Gimpel, Carlo Imperato, Gene Anthony Ray, Lee Curreri, and Lori Singer.

In late 1982 the cast members as The Kids from "Fame" performed some live shows in the United Kingdom, which led to a tour of the rest of Europe in early-1983. These included a show at the Royal Albert Hall in London which was recorded and released as an album. It was during the 1983 tour that stories began to emerge in the press that things were not so harmonious off-stage with stories of drug-taking, alcohol abuse and backstage rows. During the tour Erica Gimpel and Debbie Allen had a disagreement over the choice of a song which ultimately led to Gimpel walking out of the tour and heading back to the United States. The tour carried on without her, but led to further press reports of how Allen was being domineering over the others and was labelled in one article as "a bitch". Allen later commented on the accusations saying that they upset her, but in reality was just trying to keep the group together and focused amid the late-night parties and mayhem (which included Gene Anthony Ray smashing up a dressing room at one point). Several members commented that they were unaware of the success of the show until they arrived in London, which they found overwhelming. Prior to this, Valerie Landsburg did some promotional work alone in the United Kingdom during the summer of 1982 to promote the "Hi Fidelity" single, which was riding high on the UK Singles Chart at the time.

In 2003, a TV special reunited some members of the group to talk about their time on the show and as the performing group aired in the United Kingdom on BBC Three. The special culminated in them performing the song "Starmaker" to Lee Curreri's piano accompaniment. This was Gene Anthony Ray's last on-screen appearance before his death some months later.

Subsequently, in 2008, British television host and comedian Justin Lee Collins traveled to America to unite various members of the group in a show titled Bring Back...Fame. They spoke of their success as a group in the United Kingdom and their live shows, and mentioned Gimpel quitting the group during the tour due to the pressures. Lansburg also talked about her surprise at the success of "Hi Fidelity" on the UK Singles Chart. Curreri spoke about the music, saying that he was the only member to contribute to the writing of the songs and the only member to play an instrument on the recordings (synthesizer). However, Lori Singer also played the cello on some of the recordings. The show aired in the United Kingdom on Channel 4 on December 27, 2008.

== Discography ==
=== Albums ===
Year	Title	Details	Peak chart positions						
Year	Title	Details	AUS	FIN	NL	NOR	NZ	SWE	UK
1982	The Kids from "Fame"	Released: July 1982; Label: RCA (worldwide), BBC Records (UK)	34	1	1	11	1	3	1
1982	Again	Released: October 1982; Label: RCA (worldwide)	–	7	5	–	–	3	2
1983	Live!	Released: February 1983; RCA (worldwide), BBC Records (UK)	88	–	10	–	–	28	8
1983	Songs	Released: May 1983; Label: RCA (worldwide), BBC Records (UK)	73	–	17	–	8	12	14
1983	Sing for You	Released: August 1983; Label: RCA (Europe), BBC Records (UK)	–	–	17	–	–	32	28
1984	Rock 'N Roll World	Released: 1984; Label: RCA (US, Canada, Greece); Credited as 'Fame', rather than the usual 'The Kids from "Fame"'	–	–	–	–	–	–	–
1984	Best of Fame	Released: 1984; Label: RCA (worldwide)	–	–	–	–	–	–	–
2004	Ultimate Fame	Released: October 2004; Label: BMG (UK); Contains songs from the film soundtrack, TV series and stage musical.; Also released in a limited edition series one DVD set	–	–	–	–	–	–	–
2022	Live in Liverpool	Released: March 25 2022; Label: CD Licious *CD Licous Website; Contains songs from the Fame U.K. Reunion 2019 Concerts in Liverpool. All profits Benefit Claire House Children's Hospital.	–	–	–	–	–	–	–
–	"—" denotes releases that did not chart or were not released								

=== Singles ===
Year	Single	Peak chart positions					
Year	Single	AUS	BE (FLA)	IRE	NL	NZ	UK
1982	"Hi Fidelity" (Note: Lead vocals by Valerie Landsburg)	56	23	3	11	24	5
1982	"Starmaker"	–	8	1	4	15	3
1982	"Be Your Own Hero" (Note: Lead vocals by Erica Gimpel)	–	–	–	–	–	–
1982	"Mannequin" (UK-only release) (Note: Lead vocals by Gene Anthony Ray)	–	–	18	–	–	50
1983	"Friday Night" (Live version; UK-only release) (Note: Lead vocals by Carlo Imperato)	–	–	15	–	–	13
1983	"Body Language" (UK-only release) (Note: Lead vocals by Debbie Allen)	–	–	–	–	–	76
1983	"We Got the Power" (Note: Lead vocals by Erica Gimpel and Gene Anthony Ray)	–	–	–	–	–	–
1983	"Songs" (UK-only release) (Note: Lead vocals by Carlo Imperato and Erica Gimpel)	–	–	–	–	–	104
1983	"Rock 'n Roll World"	–	–	–	–	–	–
"—" denotes releases that did not chart or were not released

=== Videos ===
Year	Title	Details
1983	Live at the Royal Albert Hall	Label: MGM/UA Home Video (US, UK); Medium: VHS, LaserDisc
