= This Is Reggae Music: The Golden Era 1960–1975 =

Box set by various artists
- Released: 2004
- Recorded: 1960–1975
- Genre: Reggae; rocksteady; ska; mento
- Length: 4:30:37
- Label: Trojan

Professional ratings
Review scores
Source	Rating
AllMusic	4/5 stars

This Is Reggae Music: The Golden Era 1960–1975 is a reggae retrospective anthology issued as a 4-CD box set in 2004 by Trojan Records. The anthology, which was compiled by Colin Escott and Bas Hartong, is arranged in chronological order and features tracks by various artists, starting with mento and ska from the first half of the 1960s, then progressing to the slower rhythms of rocksteady and reggae, which both emerged later in the decade, continuing into the 1970s. Several of the acts featured are Derrick Morgan, Desmond Dekker & the Aces, Toots & the Maytals, Jimmy Cliff, and Bob Marley and the Wailers.

== Music ==
The first disc features ska and other precursors to reggae. Colin Escott's liner notes point out the influence of American R&B on Jamaican acts. The set begins with "Iron Bar", a traditional by Lord Tanamo, reflecting reggae's early mento roots. Derrick Morgan follows with the Latin-influenced "Fat Man". Millie Small's 1964 offbeat version of "My Boy Lollipop", previously recorded by Barbie Gaye, was the first ska song to achieve international success. Several of the songs, such as the Clarendonians's "Rude Boy Gone to Jail" and Desmond Dekker & the Aces' "Rudie Got Soul" display a preoccupation with the "rude boy" culture of post-colonial Jamaica that was fashionable in the lyrics of much of ska and early reggae. Several other numbers by Desmond Decker & the Aces are featured in the set, and the disc also includes "007 (Shanty Town)" (1967) and their worldwide 1968 hit "Israelites", which heralded the transition from ska to reggae.

Disc 2 concentrates on (post-ska) rocksteady and reggae tracks recorded between 1968 and 1970, such as Toots & the Maytals' "Do the Reggay", "Monkey Man" and "Pressure Drop", as well Jimmy Cliff's "Wonderful World, Beautiful People" and "Many Rivers to Cross". The Slickers' "Johnny Too Bad", like several of the other tracks on this compilation were featured in the movie, The Harder They Come starring Jimmy Cliff, and its soundtrack album. Tony Tribe does a rendition of "Red Red Wine", originally written and performed by Neil Diamond, which later became a hit for UB40.

The third disc continues with more early examples of early reggae, stretching into the early 1970s. Freddie Notes & the Rudies sing a version of Bobby Loom's hit, "Montego Bay". Also featured is Greyhound's version of "Black and White", originally composed by David Arkin and Earl Robinson, which later supplied a major hit for Three Dog Night. Several pre-fame songs recorded by Bob Marley and Peter Tosh with the Wailers are included on disc 3, which were produced by Lee "Scratch" Perry. Tosh sings the lead vocal on "400 Years" and Marley on "Duppy Conqueror", "Small Axe", and "African Herbsman".

The final disc in the set covers the period between 1972 and 1975, when reggae was beginning to reach a much wider audience. Other songs by Bob Marley and Peter Tosh recorded with the Wailers appear on this side, such as "Trenchtown Rock" and "Brand New Second Hand". "I Can See Clearly Now" provided a worldwide hit for Johnny Nash in 1972. He also does a rendition of Bob Marley's "Stir It Up", included here. Also featured is "Better Must Come" by Delroy Wilson and "The Time Has Come", by Slim Smith. The set ends with "Marcus Garvey", a tribute to the black nationalist, by Burning Spear.

== Track listing ==
=== Disc 1 ===
1. Lord Tanamo: "Iron Bar" (traditional) 2:17
2. Derrick Morgan: "Fat Man" (Derrick Morgan) 2:21
3. Stranger Cole: "Rough and Tough" (Theodore Cole) 3:01
4. Arthur Reid: "Music Is My Occupation" (Don Drummond/Tommy McCook) 3:03
5. Millie Small: "My Boy Lollipop" (Morris Levy/J. Roberts/Robert Spencer) 2:01
6. Eric "Monty" Morris: "Penny Reel-O" (Eric "Monty" Morris/Arthur Reid) 2:30
7. Roland Alphonso: "Phoenix City" (Roland Alphonso) 3:01
8. Bongo Man Byfield: "Bongo Man" 3:11
9. The Clarendonians: "Rude Boy Gone a Jail" (Peter Austin) 2:47
10. Desmond Dekker & the Aces: "Rudy Got Soul" (Desmond Dacres/Leslie Kong) 2:49
11. Stranger & Patsy: "Down by the Trainline" (Wilburn "Squiddley" Cole) 2:46
12. Alton Ellis & The Flames: "Cry Tough" (Alton Elton Ellis) 2:16
13. Desmond Dekker & the Aces: "007 (Shanty Town)" (Desmond Dekker) 2:33
14. Hopeton Lewis: "Take It Easy" (Hopeton Lewis) 2:54
15. Derrick Harriott: "The Loser" (Derrick Harriott) 3:37
16. The Ethiopians: "Train to Skaville" (Leonard Dillon) 2:51
17. The Jamaicans: "Ba Ba Boom" (Arthur Reid/Norris Weir) 3:19
18. Keith & Tex: "Stop That Train" (Derrick Harriott/Keith Rowe) 3:16
19. Alton Ellis & The Flames: "Rock Steady" (Alton Ellis) 2:39
20. The Paragons: "The Tide Is High" (John Holt) 2:42
21. Ken Parker: "True, True, True" (Arthur Reid) 2:13
22. Desmond Dekker: "Israelites" (Desmond Dekker) 2:34
23. Toots & the Maytals: "54-46 That's My Number" (Toots Hibbert) 3:23
24. The Ethiopians: "Everything Crash" (Leonard Dillon) 2:31

=== Disc 2 ===
1. Toots & the Maytals: "Do the Reggay" (Toots Hibbert) 3:09
2. Desmond Dekker & the Aces: "It Miek" (Desmond Dacres/Leslie Kong) 2:33
3. The Ethiopians: "Engine 54" (Leonard Dillon) 2:38
4. The Uniques featuring Slim Smith: "The Beatitude (Blessed Are the Meek)" (Slim Smith/The Uniques) 3:11
5. Lloyd Robinson: "Cuss Cuss" (Harry Johnson) 2:33
6. Lee "Scratch" Perry: "People Funny Boy" (Rainford Hugh Perry) 2:36
7. The Untouchables: "Tighten Up" (Rainford Hugh Perry) 2:39
8. The Upsetters: "Return of Django" (Rainford Hugh Perry) 2:30
9. Dave Barker & The Upsetters: "Shocks of Mighty" (Rainford Hugh Perry) 2:47
10. Toots & the Maytals: "Monkey Man" (Toots Hibbert) 3:45
11. The Pioneers: "Long Shot Kick de Bucket" (Dawn Agard/Sydney Crooks/Earl Robinson) 2:42
12. The Tennors: "Ride Your Donkey" (Norman Davis/Albert George Murphy) 2:03
13. Tony Tribe: "Red Red Wine" (Neil Diamond) 2:55
14. Jimmy Cliff: "Wonderful World, Beautiful People" (James Chambers) 3:10
15. Toots & the Maytals: "Pressure Drop" (Toots Hibbert) 2:58
16. Gregory Isaacs: "Don't Let Me Suffer" (Gregory Isaacs) 3:31
17. The Melodians: "Rivers of Babylon" (Tony Brevette/Brenton Dowe/Trevor McNaughton) 3:24
18. Harry J All & the Stars: "Liquidator" (Harry Johnson) 2:53
19. The Slickers: "Johnny Too Bad" (Winston "Shadow" Bailey/Derric Crooks/Delroy Wilson) 3:11
20. Bob & Marcia: "Young, Gifted and Black" (Weldon Irvine/Nina Simone) 3:15
21. Dave & Ansel Collins: "Double Barrel" (Stephanie McKay/Winston Riley) 2:46
22. Jimmy Cliff: "Many Rivers to Cross" (James Chambers) 2:40

=== Disc 3 ===
1. Desmond Dekker: "You Can Get It if You Really Want" (James Chambers) 2:38
2. Freddie Notes & The Rudies: "Montego Bay" (Jeff Barry/Robert Bloom) 2:24
3. Jimmy Cliff: "Come into My Life" (James Chambers) 2:54
4. Andy Capp: "Pop a Top" (Lynford Anderson/Clancy Eccles) 2:18
5. Niney the Observer: "Blood and Fire" (Winston "Niney" Holness) 3:06
6. Peter Tosh and the Wailers: "400 Years" (Clement "Coxsone" Dodd/Winston McIntosh) 2:33
7. Bob Marley & the Wailers: "Duppy Conqueror" (Bob Marley) 3:45
8. Jimmy Cliff: "Vietnam" (James Chambers) 4:45
9. The Kingstonians: "Singer Man" (Derrick Harriott) 3:02
10. Ken Parker: "Groovin' Out on Life (Groovin' in Style)" (Robert Guidry) 2:48
11. The Stingers: "Give Me Power" (Rainford Hugh Perry) 3:17
12. Bob Marley & the Wailers: "Small Axe" (Bob Marley) 3:55
13. Toots & the Maytals: "Pomps and Pride" (Toots Hibbert) 4:33
14. Jimmy Cliff: "Bongo Man" (James Chambers) 3:59
15. The Pioneers: "Let Your Yeah Be Yeah" (James Chambers) 3:07
16. Johnny Nash: "Guava Jelly" (Bob Marley) 3:16
17. Greyhound: "Black and White" (David Arkin/Earl Robinson) 2:29
18. Horace Andy: "I Feel Good All Over" (Otis Blackwell/Winfield Scott) 3:48
19. The Heptones: "Hypocrite" (Barry Llewellyn/Earl Morgan/Leroy Sibbles) 3:04
20. John Holt: "Stick By Me (And I'll Stick By You)" (John Holt) 3:14
21. Eric Donaldson: "Cherry Oh Baby" (Eric Donaldson) 3:02
22. Bob Marley & the Wailers: "African Herbsman" (Bob Marley) 2:24

=== Disc 4 ===
1. Delroy Wilson: "Better Must Come" (Delroy Wilson) 2:44
2. Bongo Herman & Eric "Bingy Bunny" Lamont: "Know Far I" (Smith) 2:38
3. Junior Byles: "A Place Called Africa" (Kerrie Byles/Rainford Hugh Perry) 2:41
4. Bob Marley & the Wailers: "Trenchtown Rock" (Bob Marley) 3:00
5. The Righteous Flames: "One Love, One Heart" 2:47
6. Johnny Nash" "I Can See Clearly Now" (Johnny Nash) 2:45
7. Zap Pow: "This Is Reggae Music" (Jim Capaldi/D. Madden/M. Williams) 3:06
8. Peter Tosh & The Wailers: "Brand New Second Hand" (Clement "Coxsone" Dodd) 3:13
9. Bob Marley & the Wailers: "Lively Up Yourself" (Bob Marley) 2:52
10. Johnny Nash: "Stir It Up" (Bob Marley) 3:05
11. Dennis Brown: "Money in My Pocket" (Dennis Brown/Joe Gibson) 2:32
12. Toots & the Maytals: "Funky Kingston" (Toots Hibbert) 4:56
13. Slim Smith: "The Time Has Come" (Keith Smith) 4:24
14. Ken Boothe: "Everything I Own" (David Gates) 3:45
15. Dennis Brown: "Westbound Train" (Dennis Brown) 3:01
16. The Willows: "Cool Iron" 2:25
17. The Upsetters: "Justice to the People" (Rainford Hugh Perry) 3:15
18. Big Youth: "S90 Skank" (Manley Buchanan/Keith Hudson) 2:51
19. I-Roy: "Black Man Time" (Augustus Clarke) 3:40
20. Gregory Isaacs: "Bad Da" (Winston "Niney" Holness/Gregory Isaacs) 3:11
21. Ras Michael & the Sons of Negus: "Run Come (Throw Away Your Stoney Heart)" 3:34
22. Burning Spear: "Marcus Garvey" (Philip Fullwood/Winston Rodney) 3:27

== Catalogue and release information ==
- This Is Reggae Music: The Golden Era 1960–1975 (Trojan 06076-80470-2, 2004)
