= The Singles Album (UB40 album) =

Greatest hits album by UB40
- Released: August 1982
- Genre: Reggae
- Label: Graduate
- Producers: Bob Lamb, UB40, Ray "Pablo" Falconer

UB40 chronology
Present Arms in Dub (1981)	The Singles Album (1982)	UB44 (1982)

Professional ratings
Review scores
Source	Rating
Allmusic	link
Robert Christgau	A− link

The Singles Album (cat no. GRADLSP 3) was released in August 1982 and is a compilation LP and the first greatest hits by British reggae band UB40, featuring all of UB40's single releases on Graduate, including the 3-track Dutch 12" single "Tyler".

The album spent 8 weeks on the UK Album Chart, peaking at number 17.

== Track listing ==
_{Side 1}

1. "Food for Thought"
2. "King"
3. "My Way of Thinking"
4. "I Think It's Going to Rain Today"
5. "Dream a Lie"

_{Side 2}

1. "Tyler"
2. "Adella"
3. "Little By Little"
4. "The Earth Dies Screaming (12" Version)"
