= The Harder They Come (soundtrack) =

Soundtrack album by various artists
- Released: July 7, 1972
- Recorded: 1967–1972
- Genres: Rocksteady, ska, reggae
- Length: 39:55
- Label: Island
- Producer: Various

The Harder They Come is the soundtrack album to the film of the same name, released in 1972 in the United Kingdom as Island Records ILPS 9202. It was issued in February 1973 in North America as Mango Records SMAS-7400. It peaked at No. 140 on the US Billboard 200. In 2021, the album was deemed "culturally, historically, or aesthetically significant" by the Library of Congress and selected for preservation in the National Recording Registry.

== Recordings ==
The heart of the soundtrack comes from performances by the film's star, reggae singer Jimmy Cliff. Only the title track "The Harder They Come" was recorded by Cliff specifically for the soundtrack, with three earlier songs by Cliff added. The remainder of the album is a compilation of singles released in Jamaica from the period of 1967 through 1972, assembled by The Harder They Come film director and co-writer, Perry Henzell, from songs by favored reggae singers. In addition to Cliff, these artists include the Melodians, the Slickers, DJ Scotty, and seminal early reggae stars Desmond Dekker and Toots and the Maytals.

Two songs are repeated on side two to end the album. The second version of "You Can Get It If You Really Want" is a dub version of the song mostly minus a few vocals, while the second version of "The Harder They Come" is an alternate take.

== Reception and legacy ==
Professional ratings
Review scores
Source	Rating
AllMusic	5/5 stars
Christgau's Record Guide	A
Encyclopedia of Popular Music	5/5 stars
Martin C. Strong	9/10
The Rolling Stone Record Guide	5/5 stars

The soundtrack became one of the most commercially successful reggae albums of its era, helping introduce songs by Jimmy Cliff, the Maytals, the Melodians, the Slickers, and Scotty to international audiences. Its popularity, together with the success of the film, contributed significantly to reggae's breakthrough beyond Jamaica and established The Harder They Come as a cult classic in many countries. In 2003, the album was ranked number 119 on Rolling Stone magazine's list of the 500 greatest albums of all time, number 122 in a 2012 revision, and number 174 in the 2020 reboot of the list. The album also appears on greatest albums lists from Time and Blender, and was named the 97th best album of the 1970s by Pitchfork. In 2024, Rolling Stone named it the 3rd greatest soundtrack of all time.

In Christgau's Record Guide: Rock Albums of the Seventies (1981), Robert Christgau said the soundtrack "collected the best songs of artists whose music was either unavailable or not rich enough to fill an LP".

On August 5, 2003, Universal Music Group issued a deluxe edition of the album, with the original remastered and reissued on one disc. A bonus disc continued the idea of the original soundtrack itself, compiling additional singles from the early days of reggae, titled Reggae Hit the Town: Crucial Reggae 1968–1972.

== Track listing ==
Side one
No.	Title	Writer(s)	Performer(s)	Length
1.	"You Can Get It If You Really Want"	Jimmy Cliff	Jimmy Cliff	2:40
2.	"Draw Your Brakes"	Derrick Harriott, Texas Dixon, Keith Rowe	Scotty	2:57
3.	"Rivers of Babylon"	Brent Dowe, James McNaughton	The Melodians	4:16
4.	"Many Rivers to Cross"	Jimmy Cliff	Jimmy Cliff	3:02
5.	"Sweet and Dandy"	Frederick Hibbert	The Maytals	3:01
6.	"The Harder They Come"	Jimmy Cliff	Jimmy Cliff	3:41

Side two
No.	Title	Writer(s)	Performer(s)	Length
1.	"Johnny Too Bad"	Trevor Wilson, Winston Bailey, Hylton Beckford, Derrick Crooks	The Slickers	3:04
2.	"007 (Shanty Town)"	Desmond Dekker	Desmond Dekker	2:43
3.	"Pressure Drop"	Frederick Hibbert	The Maytals	3:44
4.	"Sitting in Limbo"	Jimmy Cliff, Guillermo Bright-Plummer	Jimmy Cliff	4:57
5.	"You Can Get It If You Really Want" (partial instrumental)	Jimmy Cliff	Jimmy Cliff	2:43
6.	"The Harder They Come" (alternate)	Jimmy Cliff	Jimmy Cliff	3:07

2003 reissue bonus disc
No.	Title	Writer(s)	Performer(s)	Length
1.	"Israelites"	Desmond Dacres, Leslie Kong	Desmond Dekker and the Aces	2:37
2.	"My Conversation"	Keith Smith, Edward Lee	The Uniques	2:41
3.	"Do the Reggay"	Frederick Hibbert	The Maytals	3:18
4.	"Viet Nam"	Jimmy Cliff	Jimmy Cliff	4:53
5.	"I Can See Clearly Now"	Johnny Nash	Johnny Nash	2:42
6.	"Reggae Hit the Town"	Leonard Dillon	The Ethiopians	2:24
7.	"Double Barrel"	Winston Riley	Dave and Ansel Collins	2:50
8.	"It Mek"	Desmond Dacres, Leslie Kong	Desmond Dekker and the Aces	2:32
9.	"Sweet Sensation"	Renford Cogle	The Melodians	3:42
10.	"Let Your Yeah Be Yeah"	Jimmy Cliff	Jimmy Cliff	3:05
11.	"Cherry Oh Baby"	Eric Donaldson	Eric Donaldson	3:02
12.	"Monkey Spanner"	Winston Riley, Ansel Collins	Dave and Ansel Collins	2:45
13.	"54-46 (That's My Number)"	Frederick Hibbert	The Maytals	2:58
14.	"It's My Delight"	Brent Dowe, Trevor McNaughton	The Melodians	3:14
15.	"Wonderful World, Beautiful People"	Jimmy Cliff	Jimmy Cliff	3:15
16.	"Pomp and Pride"	Frederick Hibbert	The Maytals	4:28
17.	"Guava Jelly"	Bob Marley	Johnny Nash	3:15
18.	"The Bigger They Come the Harder They Fall"	Jimmy Cliff	Jimmy Cliff	3:12

== Personnel ==
- Jimmy Cliff – vocals
- Dave and Ansel Collins – vocals reissue tracks
- Desmond Dekker – vocals
- Eric Donaldson – vocals reissue tracks
- The Ethiopians – vocals reissue tracks
- The Maytals – vocals
- The Melodians – vocals
- Johnny Nash – vocals reissue tracks
- Scotty – vocals
- The Slickers – vocals
- The Uniques – vocals reissue tracks
- Jackie Jackson – bass guitar
- Winston Grennan – drums
- Beverley's All-Stars – instruments
- Gully Bright – producer
- Jimmy Cliff – producer
- Tommy Cowan – producer reissue tracks
- Larry Fallon – producer reissue tracks
- Derrick Harriott – producer
- Leslie Kong – producer
- Bunny Lee – producer reissue tracks
- Byron Lee – producer
- Warwick Lyn – producer reissue tracks
- Johnny Nash – producer reissue tracks
- Winston Riley – producer reissue tracks

=== Reissue personnel ===
- Dana Smart – supervisor
- Pat Lawrence – executive producer
- Vartan – reissue art director
- John Bryant – cover illustrator
- Gavin Larsen – digital mastering

== Charts ==
Chart performance for The Harder They Come
Chart (2025)	Peak position
Greek Albums (IFPI)	5
UK Album Downloads (Official Charts)	72
