= Rayon (disambiguation) =

Rayon is a manufactured fibre.

Rayon may also refer to:

- Acetate rayon, an alternative term for cellulose acetate
- Rayón (disambiguation), the name of several places in Mexico
- Raion, an administrative division of some post-Soviet states
- Operation Rayon, Allied deception operation in WWII

== People ==
- Rayon Griffith (born 1979), Guyanese cricketer
- Rayon Thomas (born 1981), Guyanese cricketer
- Ignacio López Rayón (1773–1832), general in the Mexican War of Independence
- Roy Rayon (born 1959), Jamaican singer
