= Labour of Love =

Studio album by UB40
- Released: 12 September 1983
- Recorded: 1982–83
- Studio: The Manor Mobile (on tour)
- Genres: Reggae; post-punk
- Length: 39:52
- Labels: DEP International/Virgin (UK); A&M (US)
- Producers: UB40; Ray "Pablo" Falconer

UB40 chronology
UB44 (1982)	Labour of Love (1983)	Geffery Morgan (1984)

Singles from Labour of Love
- 1. "Red Red Wine" Released: 8 August 1983; 2. "Please Don't Make Me Cry" Released: 3 October 1983; 3. "Many Rivers to Cross" Released: 28 November 1983; 4. "Cherry Oh Baby" Released: 27 February 1984

Labour of Love is the fourth studio album by the English reggae band UB40, and their first album of cover versions. Released in the UK on 12 September 1983, the album is best known for containing the song "Red Red Wine", a worldwide number-one single, but it also includes three further UK top 20 hits, "Please Don't Make Me Cry", "Many Rivers to Cross" and "Cherry Oh Baby". The album reached number one in the UK, New Zealand and the Netherlands and the top five in Canada, but only reached number 39 in the US on its original release, before re-entering the Billboard 200 in 1988 and peaking at number 14 as a result of "Red Red Wine"'s delayed success in the US.

Following the record's success, UB40 have since released three further albums of cover versions under the Labour of Love title.

== Background and recording ==
The album consists of cover versions of ten of the group's favourite songs by reggae artists from the period 1969 to 1972. Guitarist Robin Campbell drew up a list of possible tracks which were then whittled down to a final choice of ten following discussion among the band members. Campbell told UK music magazine NME, "It's a collection of songs we knew as reggae songs. We'd wanted to do it for years, we wanted it to be our first album... Why we recorded them was because they were part of an era for us, what we were into." In another interview with Melody Maker, drummer Jim Brown explained that the band were being pressured to deliver a new album, but didn't have enough original material completed, so it seemed an ideal time to revisit the idea of making an album of cover versions. UB40 had recently opened their own studio, the Abattoir, and Campbell spoke about how the combination of not having to write songs and having their own studio in which to produce them had resulted in a happy environment during the album's recording: "We could relax with this; there wasn't the pressure of it being our own material. We experimented with several things like LinnDrums and synthesised basslines. It was a lot more fun."

The group were apparently unaware during recording that the most famous track on the record had not originally been a reggae song. Ali Campbell told Billboard, "Nobody was as shocked as we were to find out that Neil Diamond wrote 'Red Red Wine'... To me, it was always a Tony Tribe song. He sang it." The album and 12" version of "Red Red Wine" included a toasted verse by Astro, later copied and included by Diamond in his live performances of the song.

The band defended their decision to make an album of cover versions, stating that they had always wanted to make reggae for a wide audience. Robin Campbell said, "We actually set out in the first place to popularise reggae. That was our intention." His brother Ali added, "What we want to do is play heavy dub reggae. But if we came straight out doing that, it would never have gotten on the radio. We commercialize our music all the time; it's been a series of compromises."

== Labour of Love film ==
Accompanying the album, a 30-minute film shot in black and white, also entitled Labour of Love, was released on VHS on 27 September 1984. It was directed by Bernard Rose and written by Rose and the group's saxophone player Brian Travers. The story followed a fictional version of the lives of the band members, their relationships with family and girlfriends, and their jobs in a junkyard, with all roles in the film played by the band and their friends. The plot focused on the rivalry between two brothers (played by the band's Ali and Robin Campbell) trying to win the affections of the same girl (played by keyboard player Mickey Virtue's real-life girlfriend at the time, Bernadette McNamara). The film featured songs from the album as its soundtrack, and the music videos for the singles "Red Red Wine", "Please Don't Make Me Cry" and "Cherry Oh Baby" were lifted directly from the film. Rose would go on to direct music videos for Frankie Goes to Hollywood and Bronski Beat before becoming a Hollywood movie director.

== Artwork ==
The album's cover art was created by Ken Ansell of the Design Clinic and featured two collages of images that illustrated each of the songs on the album (the five songs on side one were illustrated on the front cover, and the five songs on side two on the back cover). It was the first time that UB40 had not had any input on the artwork on one of their albums, but they were on tour in the US at the time and Virgin Records, the parent company of UB40's DEP International label, could not afford to wait until they returned for the sleeve to be designed. As Ansell recounted to Classic Pop magazine in 2017, "We pitched the idea to Virgin of creating an illustration for each song so that as and when they were released as singles we would have ready-made images. Fortunately, on their return the band liked the concept and we went ahead."

== Critical reception ==
Professional ratings
Review scores
Source	Rating
AllMusic	4.5/5 stars
Robert Christgau	A−
Mojo	4/5 stars
Q	3/5 stars
Rolling Stone	4/5 stars

Reviews of the album in the UK were generally positive. In Melody Maker Colin Irwin expressed his irritation at his fellow journalists' insistence on bringing up the band's left-wing political views in articles about them, saying, "UB40's mode of escape from these glib cliches is to make their own highly specialised version of Bowie's Pin-Ups or Ferry's These Foolish Things. Labour of Love is an album of songs that touched and inspired UB40 in their formative years and you know something? It's beautiful. What may appear to be a simple form of escapism has in fact galvanised this band, snatching them out of their increasingly confined introversion and seemingly opened their eyes to bold new horizons... To make comparisons with the originals is to miss the point. Sometimes you just have to step back to leap forward." Richard Cook of NME was more reserved, feeling that UB40's versions didn't always have the impact of the originals: "I think the Campbells' memories might be deceiving them. The music of the era they recall was always far ruder and tougher and far more percussive than their honey-smooth treatments imply." However, he welcomed the change from the political stance of the group's own songs, calling the cover versions "gentle, sometimes caressing, a shallow groove far preferable to the morose intensity of the group's usual tug at the lapels... Everything blurs perfectly there, the rippling draft of the rhythm, the stewed warmth of the saxophone, all melting around the dry edge of the vocal. Sometimes UB hit the spot of rock-reggae with absolute accuracy, and its power to turn ears is far superior to the weight of their customary glam pamphleteering."

In the US, J.D. Considine of Rolling Stone also gave the album a positive review: while criticising the vocals, he also noted that "UB40's ingenuity and unmistakable affection for the material keeps the comparisons from being too lopsided" and felt that each song "retains the spirit of the original while also capturing a modern feel". In Rolling Stone's end-of-year round-up of 1984's key albums, Kurt Loder stated that "UB40 ... not only makes these songs their own but brings them into the Eighties without betraying their buoyant period spirit... This album's title is an accurate assessment of its approach. A thoroughly enjoyable record." Robert Christgau professed his initial dislike of an album of cover versions, before revising his opinion after repeated listens, admitting that "it hit me once again that reggae tunes can take a long, long time to hook in". In his retrospective review for AllMusic, David Jeffries called Labour of Love "a near perfect album, one filled with warmth and an infectious love of the music it's covering", and that even if its most famous track had been overplayed on the radio, "the end-to-end LP flow is classic while recontextualizing 'Red Red Wine' for the better".

Reviews of the 2015 deluxe edition remained positive, but lamented that Labour of Love didn't have the intensity of the band's earlier, more political, records. Ian Harrison of Q said of the album, "It's still quality, but it's hard not to mourn the earlier militancy". Lois Wilson of Mojo agreed, observing that "Revisited now, it seems caught up with nostalgia... On the back of Labour of Love's huge international success, UB40 became reggae's world ambassadors and their focus shifted; they'd make political records again but never anything as potent as Signing Off or Present Arms, instead relying on the surefire hit potential of further cover albums".

=== Accolades ===
In 1989, it was ranked number 98 on Rolling Stone magazine's list of the "100 Greatest Albums of the Eighties".

== Track listing ==
Side one
No.	Title	Writer(s)	Original artist	Length
1.	"Cherry Oh Baby"	Eric Donaldson	Eric Donaldson	3:18
2.	"Keep on Moving"	Lee "Scratch" Perry, Curtis Mayfield	The Impressions; modelled after the reggae cover by The Wailers	4:37
3.	"Please Don't Make Me Cry"	Winston Tucker	Winston Tucker	3:26
4.	"Sweet Sensation"	Leslie Kong	The Melodians	3:42
5.	"Johnny Too Bad"	Roy Beckford, Winston "Shadow" Bailey, Delroy Wilson, Derrick Crooks	The Slickers	4:57

Side two
No.	Title	Writer(s)	Original artist	Length
6.	"Red Red Wine"	Neil Diamond	Neil Diamond; modelled after the reggae cover by Tony Tribe	5:21
7.	"Guilty"	Isaac Hayes	Tiger	3:16
8.	"She Caught the Train"	Joe Monsano	Ray Martell	3:17
9.	"Version Girl"	Boy Friday	Boy Friday	3:27
10.	"Many Rivers to Cross"	Jimmy Cliff	Jimmy Cliff	4:31

=== 2015 deluxe edition ===
Disc One

As original album.

Disc Two

Singles & B-Sides
No.	Title	Writer(s)	Additional information	Length
1.	"Red Red Wine" (7" Version)	Neil Diamond		3:03
2.	"Sufferin'" (Dub Mix)	UB40	B-side of "Red Red Wine"	8:28
3.	"Many Rivers to Cross" (7" Version)	Jimmy Cliff		3:50
4.	"Food for Thought" (Live)	UB40	B-side of "Please Don't Make Me Cry"	4:43
5.	"Johnny Too Bad" (Unexpurgated Version)	Roy Beckford, Winston "Shadow" Bailey, Delroy Wilson, Derrick Crooks	B-side of 12" of "Many Rivers to Cross"	5:31
6.	"Cherry Oh Baby" (Dub Mix)	Eric Donaldson	12" single	5:44
7.	"Frilla" (12" Version)	UB40	B-side of 12" of "Cherry Oh Baby"	7:00
8.	"I've Got Mine" (Extended Version)	UB40	12" version of non-album single	6:04
9.	"Dubmobile"	UB40	B-side of "I've Got Mine"	3:45

Disc Three

BBC Live Sessions

BBC Radio 1 Session 14/04/83

1. "Red Red Wine" – 3:24
2. "Please Don't Make Me Cry" – 3:16

BBC Radio 1 in Concert 7/1/84

3. "One in Ten" – 4:51
4. "Keep on Moving" – 4:54
5. "Don't Let It Pass You By" – 7:14
6. "Love Is All Is Alright" – 3:58
7. "Johnny Too Bad" – 4:57
8. "Sweet Sensation" – 4:03
9. "Cherry Oh Baby" – 3:50
10. "Red Red Wine" – 5:26
11. "Please Don't Make Me Cry" – 4:28
12. "Present Arms" – 4:59
13. "Tyler" – 6:15

== Personnel ==
UB40

- James Brown – drums, syncussion
- Ali Campbell – lead vocals, guitar
- Robin Campbell – guitar, vocals, lead vocals on "Sweet Sensation"
- Earl Falconer – bass
- Norman Hassan – percussion, vocals, lead vocals on "Johnny Too Bad" and "Guilty"
- Brian Travers – saxophones
- Michael Virtue – keyboards
- Astro – toasting, rhyming, percussion

Additional personnel

- Mo Birch – vocals on "Many Rivers to Cross"
- Josh Fifer – trumpet on "She Caught the Train"
- Jaki Graham – vocals on "Many Rivers to Cross"
- Jackie Mittoo – additional keyboards on "Johnny Too Bad", "She Caught the Train" and "Many Rivers to Cross"
- Ruby Turner – vocals on "Many Rivers to Cross"

Production

- Produced by UB40 and Ray "Pablo" Falconer
- Engineering and assistant production by Howard Gray
- Assistant engineering by Alan Caves
- Tape operation by Keith Nixon
- Design by Kenneth Ansell and illustration by David Dragon for Bitter and Twisted

== Charts ==
=== Weekly charts ===
Chart (1983–84)	Peak position
Canada Top Albums/CDs (RPM)	5
German Albums (Offizielle Top 100)	29
Dutch Albums (Album Top 100)	1
New Zealand Albums (RMNZ)	1
UK Albums (Official Charts)	1
US Billboard 200	39
Chart (1988)	Peak position
US Billboard 200	14
Chart (2022)	Peak position
US Reggae Albums (Billboard)	6

=== Year-end charts ===
Chart (1983)	Ranking
Dutch Albums (MegaCharts)	14
New Zealand Albums (RMNZ)	41
UK Albums (Gallup)	12
Chart (1984)	Ranking
Dutch Albums (MegaCharts)	23
UK Albums (Gallup)	45

== Certifications ==
Region	Certification	Certified units/sales
Canada (Music Canada)	Platinum	100,000^{^}
Germany (BVMI)	Gold	250,000^{^}
Netherlands (NVPI)	Platinum	100,000^{^}
New Zealand (RMNZ)	Platinum	15,000^{^}
United Kingdom (BPI)	2× Platinum	600,000^{^}
United States (RIAA)	Platinum	1,000,000^{^}
^{^} Shipments figures based on certification alone.
