= The UB40 File =

Compilation album by UB40
- Genre: Reggae
- Label: Graduate
- Producer: Bob Lamb, UB40, Ray 'Pablo' Falconer

The UB40 File is a compilation album of all of UB40's 1980 Graduate recordings. The album first appeared as a double vinyl LP in 1985 and features all the tracks from Signing Off on Record One, the 3 tracks from the 12" single that accompanied Signing Off on the A-side of Record Two with the tracks released as singles that did not feature on the debut album on B-side.

A CD followed in 1986. The band's official website lists "The Earth Dies Screaming" and "Dream a Lie" as being the 12" extended versions.

The album is very similar to the 1983 compilation More UB40 Music released in The Netherlands.

AllMusic rated it four and a half stars and noted, "this set captures them at their most militant and experimental."

== Track listings ==
=== CD ===
1. Tyler
2. King
3. Burden of Shame
4. I Think It's Going to Rain Today
5. Food for Thought
6. Signing Off
7. Madame Medusa
8. Strange Fruit
9. My Way of Thinking
10. The Earth Dies Screaming
11. Dream a Lie

=== Double LP ===
Record 1, Side 1

1. Tyler
2. King
3. 12 Bar
4. Burden of Shame

Record 1, Side 2

1. Adella
2. I Think It's Going to Rain Today
3. 25%
4. Food for Thought
5. Little by Little
6. Signing Off

Record 2, Side 1

1. Madame Medusa
2. Strange Fruit
3. Reefer Madness

Record 2, Side 2

1. My Way of Thinking
2. The Earth Dies Screaming
3. Dream a Lie
