= Food for Thought (song) =

1980 single by UB40

Single by UB40

from the album Signing Off
- A-side: "King"
- Released: 1 February 1980
- Recorded: 21–24 December 1979
- Studio: Bob Lamb's "Home of the Hits", Moseley, Birmingham
- Genre: Reggae
- Length: 4:10
- Label: Graduate
- Songwriter: UB40
- Producers: Bob Lamb; UB40

UB40 singles chronology
"King" / "Food for Thought" (1980)	"My Way of Thinking" / "I Think It's Going to Rain Today" (1980)

Official video
- "Food for Thought" on YouTube

"Food for Thought" is a song by British reggae band UB40, released as their debut single in February 1980 from their album Signing Off. Released as a double A-side with "King", it peaked at number four on the UK Singles Chart.

== Composition and recording ==
The inspiration for "Food for Thought" is said to have come from the genocide in Cambodia, then known as Kampuchea, undertaken by members of the ruling Communist Party, known as the Khmer Rouge, whose totalitarian government saw between 1.5 and 3 million people killed between 1975 and 1979. The song's lyrics were written by Robin Campbell with help from his father, folksinger Ian Campbell, and relate to "the hypocrisy of Christmas, the fact that there are starving people in Africa and here we are all sat around eating our Christmas dinner and praising the Lord". After having written the lyrics, Campbell brought them to the rest of the band who then together worked on the music. The song was originally called "The Christmas Song", before one of the roadies suggested "Food for Thought" would be a better title.

As the band could not afford to record in a studio, the whole of the Signing Off album was recorded at producer Bob Lamb's own home, a bedsit in Moseley which later became known as the "Home of the Hits". The album was recorded over three separate sessions, with this single being recorded in the first session between 21 and 24 December 1979.

Prior to recording the song, the band had a debate over the subtlety of the lyrics, with Campbell since regretting the ambiguity of them, saying "I find it incredible that people can’t understand it and that upsets me. I think the symbolism’s quite obvious". This is perhaps aggravated by the fact that the opening lyric "Ivory Madonna" has often been misheard as "I'm a prima donna" or "I believe in Donna", which Campbell has found amusing but also concerning over how the song's message has been lost on many people.

== Release ==
"Food for Thought" was released as a double A-side single with "King" on local independent label Graduate Records. (Note: The single has sometimes been incorrectly attributed to being the first single released on Graduate Records. However, as per its catalogue number, GRAD 6, it was the label's sixth single, with local hard rock band Eazie Ryder releasing the first over a year prior to "Food for Thought".) The single lists "King" as the first A-side and Bob Lamb has explained that "Food for Thought" was originally the B-side and that "King" "was always gonna be the main song". However, "Food for Thought" was picked up by radio disc jockeys and therefore gained more airplay than "King" because "it was quicker and chirpier, more dancey, more of a radio track".

The original single version of "Food for Thought" is slightly shorter compared to the Signing Off album version, with the album version including a break using a synthesiser reverb (an early example of their mixing techniques that can be found on their remix album Present Arms in Dub).

Released at the beginning of February 1980, the single entered the UK Singles Chart a month later in the first week of March and reached it peak of number four six weeks later in the second week of April. It became the first single to make the top ten without the backing of a major record company. The single performed even better in New Zealand where it topped the charts for four weeks and became the first hit there on an English independent label.

== Charts ==
Chart (1980)	Peak position
Australia (Kent Music Report)	36
Ireland (IRMA)	10
Netherlands (Single Top 100)	46
New Zealand (Recorded Music NZ)	1
UK Singles (Official Charts)	4
UK Independent Singles (Record Business)	1

== Certifications ==
Region	Certification	Certified units/sales
New Zealand (RMNZ)	Platinum	30,000^{‡}
United Kingdom (BPI)	Silver	250,000^{^}
^{^} Shipments figures based on certification alone.^{‡} Sales+streaming figures based on certification alone.

== Live version ==
"Food for Thought"

Single by UB40

from the album UB40 Live
- B-side: "The Piper Calls the Tune"
- Released: April 1983
- Recorded: February 1982, Ireland
- Genre: Reggae
- Length: 4:40
- Label: DEP International; Virgin
- Songwriter: UB40
- Producers: UB40; Ray "Pablo" Falconer

UB40 singles chronology
"I've Got Mine" (1983)	"Food for Thought" (1983)	"Red Red Wine" (1983)

Whilst on tour in Ireland in February 1982, UB40 recorded their first live album, UB40 Live, which would be released a year later in February 1983. To promote the release of the live album, the live version of "Food for Thought" was released as a single in several European countries. Both the album and the single performed particularly well in the Netherlands, charting in the top five of their respective charts.

Whilst this single was not released in the UK, the live version of "Food for Thought" was released as the B-side to "Many Rivers to Cross" in November 1983 as the third single from their fourth studio album Labour of Love.

=== Charts ===
Chart (1983)	Peak position
Belgium (Ultratop 50 Flanders)	20
Netherlands (Dutch Top 40)	4
Netherlands (Single Top 100)	5
