= Cherry Oh Baby =

1971 single by Eric Donaldson

Single by Eric Donaldson

from the album Eric Donaldson
- B-side: "Sir Charmers Special"
- Released: 1971
- Studio: Dynamic Sounds, Kingston, Jamaica
- Genre: Reggae
- Length: 3:02
- Label: Dynamic
- Songwriter: Eric Donaldson
- Producers: Bunny Lee; Tommy Cowan

"Cherry Oh Baby" is a song written and originally recorded by Jamaican singer Eric Donaldson in 1971. Released on Dynamic Sounds (a subsidiary of Trojan Records), it became the label's biggest seller, with the song winning the 1971 Jamaica Song Festival. The recording was produced by Bunny Lee and Tommy Cowan and featured backing by Inner Circle.

The song was covered by the Rolling Stones for their 1976 album Black and Blue. However, "Cherry Oh Baby" has become better known after it was covered by UB40 in 1983.

== UB40 version ==
"Cherry Oh Baby"

Single by UB40

from the album Labour of Love
- B-side: "Frilla"
- Released: 27 February 1984
- Genre: Reggae fusion
- Length: 3:16
- Label: DEP International
- Songwriter: Eric Donaldson
- Producers: UB40; Ray "Pablo" Falconer

UB40 singles chronology
"Many Rivers to Cross" (1983)	"Cherry Oh Baby" (1984)	"If It Happens Again" (1984)

Released in February 1984, "Cherry Oh Baby" was the fourth and final single from UB40's fourth album Labour of Love. It peaked at number twelve on the UK Singles Chart.

=== Track listing ===
7": DEP International / DEP 10

1. "Cherry Oh Baby" – 3:16
2. "Frilla" – 5:06

12": DEP International / DEP 10-12

1. "Cherry Oh Baby" (Dub Mix) – 5:42
2. "Frilla" – 6:58

=== Charts ===
Chart (1984)	Peak position
Belgium (Ultratop 50 Flanders)	22
Ireland (IRMA)	7
Netherlands (Dutch Top 40)	7
Netherlands (Single Top 100)	7
Paraguay (UPI)	1
UK Singles (OCC)	12
Zimbabwe (ZIMA)	20

=== Certifications ===
Region	Certification	Certified units/sales
New Zealand (RMNZ)	Platinum	30,000^{‡}
United Kingdom (BPI)	Silver	200,000^{‡}
^{‡} Sales+streaming figures based on certification alone.
