= More UB40 Music =

Compilation album by UB40
- Released: 1983
- Genre: Reggae
- Length: 93:58
- Label: Graduate
- Producer: Bob Lamb, UB40, Ray 'Pablo' Falconer

More UB40 Music is a compilation album of all of UB40's 1980 Graduate recordings. The album first appeared as a Dutch import on double vinyl LP (cat no. GRADLP 44) and cassette (cat no. GRADMC 44) in 1983 and features all the tracks from Signing Off, the three tracks from the 12" single that accompanied Signing Off along with the tracks released as singles that didn't feature on the debut album. The tracks from their 2nd and 3rd double A-side singles are all included in their 12" extended versions.

An eight-track CD (GRAD CD 4) followed in 1985 featuring two tracks from each side of the original release (including all four 12" versions).

The album is very similar to the 1986 compilation The UB40 File. It was rated three stars by AllMusic.

== Track listing (LP/tape) ==
_{Side 1}

1. Little By Little - 3:44
2. Burden of Shame - 7:02
3. 12 Bar - 4:25
4. I Think It's Going to Rain Today (12" version) - 7:30

_{Side 2}

1. Madam Medusa - 12:54
2. 25% - 3:34
3. King - 4:32
4. My Way of Thinking (12" version) - 6:52

_{Side 3}

1. Tyler - 5:53
2. Signing Off - 4:28
3. Strange Fruit - 4:04
4. Dream a Lie (12" version) - 7:52

_{Side 4}

1. Adella - 3:27
2. Food for Thought - 4:12
3. Reefer Madness - 5:09
4. The Earth Dies Screaming (12" version) - 8:20

== Track listing (CD) ==
1. Burden of Shame
2. I Think It's Going to Rain Today (12" version)
3. Madam Medusa
4. My Way of Thinking (12" version)
5. Tyler
6. Dream a Lie (12" version)
7. Food for Thought
8. The Earth Dies Screaming (12" version)
