= Bournemouth (disambiguation) =

Bournemouth is a large coastal resort town in the Borough of Bournemouth in Dorset, England.

Bournemouth may also refer to:

- AFC Bournemouth, an English football team
- AFC Bournemouth Women, a women's English football team
- Bournemouth (UK Parliament constituency), a former United Kingdom Parliamentary constituency
- Bournemouth F.C., an English football team
- Bournemouth railway station, the main railway station serving the town of Bournemouth
- Bournemouth, in the List of British airships

== See also ==
- Bournemouth Airport
- Bournemouth School
- Bournemouth University
- Bournemouth Gardens
