= Stop That Train (song) =

Single by Keith & Tex
- B-side: "Bobby Ellis – Feeling Peckish"
- Released: 1967
- Genre: Reggae, Rocksteady
- Length: 3:18
- Label: Move & Groove Records
- Songwriter: C. Campbell
- Producers: K. Rowe, T. Dixon, D. Harriott

"Stop That Train" is a 1965 ska song by Jamaican band The Spanishtonians (also known as the Spanish Town Skabeats), that has been covered and sampled by numerous artists. Its most famous cover was its first, a 1967 cover by Keith & Tex. That rendition was in turn sampled by various artists, including Scotty, the Beastie Boys and Vanilla Ice. The song has also been covered by Bim Sherman and Style Scott with Dub Syndicate, and there is a discomix version of the tune from Clint Eastwood & General Saint and Don Campbell.

== Lyrics ==
The original version of "Stop That Train" is sung from the point of view of a woman whose boyfriend is leaving by train for a long absence. She yells at the conductor, apparently in vain, to "stop that train", because she wants to join him on board.

== Keith & Tex version ==
Jamaican duo Keith & Tex covered the song in 1967, in their signature rocksteady style. Their version flipped the song's genders, changing the lyrics from "my baby he is leaving" to "my baby she is leaving". The song became Keith & Tex's biggest hit.

=== Samples ===
Several dub versions of the song were recorded, which sampled the Keith & Tex version. The most notable was "Draw Your Brakes" by Scotty, which appeared on the classic soundtrack album to the 1972 film The Harder They Come. Another dub version was the 1972 "Cool Breeze" by Big Youth.

The Keith & Tex version was also sampled by the Beastie Boys, on the section called "Stop That Train" from their 1989 song B-Boy Bouillabaisse.

It was also sampled by rapper Vanilla Ice, in a 1991 single also entitled "Stop That Train".

== Other covers ==
The Jamaican reggae duo Clint Eastwood & General Saint recorded a cover version of "Stop That Train", which was released as a single in 1983, and was the title track of their 1983 album Stop That Train. Their version replaced the original song's verses with an interpolation of the folk song "500 Miles", as well as the lyrics "Hey mister postman, bring back my woman".

British reggae singer Don Campbell, along with General Saint, recorded a cover version of "Stop That Train" in 1994, as "Saint & Campbell". Their version had a house music influence, and replaced the original song's verses with new lyrics sung in a toasting style.
