= Please Don't Make Me Cry =

1970 single by Winston Groovy

Single by Winston Groovy
- B-side: "Motion on the Ocean"
- Released: April 1970
- Studio: Chalk Farm, London
- Genre: Reggae
- Length: 3:26
- Label: Torpedo
- Songwriter: Winston Groovy
- Producer: Lambert Briscoe

Winston Groovy singles chronology
"Tennessee Waltz" (1970)	"Please Don't Make Me Cry" (1970)	"I Wanna Be Loved" (1971)

"Please Don't Make Me Cry" is a song written and originally recorded by Winston Groovy in 1970. It was first released on Torpedo Records and went on to become the label's most notable release. The song was re-recorded by Groovy in 1974 for Trojan Records and produced by Sidney Crooks. It was released on the Trojan subsidiary label Explosion in March 1974 which helped the song gain more recognition.

== UB40 version ==
"Please Don't Make Me Cry"

Single by UB40

from the album Labour of Love
- B-side: "Sufferin'"
- Released: 3 October 1983
- Genre: Reggae fusion
- Length: 3:32
- Label: DEP International (UK); A&M (US)
- Songwriter: Winston Groovy
- Producers: Ray "Pablo" Falconer; UB40

UB40 singles chronology
"Red Red Wine" (1983)	"Please Don't Make Me Cry" (1983)	"Many Rivers to Cross" (1983)

The most well-known recorded version of the song is by reggae group UB40, and was the follow-up single to their chart-topping cover of Neil Diamond's "Red Red Wine". Both singles were taken from the group's 1983 album Labour of Love. The single peaked at number 10 on the singles chart in the UK, becoming their second consecutive Top 10 hit (sixth overall). It also appeared on the group's greatest hits album The Very Best of UB40 in 2000.

=== Music video ===
A music video was also filmed for "Please Don't Make Me Cry". It was directed by Bernard Rose and UB40's Brian Travers, and features Ali and Robin Campbell fighting in a boxing ring. It was part of a concept for the Labour of Love album where the two Campbells play two brothers rivalling for the affection of the same girl. The video "Red Red Wine" had been the first part of the concept, and the band had been doubtful Top of the Pops would show that video due to scenes of drinking and pickpocketing, but, most likely due to the fact the song topped the charts, the video was shown. They had been hopeful the video for "Please Don't Make Me Cry" would be able to be shown, but Top of the Pops refused to show the video and on ITV only an edited version was shown. A video album also entitled Labour of Love featuring clips for a number of songs from the studio album was released in 1984.

=== Charts ===
Chart (1983)	Peak position
Belgium (Ultratop 50 Flanders)	11
Canada Top Singles (RPM)	35
Ireland (IRMA)	6
Netherlands (Dutch Top 40)	4
Netherlands (Single Top 100)	1
New Zealand (Recorded Music NZ)	41
UK Singles (Official Charts)	10

== Certifications ==
Region	Certification	Certified units/sales
New Zealand (RMNZ)	Platinum	30,000^{‡}
^{‡} Sales+streaming figures based on certification alone.
