= Signing Off =

Studio album by UB40
- Released: 29 August 1980
- Recorded: 21–24 December 1979, 31 March–10 April 1980, 16 June–1 July 1980, 18–20 July 1980
- Studios: Bob Lamb's "Home of the Hits", Moseley, Birmingham; The Music Centre
- Genres: Reggae, dub
- Length: 66:22
- Label: Graduate Records
- Producers: Bob Lamb, Ray "Pablo" Falconer, UB40

UB40 chronology
Signing Off (1980)	Present Arms (1981)

Singles from Signing Off
- 1. "King"/"Food for Thought" Released: 1 February 1980; 2. "My Way of Thinking"/"I Think It's Going to Rain Today" Released: 6 June 1980

Signing Off is the debut album by British reggae band UB40, released in the UK on 29 August 1980 by Dudley-based independent label Graduate Records. It was an immediate success in their home country, reaching number 2 on the UK albums chart, and made UB40 one of the many popular reggae bands in Britain, several years before the band found international fame. The politically-concerned lyrics struck a chord in a country with widespread public divisions over high unemployment, the policies of the recently elected Conservative party under Margaret Thatcher, and the rise of the National Front party, while the record's dub-influenced rhythms reflected the late 1970s influence in British pop music of West Indian music introduced by immigrants from the Caribbean after the Second World War, particularly reggae and ska – this was typified by the 2 Tone movement, at that point at the height of its success and led by fellow West Midlands act The Specials, with whom UB40 drew comparisons due to their multiracial band line-up and socialist views.

Still considered by many fans and music critics to be UB40's best album, Signing Off was reissued for its 30th anniversary in 2010 as a "collector's edition" containing bonus tracks and a DVD of the videos for the singles plus television footage of the band from the time of the album's release.

== Recording ==
After forming in 1978, the members of UB40 made an agreement to spend the next year doing nothing more than learning their instruments and practising their songs until they felt they were good enough. Saxophonist Brian Travers said, "We commandeered a cellar and started rehearsing every day, nine till five. Our first experiences of playing an instrument started together, and we'd humiliate each other over mistakes. But we were very serious about our music. It was a year before we played our first gig. It was in an upper room at the 'Hare and Hounds' [a pub] in Kings Heath, Birmingham. We played the whole of Signing Off because they were the only songs we knew."

Towards the end of 1979 the band felt confident enough to start recording their songs, and approached local musician Bob Lamb as he was the only person they knew with any recording experience. Lamb had been the drummer with the Steve Gibbons Band for much of the 1970s and was a well-known figure within the Birmingham music scene. He remembered that "'King' was the very first song they ever played to me, and it just blew my mind basically, to realise a bunch of kids could make a sound like that... it blew me away. And that was it for me, I was hooked, it was a bit like Elvis walks in or something, you know, it was one of those moments." However, as the band were unable to afford a proper recording studio, the album was recorded in Lamb's own home at the time, a ground-floor flat in a house on Cambridge Road in Birmingham's Moseley district that later became affectionately known as the "Home of the Hits". Lamb would later use the money he earned from the album's success to build a proper recording studio, Highbury Studio, in an old cricket bat factory in nearby Kings Heath, which remained under his ownership until his retirement in 2010 – during the 1980s and 90s he would go on to produce the early demos for Duran Duran and work on the debut albums by fellow Birmingham natives Ruby Turner, The Lilac Time and Ocean Colour Scene. However, in an interview to mark Signing Off's 30th anniversary, Brian Travers recalled just how basic the recording facilities of the original Cambridge Road "studio" really were:

"Because we couldn't afford a studio and he was the only guy we knew who knew how to record music, we did the album in his bedsit. I remember he had his bed on stilts. So underneath the bed was a sofa and mixing desk. And so we recorded the album there on an eight-track machine, with the same 50p coin going through the electric meter continually because we'd booted the lock off it. And, with it being a bedsit and us being eight in the band, we'd record the saxophone in the kitchen—because there was a bit of resonance off the walls, a bit of reverb—before putting the machine effects on it. While the percussion—the tambourines, the congas, the drums—we'd do in the back yard. Which is why you can hear birds singing on some of the tracks! You know, because it was in the daytime we'd be shouting across the fences 'Keep it DOWN! We're RECORDING!'"

Producer Lamb described the somewhat relaxed recording process:

"We had a huge garden [...] that was completely overgrown with tall grass. There were various encampments out in the long grass [...] of UB40 posses, various bunches of people... They didn't just turn up at the studio alone, they always brought maybe 20 people with them, of all walks of life. So whilst we were in the studio working there was this kind of garden party going on at the same time, so whoever wasn't doing anything at the time was in the garden indulging in whatever, in the long grass in the hot summer. So the point is that everybody had a lot of fun making it, and you can hear it on the record. You can hear the summer... you can hear the birds singing."

and also remembered how easy it was to make the album:

"Nothing was hard work about that album, it was a bit of a dream that sort of fell out of the sky... It was almost effortless to make in that they were so good at the time, and so happy at the time with the success that they got, there was no effort in it."

The LP album was recorded in three separate sessions: four days in December 1979 just before Christmas which produced the songs "King" and "Food for Thought" for the debut single, and two longer sessions in March–April 1980 and June–July 1980 when the bulk of the album was recorded. The three tracks for the 12" record that came with the album were recorded during 18–20 July 1980 at The Music Centre with Ray "Pablo" Falconer, bassist Earl Falconer's brother, handling production duties. Falconer would go on to produce the majority of UB40's subsequent records until his death in a car crash in 1987.

== Musical style and composition ==
"Food for Thought"
Food for Thought audio sample

Signing Off featured a mix of reggae and dub material which was lyrically politically charged and socially conscious, while musically it was reverb-heavy, doom-laden yet mellifluous, best exemplified in the hits "King" and "Food For Thought" as well as the searing "Burden of Shame". Four of the album's thirteen tracks were instrumentals—"Adella", "25%" (allegedly titled after the increase in wages demanded by the unions in the late 1970s to reflect a "living wage"), "Signing Off" and "Reefer Madness"—all heavily influenced by dub reggae rhythms and effects such as reverb and echo, and led by Mickey Virtue's keyboard and Travers' saxophone melodies. Two tracks were cover versions: an early Randy Newman composition "I Think It's Going to Rain Today" and the blues classic "Strange Fruit" (made famous by Billie Holiday), two songs that dealt with compassion for fellow humans and racism respectively. The main theme in "Burden of Shame" is copied from Van Morrison's "Moondance". This track and the remaining five self-composed tracks were all concerned with social and political issues:

- "Tyler" was written about the young black American Gary Tyler, who at the age of 17 was convicted by an all-white judge and jury of murdering a 13-year-old white boy, despite serious irregularities in the prosecution case and the lack of a murder weapon ever being found. UB40 intended "Tyler" to be their first single in the United States. The band revisited the subject on the song "Rainbow Nation" on their 2008 album TwentyFourSeven.
- "King" was about the late Martin Luther King Jr., questioning the lost direction of the slain leader's followers and the state of mourning of a nation after his death.
- "Burden of Shame" recounted the misdeeds performed in the name of British Imperialism.
- "Food for Thought" was an attempt to publicise and condemn the famine in north Africa, comparing it with the Western over-indulgent celebration of Christmas, nearly five years before Band Aid brought the subject to widespread attention. Subsequently, it was also a prominent feature of UB40's 2005 Live 8 appearance in Hyde Park, London, 25 years after the song had been first released. Bob Lamb later revealed that the song's original working title had been "The Christmas Song" until one of the band's roadies suggested "Food for Thought" would be a better title.
- "Little by Little" highlighted the growing inequality between the rich and the poor.
- "Madam Medusa" was a vivid description of Margaret Thatcher's rise to power depicted in a grotesque style, featuring some of the band's most impassioned and bitter lyrics.

== Release and promotion ==
The album's release was preceded by two double A-sided singles. The first, "King"/"Food For Thought", was released as UB40's debut single in February 1980. It topped the independent music chart for three months, reached number 4 in the main UK singles chart, and went on to sell nearly half a million copies, having been certified silver for sales of 250,000 copies in May 1980. It was the first single on a completely independent label without the backing of a major record company to reach the top 10 of the UK singles chart. Upon the single's release "Food for Thought" gained more radio airplay than "King" – speaking about the single in 2010, Bob Lamb said, "'Food for Thought' was actually the B-side of 'King' originally: although it was a double A-side 'King' was always going to be the main song, but the DJs picked up on 'Food for Thought' because it was quicker and chirpier, more dancey, more of a radio track. So they played that a lot, and really that became the hit, 'Food for Thought', but whenever you bought the record it always said 'King'/'Food for Thought' – 'King' was always, like, the first name on the record, which I thought was pretty cool."

The follow-up single "My Way of Thinking"/"I Think It's Going to Rain Today" peaked at number 6 on the UK charts in June 1980. Although this was the band's second single before the album was released, "My Way of Thinking" was not included on the album, despite gaining far more radio airplay and television exposure than "I Think It's Going to Rain Today": however, by the time of the album's release the group had come to dislike "My Way of Thinking", with singer Ali Campbell describing the song as "awful".

The original 1980 vinyl release of Signing Off consisted of a ten-track LP (played at the standard 33 rpm) plus a three-track 12" record (played at 45 rpm) which contained the tracks "Madam Medusa", "Strange Fruit" and "Reefer Madness". On the cassette version all thirteen tracks were split over the two sides of the cassette. When the album was issued on CD for the first time in 1984, it contained all thirteen tracks of the LP and cassette versions.

In 1985 the album was repackaged as a double album under the title The UB40 File, with the addition of "My Way of Thinking", "The Earth Dies Screaming" and "Dream a Lie", thus collecting together on a single album all of UB40's output on Graduate Records, before the band's subsequent releases on their own DEP International label. The latter two songs were released as UB40's third single (another double A-side) two months after the release of Signing Off, and were written and recorded at the same time as the album. For a short time in 1981–82 in Australia, the original album was released with a bonus 45 rpm single containing these two tracks, packaged in an identical smaller version of the album cover. The UB40 File has subsequently also been released on CD.

In 2010, to celebrate the 30th anniversary of the album's release Virgin Records reissued the album as a three-disc (two CDs and a DVD) "Collector's Edition", with extensive liner notes by Birmingham-born journalist Peter Paphides. The bonus tracks on the second CD included the 12" versions of all four sides of UB40's second and third singles, and the two sessions the band recorded at the BBC's Maida Vale Studios for the John Peel and Kid Jensen shows on BBC Radio 1. The DVD contained the videos made for five of the six songs on their first three double A-side singles, the band's first ever appearance on the BBC television programme Top of the Pops performing "Food for Thought", and the concert recorded at Keele University for BBC2's television series Rock Goes to College. To tie in with the 30th anniversary reissue, the band announced a concert tour where they would perform a first set of the album in its entirety, followed by a second set of other hits.

== Artwork ==
The front and back covers of the album are a replica of the yellow British UB40 unemployment benefit attendance card from which the band took their name, emphatically stamped with the words SIGNING OFF in capital letters. It was a statement by the band of leaving behind the world of unemployment and of their arrival on the music scene. The artwork was created by brothers Geoffrey and David Tristram: Geoff went on to become an artist and novelist, while David became a comic playwright.

== Critical reception ==
Professional ratings
Review scores
Source	Rating
AllMusic	4/5 stars
Christgau's Record Guide	B+
Encyclopedia of Popular Music	5/5 stars
Mojo	4/5 stars
Q	4/5 stars
Record Collector	4/5 stars
Record Mirror	4/5 stars
Sounds	5/5 stars

The album was extremely well received and lauded by the UK music magazines at the time of its original release. Sounds awarded Signing Off five stars out of five, claiming that "it is an (almost) perfect album... It's rare to find a debut album so detailed, so excellently played and so packed with bite – I sometimes think it hasn't really happened since The Clash." NME described the album as "a courageous debut... Their radical sentiments and trenchant lyrics are given all the more force by the soft-fist of UB40's measured musical delivery... The music might be mellow, but the hard-backed sentiments are hardly those of the nice reggae band you may have pigeonholed the UBs as." Melody Maker said "The UBs, chirpy and still fully independent, have wrapped up their initial promise and persuasion and delivered a well-girthed winner of a debut album... Certainly the music of UB40 benefits far more in both quality and quantity from the exacting freedom of an LP than any of their close contemporaries... the band have broadened out the unique, shy commerciality of the two singles, "King" and "Food for Thought"... to an approach that sharpens the shape of their music and magnifies the message." Record Mirror called the band "important" and observed that "their subtle dance music is opening up a lot of ears to the pleasures of British reggae".

More recent critical reviews show the album remains highly regarded. AllMusic said "Their rhythms may have been reggae-based, their music Jamaican-inspired, but UB40 had such an original take on the genre that all comparisons were moot... Their music was... revolutionary, their sound unlike anything else on either island [referring to Great Britain and Jamaica]... It's hard to believe this is the same UB40 that later topped the U.K. charts with the likes of 'Red Red Wine' and 'I Got You Babe'. Their fire was dampened quickly, but on Signing Off it blazed high, still accessible to the pop market, but so edgy that even those who are sure there's nothing about the group to admire will change their tune instantly." In 2008 Mojo magazine's online website revisited the album as part of their "Disc of the Day" series, calling it "the Brum reggae institution's original and best" and going on to say that "Signing Off was a singular British take on Jamaican music, in some ways truer to the reggae source than 2-Tone but with a punky, multi-cultured sensibility of its own... it's a superb balance of lightness and weight, as spry, skanking tunes rub up against militant lyrics made soulful by vocalist Ali Campbell." The print edition of the magazine also reviewed the 2010 reissue, stating that "Signing Off... has retained much of its fire... this is flinty, political and Britain-focused reggae, distinct from the later output of a band that... still acts as the form's global ambassadors." Reviewing the 2010 Collector's Edition, BBC Music said "Signing Off is still believed by many to be the group's greatest album, and it remains the clearest window into what the band were all about... [it] has energy and intelligence that made it stand out from so much post-punk pop. This set sums up a bunch of young Brummies schooled in the West Indian blues dances of Balsall Heath, angry about the world around them and articulate enough to express that without simply ranting."

=== Accolades ===
Signing Off was placed at number 13 in the NME critics' list of the albums of the year for 1982, while the singles "King"/"Food for Thought" and "My Way of Thinking" were at numbers 14 and 18 respectively in the equivalent singles of the year list. Sounds placed "King"/"Food for Thought" at number 8 in its end of year rankings for singles of the year, while Melody Maker ranked the same single at number 22 in its own list.

In June 2000 the British monthly music magazine Q placed Signing Off at number 83 in its critics' list of the "100 Greatest British Albums Ever". The album is also included in the book 1001 Albums You Must Hear Before You Die, the only UB40 album to feature.

== Track listing ==
All tracks written by UB40 except where noted. On some versions of the album, such as the US CD release, "Burden of Shame" is credited to UB40 and Van Morrison after the similarities to Morrison's own song "Moondance" had been noted, but on both the original 1980 release and the 2010 reissue the song is credited solely to UB40.

=== LP ===
==== Side one ====
1. "Tyler" – 5:51
2. "King" – 4:35
3. "12 Bar" – 4:24
4. "Burden of Shame" – 6:29

==== Side two ====
1. "Adella" – 3:28
2. "I Think It's Going to Rain Today" (Randy Newman) – 3:41
3. "25%" – 3:31
4. "Food for Thought" – 4:10
5. "Little by Little" – 3:44
6. "Signing Off" – 4:24

==== 12" EP side one ====
1. "Madam Medusa" – 12:52

==== 12" EP side two ====
1. "Strange Fruit" (Lewis Allan) – 4:05
2. "Reefer Madness" – 5:08

=== Cassette ===
==== Side one ====
1. "Tyler" – 5:51
2. "King" – 4:35
3. "12 Bar" – 4:24
4. "Burden of Shame" – 6:29
5. "Adella" – 3:28
6. "I Think It's Going to Rain Today" (Randy Newman) – 3:41
7. "25%" – 3:31

==== Side two ====
1. "Food for Thought" – 4:10
2. "Little by Little" – 3:44
3. "Signing Off" – 4:24
4. "Madam Medusa" – 12:52
5. "Strange Fruit" (Lewis Allan) – 4:05
6. "Reefer Madness" – 5:08

=== CD ===
1. "Tyler" – 5:51
2. "King" – 4:35
3. "12 Bar" – 4:24
4. "Burden of Shame" – 6:29
5. "Adella" – 3:28
6. "I Think It's Going to Rain Today" (Randy Newman) – 3:41
7. "25%" – 3:31
8. "Food for Thought" – 4:10
9. "Little by Little" – 3:44
10. "Signing Off" – 4:25
11. "Madam Medusa" – 12:53
12. "Strange Fruit" (Lewis Allan) – 4:05
13. "Reefer Madness" – 5:08

=== 30th Anniversary Collector's Edition ===
==== CD1 ====
1. "Tyler" – 5:51
2. "King" – 4:35
3. "12 Bar" – 4:24
4. "Burden of Shame" – 6:29
5. "Adella" – 3:28
6. "I Think It's Going to Rain Today" (Randy Newman) – 3:41
7. "25%" – 3:31
8. "Food for Thought" – 4:10
9. "Little by Little" – 3:44
10. "Signing Off" – 4:25

==== CD2 ====
1. "Madam Medusa" – 12:53
2. "Strange Fruit" (Lewis Allan) – 4:05
3. "Reefer Madness" – 5:08
4. "My Way of Thinking" (12" Version) – 6:50
5. "I Think It's Going to Rain Today" (12" Version) (Randy Newman) – 7:32
6. "The Earth Dies Screaming" (12" Version) – 8:21
7. "Dream a Lie" (12" Version) – 7:54

BBC Radio One John Peel Session 12/12/79 (first transmitted 02/01/80):

8. "Food for Thought" – 4:49
9. "25%" – 4:05
10. "King" – 5:38

BBC Radio One Kid Jensen Session 11/02/80:

11. "I Think It's Going to Rain Today" (Randy Newman) – 4:42
12. "My Way of Thinking" – 2:54

==== DVD ====
Promo Videos:

1. "Food for Thought"
2. "My Way of Thinking"
3. "The Earth Dies Screaming"
4. "Dream a Lie"
5. "I Think It's Going to Rain Today"

Top of the Pops 20/03/80:

6. "Food for Thought"

Rock Goes to College 19/01/81 (recorded at Keele University):

7. "King"
8. "Strange Fruit"
9. "The Earth Dies Screaming"
10. "Little by Little"
11. "I Think It's Going to Rain Today"
12. "Food for Thought"
13. "Tyler"
14. "Signing Off"

(total running time of DVD = 57:45)

== Personnel ==
UB40

- Astro – talk-over vocal
- Jim Brown – drums
- Ali Campbell – lead vocals, rhythm guitar
- Robin Campbell – lead guitar, vocals
- Earl Falconer – bass
- Norman Lamont Hassan (misspelt as "Norman Lamount Hassan" on the credits of the original 1980 release) – percussion, congas
- Brian Travers – tenor saxophone, melodica
- Michael Virtue – keyboards, strings, organ

Production

- UB40 – producers, all tracks
- Bob Lamb – producer and engineer on LP/tracks 1 to 10 on cassette & CD versions
- Ray "Pablo" Falconer – producer on "Madam Medusa", "Strange Fruit" and "Reefer Madness"
- Rafe McKenna – engineer on "Madam Medusa", "Strange Fruit" and "Reefer Madness"
- Neil Black – assistant engineer on "Madam Medusa", "Strange Fruit" and "Reefer Madness"

== Charts ==
Chart (1980–81)	Peak position
Australian Albums (Kent Music Report)	26
New Zealand Albums (RMNZ)	4
UK Albums (Official Charts)	2
UK Independent Albums (Record Business)	1

== Certifications ==
Region	Certification	Certified units/sales
New Zealand (RMNZ)	Gold	7,500^{^}
United Kingdom (BPI)	Platinum	300,000^{^}
^{^} Shipments figures based on certification alone.

== Release history ==
Region	Date	Label	Format	Catalog
United Kingdom	29 August 1980	Graduate Records	LP + 12" vinyl	GRADLP 2
United Kingdom	29 August 1980	Graduate Records	cassette	GRADMC 2
United Kingdom	1984	Graduate Records	CD	GRADCD 2
United States	8 February 1994	Virgin Records America	CD	0777 7 88261 2 5
United Kingdom & Europe	1 November 2010	Virgin Records	double CD + DVD	5099990687020
