= UB40 Live =

Live album by UB40
- Released: 14 February 1983
- Recorded: Ireland, February 1982
- Genre: Reggae
- Length: 51:53
- Label: DEP International
- Producer: UB40 and Pablo Falconer

UB40 Live is a 1983 album (cat no. LPDEP 4) of live concert recordings of UB40 performing songs from their first three studio albums.

== Track listing ==
All songs are written by UB40.

1. "Food for Thought"
2. "Sardonicus"
3. "Don't Slow Down"
4. "Folitician"
5. "Tyler"
6. "Present Arms"
7. "The Piper Calls the Tune"
8. "Love Is All Is Alright"
9. "Burden of Shame"
10. "One in Ten"

== Certifications ==
Region	Certification	Certified units/sales
Netherlands (NVPI)	Gold	50,000^{^}
^{^} Shipments figures based on certification alone.
