= The Chosen Few (reggae group) =

Jamaican reggae group

The Chosen Few are a reggae group from Kingston, Jamaica, formed in 1969 and were popular until the early 1990s.

== History ==
The Chosen Few evolved from the Federals, with the latter's Franklin Spence and David Scott joined by Noel Bunny Brown and Richard McDonald. They initially recorded reggae covers of songs by artists such as Blue Mink and The Delfonics for producer Derrick Harriott. Scott left the group to embark on a solo career as a deejay, to be replaced by Busty Brown, formerly of the Messengers. The line-up changed again, with McDonald being replaced by Errol Brown, the group working with producer Lloyd Charmers and enjoying hits with versions of the Stylistics' "People Make the World Go Round" among others, followed in 1973 by the album Hit After Hit. This was followed in 1975 by Everybody Plays the Fool and in 1976 by the Miami-recorded Night and Day album (aka The Chosen Few in Miami), mixing reggae on one side with soul on the other, and featuring guest performances from members of KC and the Sunshine Band. Their success in the 1970s saw them touring the United States, Canada, and England.

The group continued in the 1980s, with Franklin Spence (A J Franklin) and Errol Brown joined by Michael Deslandes (Momo-Watt). The Chosen Few in 2024 regrouped and now backed to four members with new member Sly Augustus. The group is once again recording with Kufe Records.

== Albums ==
- Hit After Hit (Trojan, 1973)
- Everybody Plays the Fool (Trojan, 1975)
- The Chosen Few (Konduko/ Micron Music Limited, 1975)/ In Miami (Trojan, 1976)
