= Bunny Brown =

Jamaican reggae artist (died 2019)

Noel 'Bunny' Brown (died 4 February 2019) was a Jamaican reggae artist, known for songs such as "Ready for the World", "Memories Don't Live like People Do", and "Rock You Baby". As a member of the group The Chosen Few with members including Franklin Spence, David Scott and Richard McDonald, they performed reggae versions of American R&B.

Bunny Brown died on 4 February 2019, aged in his 60s, from bone cancer.

== Discography ==
=== Studio albums ===
- Ready for the World (unknown)
- Fat Boy (1972)
