= Tommy Cowan =

Music producer and singer (born 1946)

- Born: Thomas Lincoln Cowan; 6 April 1946 (age 80); Saint Elizabeth, Jamaica
- Genres: Reggae; ska; rocksteady; gospel
- Occupations: Singer-songwriter; musician; record producer
- Instrument: Vocals
- Years active: mid-1960s–present
- Labels: Talent Corporation; MIC; Glory Music

Tommy Cowan CD (born Thomas Lincoln Cowan, 6 April 1946) is a producer and singer, initially working in reggae but later concentrating on gospel, who has been involved in the music business since the 1960s. He is also an ordained gospel minister and a Justice of the Peace.

== Biography ==
Cowan was born, Saint Elizabeth, Jamaica. He entered the music business in the mid-1960s as a member of The Merricoles, a vocal group who won a local talent contest. The group changed their name to The Jamaicans in 1967, and won the Jamaican Song Festival with the Duke Reid-produced "Baba Boom", which also topped the Jamaican chart. More hits followed in the form of "Sing Freedom", "Things You Say You Love", and "Woman Go Home", before the group split up.

Cowan then took up a job as Sales & Marketing Manager at Byron Lee's Dynamic Studios, which gave him the experience needed to move into record production, working with artists including Jacob Miller and Inner Circle, Earl Zero, Ray I, Leroy Smart, Ras Michael, The Cimarons, Dean Stone, and Junior Tucker. An album of dubs of Cowan's productions from this era, Ras Claat Dub was issued on the Grounation label. Several other Cowan-produced sets were credited to the Fatman Ridim Section. Cowan also produced Israel Vibration's The Same Song and Why Worry albums and the latter's associated dub set, Israel Tafari, mixed by King Tubby. Cowan became Inner Circle's manager and set up the Top Ranking record label. Cowan also worked as a Master of Ceremonies at Reggae Sunsplash festivals and at the One Love Peace Concert, organised by Bob Marley. Cowan helped Marley to set up his Tuff Gong studio, and Marley invited Cowan to accompany him on his tour of Europe, and then Zimbabwe in 1980, where he compered the Zimbabwe Independence Day Concert in Salisbury. Back in Jamaica, Cowan with then wife Valerie Chang-Cowan built up his Talent Corporation company, which he had founded in 1975, with artists such as John Holt, Dobby Dobson, Ruddy Thomas, Toots Hibbert, Ernie Smith, Scotty, Jack Radics, and Cowan's second wife Carlene Davis. In 1982, he released an album, The King's Music, credited to Tommy Cowan & Thunder, and featuring musicians such as Willie Lindo, Robbie Lyn, Lloyd Parks, Bongo Herman, and Dean Fraser, with backing vocals from his wife Carlene Davis, and Beres Hammond.

Previously a Rastafarian, Cowan converted to Christianity in 1996. In 1998 Tommy, together with his wife Carlene, began Vessel Ministries and today they both operate the Judah Recording Studio and the Glory Music record label, concentrating on gospel music. Cowan is also the producer of Jamaica's largest Christian music festival, Fun in the Son. This event was awarded "Gospel Event of the Year in 2014 by the Love Gospel International Awards, Bronx, New York /Kingston, Jamaica.

In 2006, Pressure Sounds issued a compilation of Cowan's productions, Life Goes in Circles (Sounds From The Talent Corporation 1974 to 1979).

In June 2013, Cowan was sworn in as a Justice of the Peace. His daughter is Naomi Cowan, a reggae musician who won the Juno Award for Reggae Recording of the Year in 2026.

== Awards ==
Cowan has received various musical accolades from organisations such as the Jamaica Federation of Musicians, Rockers Awards, the JAMI Awards, and Martin's International Reggae & World Music Awards. He received the Rocksteady Union Lifetime Achievement Award for his contribution to Jamaican music, and both the Mega Jamz Award and Maja awards for Gospel Promoter of the Year in 2007. He and his wife, Carlene Davis was officially inducted into the Gospel Hall Of Fame in 2015 by The Jamaica GHF president and Founder Bishop Dr. J.O Baker in Kingston, Jamaica.

He was also awarded an Honorary Doctorate of Divinity from the Trinity Theological Seminary of South Florida for his work in the gospel, and he is also ordained as a gospel minister.

In October 2007, Cowan was awarded the Order of Distinction (Commander Class) by the Jamaican Government.

== Albums ==
- The King's Music (1982) MIC (Tommy Cowan & Thunder)
