= Herman Sang =

- Also known as: Hersang
- Genres: Reggae, Ska
- Occupations: Musician, shift supervisor
- Instrument: Piano
- Works: 1950s - 1960s, 2000s
- Labels: All Stars, Blue Beat
- Member of: Alley Cats, Hersang & His Combo, Hersang and His City Slickers, The City Slickers, The Jiving Juniors
- Spouse: Bernice

Herman Sang is a pianist from Bournemouth Gardens, Jamaica. He played an integral part in the pre-ska and early-ska development of Jamaican music.

== Background ==
Sang was a member of the Jiving Juniors. He was also in Alley Cats, The City Slickers, Hersan and the City Slickers, and Hersang and His Combo. His young brother Claude Sang Jr. was a member of the Zodiacs and had also recorded for the Sugar record label.

== Career ==
=== 1950s to 1960s ===
Herman Sang was the musical arranger at Tip Top Studios. he played on many of Roy Panton and Yvonne Harrison's recordings.

Sang formed the Jiving Juniors in 1958 with Eugene Dwyer, Derrick Harriott, and Maurice Wynter. Singer Jimmy James recalled that he went to see producer Lyndon Pottinger around that time. Jiving Juniors member, Herman Sang was doing the auditions. James said to Sang "I don't think sey me is any singer, I just write the song for somebody to sing it". Sang told him to come into the studio and sing it, and whoever is going to sing it will hear what he did and pick up on it. The next thing James knew it was playing on the radio.

In September 1962 Owen Gray had his song "Best Twist" released on Blue Beat BB 113. The B side "Grandma-Grandpa" was by Owen Gray, Hersang and the City Slickers.

In 1963, Sang stepped back from music and took up a position at the Standard Oil refinery in the West Indies as a shift supervisor.

=== 2000s ===
In 2002, Sang played at the "Legends of Ska" in Toronto, Canada. It was recorded by filmmaker Brad Klein and became part of the Legends of Ska film.

== Personal life ==
Sang is married to Bernice and lives in Canada now. He is a father to two children and grandfather.
