= King (UB40 song) =

1980 single by UB40

Single by UB40

from the album Signing Off
- A-side: "Food for Thought"
- Released: 1 February 1980
- Recorded: 21–24 December 1979
- Studio: Bob Lamb's "Home of the Hits", Moseley, Birmingham
- Genre: Reggae; pop
- Length: 4:31
- Label: Graduate
- Songwriter: UB40
- Producers: Bob Lamb; UB40

UB40 singles chronology
| "King" / "Food for Thought" (1980) | "My Way of Thinking" / "I Think It's Going to Rain Today" (1980) |

"King" is a song by British reggae band UB40, released as their debut single in February 1980 from their album Signing Off. It peaked at number 4 on the UK Singles Chart as a double A-side single with "Food for Thought".

== Background and release ==
"King" is about Martin Luther King Jr., questioning the lost direction of the deceased leader's followers and the state of mourning of a nation after his death. It was written by the group after having watched a documentary on King. It was the first song UB40 played to producer Bob Lamb, with Lamb recalling that "it just blew my mind basically, to realise a bunch of kids could make a sound like that... it blew me away. And that was it for me, I was hooked, it was a bit like Elvis walks in or something, you know, it was one of those moments". The band were unable to afford to record in a studio, so they used Lamb's bedsit in Moseley to record the entire Signing Off album.

"King" was released as the main A-side with "Food for Thought" as the AA-side. It was therefore intended to be the side promoted; however, radio disc jockeys saw "Food for Thought" as the better radio track and as such it gained more airplay than "King" and became the hit. The song was positively received, with Simon Ludgate for Record Mirror describing "King" as "superb, spacy reggae. Best crossover reggae / pop I've come across in months. It has a soothing, cool effect that is very therapeutic".

== Charts ==
| Chart (1980) | Peak position |
|---|---|
| Australia (Kent Music Report) | 36 |
| Ireland (IRMA) | 10 |
| UK Singles (OCC) | 4 |
| UK Independent Singles (Record Business) | 1 |
