= I Think It's Going to Rain Today =

1968 song by Randy Newman

Single by Randy Newman

from the album Randy Newman
- A-side: "The Beehive State"
- Released: 1968
- Length: 2:55
- Label: Reprise
- Songwriter: Randy Newman
- Producers: Lenny Waronker; Van Dyke Parks

Randy Newman singles chronology
"Last Night I Had A Dream / I Think He's Hiding" (1968)	"I Think It's Going to Rain Today" (1968)	"Love Story" (1968)

"I Think It's Going to Rain Today" (or "I Think It's Gonna Rain Today") is a song by American singer-songwriter Randy Newman. It appears on Judy Collins' 1966 album In My Life, Julius La Rosa's 1966 album You're Gonna Hear from Me, Eric Burdon's 1967 album Eric Is Here, Dusty Springfield's 1968 album Dusty... Definitely, on Newman's 1968 debut album Randy Newman, in The Randy Newman Songbook Vol. 1 (2003) and in Newman's official and bootleg live albums. It is one of his most covered songs, and cover versions charted in the UK for UB40 and in Canada for Tom Northcott.

== Background ==
Newman told Rolling Stone that he wrote the song around 1963 or 1964. He went on to say that the "music is emotional – even beautiful – and the lyrics are not." Newman also said that the song bothered him due to the darkness and that the song felt "sophomoric" and "too maudlin".

Newman stated in 2017 that he had signed away the publishing rights on his first album and as a result, does not see any money from people doing covers of those songs.

== Tom Northcott version ==
"I Think It's Going to Rain Today"

Single by Tom Northcott

from the album Upside Downside
- B-side: "It's True"
- Released: 1971
- Length: 2:37
- Label: UNI
- Songwriter: Randy Newman
- Producers: Barry DeVorzon; Tom Northcott

Tom Northcott singles chronology
"Crazy Jane" (1970)	"I Think It's Going to Rain Today" (1971)	"Spaceship Races" (1971)

The song was covered by Canadian folk-rock artist Tom Northcott in 1970. It was released in 1971 as the second single from his debut album, Upside Downside. The song reached number 46 in Canada and number 17 on the Canadian Adult Contemporary chart.

Northcott's "I think It's Going to Rain Today" came first in the Maple Leaf System competition at 6.3, with the results published in Billboard, January 2, 1971. As reported in the Jan, 23 edition of RPM Weekly, RCA had faith in the single's potential and their promotion team were taking advantage of the current chart action with the intention of bolstering it. The team that was pushing it consisted of Ed Preston, Scott Richards and Johnny Murphy.

=== Charts ===
Chart (1971)	Peak position
Canada Adult Contemporary (RPM)	17
Canada Top Singles (RPM)	46

== UB40 version ==
"I Think It's Going to Rain Today"

Single by UB40

from the album Signing Off
- A-side: "My Way of Thinking"
- Released: 6 June 1980
- Genre: Reggae; pop
- Length: 3:41
- Label: Graduate
- Songwriter: Randy Newman
- Producers: Bob Lamb; UB40

UB40 singles chronology
"King" / "Food for Thought" (1980)	"My Way of Thinking" / "I Think It's Going to Rain Today" (1980)	"The Earth Dies Screaming" / "Dream a Lie" (1980)

The song was covered by British reggae band UB40 in 1980. It was released in June 1980 as the second and final single from their debut album, Signing Off. The song reached number 6 in the UK. The UB40 single was a double A-side with "My Way of Thinking", which was the first-named track and received most of the radio airplay. However, the German single (which appeared later) had "I Think It's Going to Rain Today" as the A-side. The group covered the song for bandmembers Robin and Ali Campbell's father, folksinger Ian Campbell, who was a fan of Newman and who had recorded his own version of the song in the 1960s.

=== Charts ===
Chart (1980–1981)	Peak position
Australia (Kent Music Report)	90
Ireland (IRMA)	12
New Zealand (Recorded Music NZ)	6

== Other cover versions ==
The song was covered numerous times by a variety of artists, especially during the late 1960s and early 1970s.

Artist	Album	Year
Judy Collins	In My Life	1966
Bobby Darin	Inside Out	1967
Dusty Springfield	Dusty... Definitely	1968 (UK)
Claudine Longet	Colours	1968 (US)
Rick Nelson	Perspective	1969
Peggy Lee	A Natural Woman	1969
Nina Simone	Nina Simone and Piano	1969
Leonard Nimoy	The Touch of Leonard Nimoy	1969
Rick McClellan	Frozen Sunshine	1969
Neil Diamond	Stones	1971
Françoise Hardy	If You Listen	1971
Dave Van Ronk	Van Ronk	1971
Barbra Streisand	Release Me (2012 release of 'Stoney End' session; Newman on piano)	1971
Brian Short	Anything for a Laugh	1971
Cass Elliot	Cass Elliot	1972
Bobby Doyle	Nine Songs	1973
Melanie	Madrugada	1974
Joe Cocker	Jamaica Say You Will	1975
Cleo Laine	Born on a Friday	1976
Tony Rice	Cold on the Shoulder	1984
Katie Melua	Call Off the Search	2003
Norah Jones	Higher Ground	2005
Curtis Stigers	I Think It's Going to Rain Today	2005
Audra McDonald	Build a Bridge	2006
Madeleine Peyroux	Half The Perfect World	2006
Peter Gabriel	Scratch My Back	2010
Paul Carrack	A Different Hat (with Royal Philharmonic Orchestra)	2010
Tom Odell	Long Way Down	2013
Blackmore's Night	Dancer and the Moon	2013

== In popular culture ==
Bette Midler included the song in her film Beaches (1988) and it appears in the soundtrack recording. A portion of Claudine Longet's version of the song is played in the Episode 22, Season Five of the Gilmore Girls, "A House is Not a Home." The song is also featured in the TV series Designated Survivor in the episode, "Two Ships". Nina Simone's version of the song's first verse was the opening theme for the BBC One series Broken. Simone's version also appears in the "Spies Like Us" episode from season two and “The Decision” from season six of the TV series Scandal. A short excerpt of the song is played in the final episode of the Childhood's End miniseries. The song is also played in the movie "Mr. Monk's Last Case: The Monk Movie" released in 2023 sung by Randy Newman. The version performed by Lauren O'Connell was played in Season 6, Episode 20 of The Good Wife.
