= Operation Rayon =

- Part of World War II
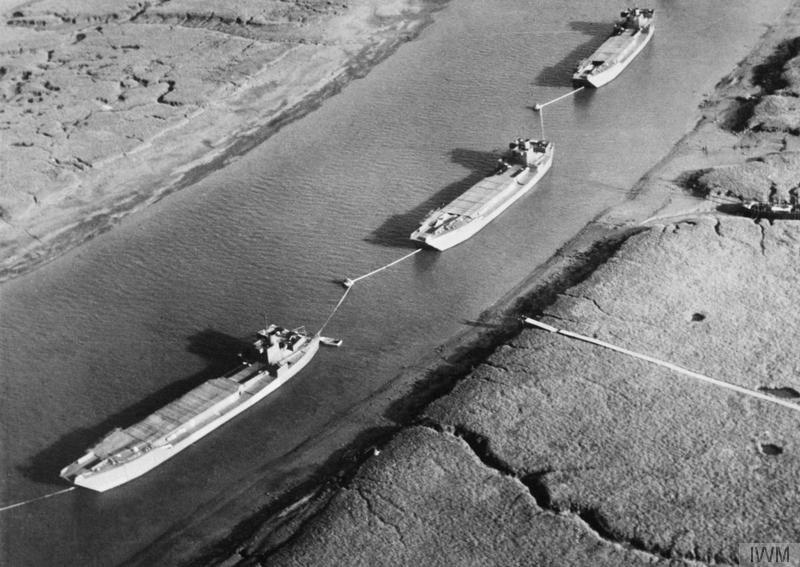
- "WETBOB" dummy landing craft such as those deployed during Operation Rayon
- Operational scope: Strategic
- Type: Military deception
- Planned: 1942
- Planned by: Advanced Headquarters 'A' Force
- Objective: Force Germany to reinforce Crete
- Outcome: Success in keeping a large German garrison in Greece and on Crete

Operation Rayon was an Allied deception operation in the Mediterranean Theatre during World War II. The operation called for Allied forces to mislead the Wehrmacht into believing that the Allies were going to attack the island of Crete. Operation Rayon was successful in its aims and forced the Germans to divert forces from other fronts to defend Crete and Occupied Greece. The operation was planned and implemented by Advanced Headquarters 'A' Force.

== Background ==
The Battle of Greece and the subsequent Fall of Crete resulted in the Allies being driven from Greece by a combined German and Italian force. Greece was brought under German occupation, with the industry and infrastructure of the country being used to support the German North African Campaign. The loss of Crete was a major defeat for the British Empire, which had used the island to support naval activity and to base aircraft. Considerations were made for an actual invasion to recapture the island, but these plans were abandoned as being too risky, and the British efforts to fight in North Africa were already taxing resources. As such, the Allies focused instead on disrupting lines of supply between the Italian colony of Libya and the European mainland to hinder the Axis armies in North Africa. On the opposing side, the Germans knew that Crete was of vital importance to the control of the Aegean Sea, and as such made efforts to defend the island from an Allied counterattack.

In December 1941 Britain declared war on the Empire of Japan, leading to the opening of the Pacific War. As Australia and New Zealand were now threatened by the Japanese advance, many commonwealth soldiers were redeployed from North Africa to the Pacific. To cover the movement of these troops, the British conducted maneuvers designed to make the Germans think that an attack in Greece was underway. Communications were also leaked to Axis intelligence agencies to support this deception. British intelligence reports indicated an increase in German and Italian activity in Greece during the redeployment, with this reaction being the direct inspiration for what would become Operation Rayon.

== Operation ==
In mid July 1942 Operation Rayon was implemented. Rayon was intended to draw Axis attention away from Allied convoys travelling to Malta and to divert forces from North Africa. The "Story" that was promoted to the Germans was that the Allies were preparing to launch an air and seaborne assault on the Island of Crete using British and Greek troops supported by American air power. False intelligence was planted with the intent to mislead the Germans. Rumors were spread by British intelligence among the Greek exile communities in the Middle East, hinting that the liberation of the Greek mainland was imminent. Greek soldiers and a Greek destroyer undertook actual assault drills in preparation for an invasion. Dummy landing craft and gliders were constructed and placed in areas that were known to be within the range of German reconnaissance planes. American aircrews deployed in Cyprus were put through drills.

The result of these activities was mixed. A moderate increase in German activity on Crete was detected, and the operation succeeded in drawing attention away from a convoy bound for Malta.

== Aftermath ==
Many of the 'A' force personnel involved in Operation Rayon were employed in Operation Zeppelin, another operation intended to mislead the Wehrmacht into believing an Allied invasion of Greece would occur.

Dummy landing craft (dubbed "Drybob" and "Wetbob") used in Operation Rayon were later used in Operation Bodyguard.
