= Roy Rayon =

Jamaican singer

- Born: 20 June 1959 (age 66); Westmoreland, Jamaica
- Genres: Reggae

Roy Rayon (born 20 June 1959) is a Jamaican singer who has won the Jamaica Independence Festival Popular Song Competition four times.

== Biography ==
Born in Westmoreland, Rayon moved to Kingston at the age of 16, and studied at the Jamaica School of Drama. He was a member of the Unique Vision band from 1981 to 1986, also managing the band, and also toured with the Fabulous Five Inc. band.

He is best known for his success in the Festival song contest, which he has entered many times since his first entry in 1983 (with "Festival Train"), first winning in 1985 with "Love Fever", written by Asley "Grub" Cooper. He won again in 1987 with another Cooper composition, "Give Thanks and Praises", celebrating 25 years of Jamaican independence, and for a third time in 1991 with "Come Rock". He won for the fourth time in 2008 with "Rise and Shine", winning the $1,000,000 first prize. Rayon's success in the Popular Song Competition has led to him being dubbed 'Mr. Festival'.

Rayon has also acted as a judge on the Digicel Rising Stars talent show.

In 2012 he released an album compiling his Competition entries.

== Discography ==
- Trash and ready (1985)
- Country Boy Gone International (2003), Country Boy
- Rise Up Mighty People (2012)
