= Scotty (reggae vocalist) =

Jamaican vocalist and deejay (1951–2003)

- Born: David Scott; 1951
- Origin: Westmoreland, Jamaica
- Died: 27 February 2003 (aged 51)
- Genres: Reggae
- Instrument: Vocals

Scotty (born, David Scott; 1951, in Westmoreland, Jamaica – 27 February 2003, in Kingston, Jamaica) was a Jamaican reggae vocalist and deejay.

== Biography ==
While studying at Kingston Technical High School, Scotty and fellow students Valman Smykle and A. J. Franklin (born Franklin Spence) formed a reggae trio called The Federals. They began performing paid concerts in 1967, and shortly thereafter they attracted the attention of reggae producer and music promoter Derrick Harriott while performing at a Kingston venue called the Sombrero Club. Harriott added them to a tour of reggae artists, Derrick Harriott's Musical Chariot, and helped them record a series of singles. Their first single, "Penny For Your Song", was a local hit, but subsequent singles failed to chart, and in 1969 Smykle quit the group and moved to New York City. After the break-up of The Federals, Scotty and Franklin re-formed their group by adding two new members, Noel "Bunny" Brown and Richard MacDonald. They adopted the name The Chosen Few, and resumed work under Harriott. Their popularity increased in 1970 after they provided back-up vocals for Hopeton Lewis's single "Boom Shacka Lacka", and later that year they scored a Jamaican No. 1 hit of their own with "Psychedelic Train".

Shortly after this success, Harriott removed Scotty from The Chosen Few, replacing him with Busty Brown, the former singer for The Messengers. Instead, Scotty provided DJ work for various groups under Harriott's auspices, such as The Crystallites, his first DJ outing being "Musical Chariot". He appeared on numerous charting hits during this period, such as "Sesame Street" (1970, reaching No. 3 in Jamaica), "Riddle I This" (1970, No. 1) and "Jam Rock Style" (1971). His song "Draw Your Brakes", a deejay or toasting version of Keith & Tex's hit "Stop That Train", was in the soundtrack to the film, The Harder They Come.

Scotty's style prefigured the 'singjay' style of the late 1970s. He continued working with Harriott until 1972, after which he spent a couple of years working with other producers such as Harry J, Lloyd Charmers, and Sonia Pottinger. Scotty moved to the United States in 1974, settling in Florida. He established a recording studio and a record label, but these both failed, and he returned to Jamaica. He resumed recording, now in a ragga style, and was working on a new album when he died, aged 51, of prostate cancer in 2003.

== Albums ==
- Schooldays (1971, Crystal)
- Draw Your Brakes (1972, Crystal)
- Unbelievable Sounds (1988, Trojan)
