= Tony Tribe =

Jamaican vocalist

Background information
- Born: Anthony Mossop; Jamaica
- Occupation: Musician
- Labels: Decca, Trojan, Marathon

Anthony Patrick Orlando Mossop (9 October 1943 – 1979), known professionally as Tony Tribe and Tony Kingston, was a Jamaican and British vocalist. After moving to Great Britain in 1956, he joined The Soul Seekers, a gospel outfit from Calvary Apostolic Church in Camberwell. He subsequently charted at No. 46 on the UK Singles Chart with a solo reggae version of Neil Diamond's "Red Red Wine", which became Trojan Records's first UK chart entry and inspired a UB40 cover version that charted at No. 1 on the UK Singles Chart and the Billboard Hot 100. He also performed at the 1969 Caribbean Reggae Festival. He then moved to Canada and released several singles there including "I Am the Preacher", which charted at No. 65 on the RPM charts, and then an album.

== Life and career ==
Anthony Patrick Orlando Mossop was born on 9 October 1943 in Kingston, Jamaica; his first performances were at that city's Ward Theatre aged nine. He moved to Great Britain, taking a full time job in the post room of the High Commission of Jamaica, London. In the mid-1960s, he joined the gospel outfit The Soul Seekers, from Calvary Apostolic Church in Camberwell, and released an EP with them on Herald Records. Steve Alexander Smith used his 2009 book British Black Gospel to note that "Mossop was a charismatic figure admired by hordes of female fans", and that a 1966 Gravesend show had "resulted in the group being mobbed by teenage girls, some of whom took their blouses off in order to throw them at Mossop". He left in August 1966 and released the single "Mama Come On Home" on Decca Records in April 1967 and "Master Hand" on Pye Records in October 1967; the former became popular on the Northern soul circuit.

Before UB40’s 1983 rendition brought the song mainstream fame, Tony Tribe introduced Neil Diamond’s “Red Red Wine” to the reggae world in 1969. Tribe’s rocksteady version transformed the track with a laid-back groove that gave it a distinctly reggae feel. His smooth, emotive vocals pair perfectly with the rhythm, bringing out the song’s themes of heartbreak and solace found in a glass of wine. Tribe’s version became a reggae classic, celebrated for its unique blend of melancholy and groove. Even today, his interpretation stands out as a quintessential example of reggae’s ability to reinvent and breathe new life into songs from other genres.

— Samuel Moore of Singersroom.com

In 1969, using the stage name Tony Tribe, Mossop released a reggae version of Neil Diamond's "Red Red Wine", a song that had previously been a hit for Jimmy James and the Vagabonds. The song's record label, Trojan Records, managed to misspell his stage name as "Tony Tripe". Produced by Dandy Livingstone and backed with the Rudies' "Blues", Mossop's version was performed by him on Top of the Pops and charted at No. 46 on the UK Singles Chart, becoming the then-fledgling Trojan Records' first UK chart hit. The song's success can be attributed to its popularity among British skinheads, though Ian McCann of the Financial Times suggested in 2017 that the song had made the charts in spite of its "jerky ska rhythm" being "anachronistic even then". In January 2025, Samuel Moore of Singersroom.com described Tribe's version as the third best reggae song of all time. Mossop later performed on Top of the Pops, before releasing a second single, a cover of "Gonna Give Her All the Love I've Got" under the name "I’m Gonna Give You All The Love I’ve Got".

On 21 September 1969, Mossop, Johnny Nash, Desmond Dekker, Max Romeo, the Rudies, Derrick Morgan, Jackie Edwards, Jimmy Cliff, Jimmy James, the Skatalites, the Mohawks, Root and Jenny Jackson, and Black Velvet performed at Wembley Arena for the first Caribbean Music Festival, the first major reggae event to be held in Britain. For this performance, he dressed in braces as a nod to the support he had received from skinheads. Charlie Gillett of Record Mirror wrote that Tribe's set had been "spoiled because of trouble with his group's amplification system", but that this did not "hide his beautiful soaring voice on "Speak Her Name" and his hit "Red Red Wine"". He also noted that the "thudding reggae beat which pounds through most discotheques and clubs was wisely restricted" during the festival, and this had enabled Mossop, Romeo, and Dekker "to prove themselves to be much better singers than their records suggest". Mossop later filmed for a Horace Ové documentary Reggae, which was released in 1971.

Multiple sources, including McCann (2017) and Tom Breihan of Stereogum (2021), claim that Mossop died in a car crash around the time of "Gonna...", with Smith (2009) further suggesting that it had happened in Canada in 1970 and had also killed members of Mossop's family. What actually happened is that Mossop instead emigrated to Canada in 1972, where he resumed his Tony Kingston alias. After signing to Yorkville Records, he released the double A-side single "What We Need/Faith, Hope, and Charity", which flopped. Its follow-up single, "I Am the Preacher", was a cover of Deep Purple's "Hallelujah" and charted at No. 65 on the RPM Top Singles chart and No. 15 on the CHUM Chart, following which Yorkville released a flipped version of their first single. Mossop then signed with Marathon Records, who released the album Tongue Tied in 1973, Chappell Publishing, under which he worked with Harry Hinde, and Sweet Plum Records, on which he released "What Did You Say", "Who's Gonna Sing My Rock and Roll Song", and "Too Heavy to Carry". Mossop's fatal car accident took place in 1979, following which he was interred at Pine Hills Cemetery in Toronto.

== Legacy ==
In 1983, UB40 covered Mossop's version of "Red Red Wine", under the impression that the "N Diamond" who wrote the track was a Jamaican artist called Negus Diamond, and having never heard Neil's version. Breihan (2021) described their take as "somewhere between the Tony Tribe version that the band members knew and the Neil Diamond original". The song later topped the UK Singles Chart, and appeared on Labour of Love, an album of cover versions; writing in their 2006 autobiography Blood and Fire, Ali and Robin Campbell noted that they had known "all of those tracks as smash hits in [Balsall Heath]" and were taken aback to discover that reggae was not as popular in their subsequent neighbourhood Kings Heath. They also noted that they had only found out that Neil Diamond owned the song's publishing rights when they cleared them for their version, and alleged that Mossop's version was "obviously a cover of the version by Jimmy James & the Vagabonds". UB40's version would top the Billboard Hot 100 five years later after J.J. Morgan played it on KKFR. Additionally, Elan Atias would cover the song in 2001.

== Discography ==
=== Studio albums ===
- Tongue Tied (1973)

=== Singles ===
- "Mama Come On Home"/"Agony And Ecstasy" (1967, as Tony Kingston)
- "Red Red Wine" (1969, as Tony Tribe, backed with the Rudies' "Blues")
- "I’m Gonna Give You All The Love I’ve Got" (1969, as Tony Tribe, backed with Herbie Grey's "Why Wait")
- "What We Need"/"Faith, Hope and Charity" (1972, as Tony Kingston)
- "I Am the Preacher"/"What We Need" (1972, as Tony Kingston)
- "Faith, Hope, and Charity"/"What We Need" (1972, as Tony Kingston)
- "What D'You Say"/"What D'You Say (instrumental)" (1973, as Tony Kingston)
- "Who’s Gonna Sing My Rock and Roll Song"/"Mysterious People" (1973, as Tony Kingston)
- "Too Heavy To Carry"/"Worst That Could Happen" (1974, as Tony Kingston)
- "Sweet Music" (1978, as Tony Kingston)
