= The Kingstonians =

Former rocksteady/reggae vocal group from Jamaica

- Origin: Kingston, Jamaica
- Genres: Rocksteady, reggae
- Years active: 1966–1970
- Past members: Cebert "Jackie" Bernard; Lloyd "Footy" Bernard; Lloyd Kerr

The Kingstonians were a Jamaican rocksteady/reggae vocal group best known for their late 1960s recordings for producer Derrick Harriott.

== History ==
Formed in 1966, the group comprised Cebert "Jackie" Bernard, his brother Lloyd "Footy" Bernard, and Lloyd Kerr. They first recorded for producer J.J. Johnson, and had their first hit with "Winey Winey" in 1967. Between 1968 and 1970 they recorded for producer Derrick Harriott, and had chart-topping singles with "Singer Man" (later covered by Three Dog Night and UB40) and "Sufferer". The group's only album released while they were together, Sufferer, was released in 1970 on Trojan Records, and featured material recorded for Harriott. They went on to record with other producers including Leslie Kong and Rupie Edwards before splitting up in the early 1970s.

The group's primary songwriter Jackie Bernard pursued a solo career, with several releases credited to Jackie Bernard & the Kingstonians. He recorded "Economic Crisis" for Lee "Scratch" Perry in the late 1970s under the pseudonym 'Jack Lord'.

Jackie Bernard fell on hard times and became ill with diabetes; Unable to afford medication, a foundation was set up in 2014 to provide him with financial assistance. He died from pneumonia on 14 September 2014, aged 66.

== Discography ==
=== Albums ===
- Sufferer (1970), Trojan – reissued 1991

=== Singles ===
- "Winey Winey" (1967), Rio
- "Mix It Up" (1968), Trojan
- "Mommy and Daddy" (1968), Doctor Bird
- "Fun Galore" (1968), Doctor Bird
- "Put Down Your Fire" (1968), Doctor Bird
- "Mother Miserable" (1968), Coxsone
- "Make You a Woman", Studio One
- "Nice Nice" (1969), Big Shot
- "Singer Man" (1969), Big Shot
- "The Clip" (1969), Crab
- "I am Just a Minstrel" (1969), Bullet
- "I'm Gonna Make It" (1969), Beverley's
- "Hold Down" (1969), Crab
- "Rumble Rumble" (1970), Song Bird
- "Out There" (1970), Song Bird
- "Love Is the Greatest Science" (2011), Caltone
- "You Don't Remember Me" (2012), Tennors

Jackie Bernard/Jackie Bernard & the Kingstonians

- "Way Down in the Ghetto" (1973), Leal
- "Jah Children" (1974), Wambesi
- "Never Changing Harmony" (1975), Stun King
- "Original Style" (1975), Tough Jack
