= The Earth Dies Screaming (song) =

1980 single by UB40

- Cover of the 12-inch single

Single by UB40
- A-side: "Dream a Lie"
- Released: 24 October 1980
- Genre: Reggae; pop
- Length: 4:45
- Label: Graduate
- Songwriter: UB40
- Producers: Ray "Pablo" Falconer; UB40

UB40 singles chronology
"My Way of Thinking" / "I Think It's Going to Rain Today" (1980)	"The Earth Dies Screaming" / "Dream a Lie" (1980)	"Don't Let It Pass You By" / "Don't Slow Down" (1981)

"The Earth Dies Screaming" is a song by British reggae band UB40, released as their third single in October 1980 as a double A-side with "Dream a Lie". It continued the band's chart success, peaking at number ten on the UK Singles Chart.

== Background and release ==
The song was inspired and named after the 1964 science-fiction horror film. The lyrics were written by drummer Jimmy Brown, who in an interview prior to the release of the song said that when writing a song he liked to use "genre forms… using something popular to get our ideas across" and that in "The Earth Dies Screaming", "the story has a science-fiction setting to say what I want about now". At the time, the fear of the threat of nuclear war was prevalent and this is what the band referred to in the song.

The 12-inch version of the song differs to the 7-inch in that it begins with a dub instrumental before going into the main song. This diverged from the normal, with other 12-inch reggae songs typically featuring the dub instrumental after the main song. The 12-inch single also featured a different cover sleeve, depicting the band performing. The 7-inch featured a picture of the British UB40 unemployment benefit card which had also been used as the artwork for the band's album Signing Off, and so to avoid confusion with the 12-inch release due to their similarity in size, the artwork was changed.

== Track listings ==
7": Graduate / GRAD 10

1. "The Earth Dies Screaming" – 4:45
2. "Dream a Lie" – 2:53

12": Graduate / 12 GRAD 10

1. "The Earth Dies Screaming" – 8:20
2. "Dream a Lie" – 7:52

12": Graduate / 12 GRAD 10 (Netherlands)

1. "The Earth Dies Screaming" – 8:20
2. "Dream a Lie" – 7:52
3. "My Way of Thinking" – 6:45

== Charts ==
Chart (1980)	Peak position
UK Singles (OCC)	10
UK Independent Singles (Record Business)	1
