= My Way of Thinking =

1980 single by UB40

Single by UB40
- A-side: "I Think It's Going to Rain Today"
- Released: 6 June 1980
- Genre: Reggae
- Length: 3:20
- Label: Graduate
- Songwriter(s): UB40
- Producer(s): Bob Lamb; UB40

UB40 singles chronology
"King" / "Food for Thought" (1980)	"My Way of Thinking" / "I Think It's Going to Rain Today" (1980)	"The Earth Dies Screaming" / "Dream a Lie" (1980)

"My Way of Thinking" is a song by British reggae band UB40, released as their second single in June 1980. It was released as a double A-side with a cover of Randy Newman's "I Think It's Going to Rain Today", and peaked at number six on the UK Singles Chart.

== Release and reception ==
After its release, guitarist Robin Campbell described the lyrics as "very sexist [and that] it's supposed to be tongue-in-cheek though. The lyrics were made up in two and a half minutes to go with a tune we had". After the release of their debut album, Signing Off, lead singer Ali Campbell described the song as "awful" in comparison to the songs "I Think It's Going to Rain Today" and "Strange Fruit" which they had covered on the album.

Interviewing UB40 for Smash Hits after the release of "My of Thinking", Mike Stand described the song as a "disappointment [and that] the weakness, I feel, comes from a lack of emotion in the words. It's very ordinary boy 'n' girl stuff – nothing wrong with that, but it's just not their style". Reviewing "My Way of Thinking" for Record Mirror, Chris Westwood wrote that "UB40 reggae is barely unusually different to any other reggae; it's finely funnelled in the direction of chartland with pleasantly lilting rhythms and poking saxes [and that] it still isn't prepared to push itself hard enough to rock anyone's preconceptions, but that, of course, is hardly UB40's game".

== Track listings ==
7": Graduate / GRAD 8

1. "My Way of Thinking" – 3:20
2. "I Think It's Going to Rain Today" – 3:25

12": Graduate / 12 GRAD 8

1. "My Way of Thinking" – 6:43
2. "I Think It's Going to Rain Today" – 7:12

== Charts ==
Chart (1980)	Peak position
Ireland (IRMA)	12
UK Singles (OCC)	6
UK Independent Singles (Record Business)	2
