= The Jamaicans =

Jamaican ska/rocksteady group

- Origin: Jamaica
- Genres: Reggae, ska, rocksteady
- Years active: 1964–1972
- Labels: Trojan, Jamaican Gold, Treasure Isle
- Past members: Tommy Cowan; Norris Weir (Deceased); Martin Williams; Derrick Brown

The Jamaicans were a ska/rocksteady group formed in Jamaica in 1967, consisting of members Tommy Cowan, Norris Weir, Derrick Brown and Martin Williams.

== Career ==
The Jamaicans originally started out in 1964 as the Merricoles, consisting of Derrick Brown and childhood friend Norris Weir, joined later by Martin Williams (deceased), Flats Hylton, and I Kong. Then Tommy Cowan joined the group to make them a six-piece band. The group soon changed their name to The Jamaicans, at the behest of Canadian shipping agent Aston McKeachron, to increase the group's international appeal, cutting two singles for Duke Reid at Treasure Isle - "Pocket Full of Money" and "Diana". Kong and Brown left in 1967.

They had their first hit in 1967 with "Things You Say You Love". They would also take first place in the Island's Festival Song Contest in 1967 with the rocksteady classic "Ba Ba Boom" (by this time without Brown in the group), written by Cowan and Weir about the Jamaica Independence Festival. "Ba Ba Boom" was entered in the 1967 Independence Festival Song Competition (now known as the Popular Song Competition), which had been inaugurated by Festival organizers the previous year, and the Jamaicans took home the win that year with their entry, which became their best-known song.

In addition to "Ba Ba Boom", the Jamaicans had another local hit with "Things You Say You Love" and they recorded a cover of the Curtis Mayfield song "Dedicate My Song to You". Another song written and recorded by the trio, "Black Girl", was later covered by the disco group Boney M. The Jamaicans split up in 1972. Cowan went on to become a successful producer.

Weir relocated to the US shortly after the group disbanded in 1972, and became a "travelling singing missionary evangelist". He became an ordained minister in 2010, and recorded ten Gospel albums. He died on 16 November 2018 at his home in Port St. Lucie, Florida, aged 72. In May 2022, Martin Williams died from an illness he was battling for some time.

== Discography ==
=== Compilation albums ===
- Baba Boom Time (1996), Jamaican Gold

=== Singles ===
- "Things You Say You Love" (1967), Treasure Isle
- "Ba Ba Boom" (1967), Treasure Isle
- "Dedicated to You" (1967), Trojan
- "Peace and Love" (1968), Treasure Isle
- "Slow and Easy" (196?), Treasure Isle
- "Cool Night" (1968), Doctor Bird
- "Sing Freedom" (1970), Top Cat
- "Love Uprising" (1971), Dynamic Sounds
- "I Believe in Music" (1971), Jaguar
- "Take Warning" (197?), Jaguar
- "Mary" (1971), New Beat
- "Are You Sure" (1972), Dynamic Sounds
- "My Heart Just Keeps on Breaking" (1974), Dragon
- "Bad Man" (2000), Kingston 11
- "Chain Gang" (2012), Supreme
