= Rayón =

Rayón may refer to:

- Rayón, Chiapas, Mexico
- Rayón, State of México, Mexico
- Rayón, San Luis Potosí, Mexico
- Rayón, Sonora, Mexico
