= Winston Groovy =

Jamaican reggae singer

- Born: Winston Gilbert Tucker; 1946 (age 79–80); Kingston, Jamaica
- Genre: Reggae
- Years active: 1960s–present
- Labels: Pama, Trojan, Jive, W.G.
- Website: http://www.winstongroovy.com/

Winston Gilbert Tucker (born 1946), better known as Winston Groovy, is a Jamaican reggae singer best known for his recordings between the late 1960s and 1980s.

== Biography ==
Tucker was born in the Waltham Park Road area of Kingston, Jamaica in 1946. His first recording session was for producer and sound system operator King Edwards, which resulted in "She's Mine"; It was never released but was played exclusively on Edwards' sound system. Tucker relocated to Birmingham, England in 1961 to join his father. He joined The Ebonites while still at school and toured with the band. He moved to London in 1969 and began working with producer Laurel Aitken, adopting the stage name Winston Groovy. He had minor hits with "Yellow Bird" and "Standing on the Corner" and had his first big hit with the Lee "Scratch" Perry-produced "I Wanna Be Loved". With Aitken, he recorded a reggae version of Rufus Thomas' "Funky Chicken". Further 1970s singles included a cover version of Dr. Hook's "Sylvia's Mother", "Oh My My", "I've Got a Nose for Trouble", and "Please Don't Make Me Cry", recorded in 1970 for Eddy Grant's Torpedo label.

He continued to record in the 1980s and his career was given a boost in 1983 when UB40 recorded a version of "Please Don't Make Me Cry" for their Labour of Love album, which was also a top 10 single for the band. This led Trojan Records to reissue the original. Groovy had a minor hit in 1985 with a reggae version of The Commodores' "Nightshift", reaching number 83 in the UK.

In 1990, he set up the W.G. Records label, and released his self-produced albums Talking Love, Please Don't Make Me Cry and Coming on Strong.

In 2000, Groovy performed as a guest on UB40's Labour of Love III tour at the Brixton Academy and Wembley Arena, and he recorded the UB40 song "Don't Slow Down" for the 2002 album UB40 Present the Fathers of Reggae.

== Discography ==
=== Albums ===
- Presenting Winston Groovy (1974), Trojan
- The Groovy Collection (1978), Trojan
- African Girl (1984), Blue Moon
- Free the People (Groovin' with Winston Groovy) (1984), Pama
- Talking Love (199?), W.G.
- Please Don't Make Me Cry (199?), W.G.
- Coming on Strong (199?), W.G.
- Come Rock Me (1995), W.G./Jet Star
- The Best of Winston Groovy (1998), Rhino
- The Best of Vol. 2
- Step by Step (2002), W.G./Jet Star
- Please Don't Make Me Cry - The Anthology (2004), Trojan
- Back in Time With Mr. Groovy

=== Singles ===
- "Lover Come Back" (1969), Grape - B-side of King Horror's "The Hole"
- "Leaving Me Standing" (1969), Grape
- "Merry Xmas" (1969), Grape
- "Funky Chicken" (1969), Jackpot
- "Funny" (1969), Jackpot
- "Island in the Sun" (1969), Nu-Beat
- "Josephine" (1969), Nu-Beat
- "You Can't Turn Your Back on Me" (1970), Attack
- "I Like the Way" (1970), Crab
- "Standing on the Corner" (1970), Nu-Beat
- "Yellow Bird" (1970), Nu-Beat
- "Here Is My Heart" (1970), Nu-Beat
- "Groovin'" (1970), Nu-Beat
- "Tennessee Waltz" (1970), Nu-Beat
- "Please Don't Make Me Cry" (1970), Torpedo
- "I Wanna Be Loved" (1971), Bullet
- "I've Got to Find a Way to Win Mary Back" (1971), Crab
- "Don't Break My Heart" (1971), Pama
- "Free the People" (1971), Pama Supreme
- "What You Gonna Do" (1972), Pama Supreme
- "Sylvia's Mother" (1972), Pama Supreme
- "Get Back Together" (197?), Bullet
- "Heaven Help Us" (197?), Pama
- "News for My Baby" (197?), Horse
- "Your Cheating Heart" (197?), Horse
- "Oh My My" (1974), Trojan
- "I've Got a Nose for Trouble"
- "No One Day Love" (1977), Trojan
- "I'm Going Back" (1977), B&C
- "I Really Love You" (1978), Greenway
- "We Shall Overcome" (1978), Lover's Rock
- "Hello Robin Redbreast" (1979), Laser
- "Something on the Side" (1981), DJM
- "Adam & Eve" (1982), PRT
- "Don't Blame Me" (198?), Time
- "Paradise in Your Eyes" (198?)
- "So in Love With You" (198?)
- "Nightshift" (1985), Jive - UK #83
- "Rock Me Tonight" (1985), Jive
- "Blanket on the Ground" (1986), A1
- Equal Justice Equal Rights EP (199?), W.G. - four songs dedicated to Stephen Lawrence
- "Missing You" (199?), W.G.
- "All Because of You", EMI
- "Laugh and Grow Fat", Trojan
- "My Love Will Never Fade"
- "South of the Border"
- "To Give Your Lovin'"
- "You Made It Look So Easy" (1986)
- "Please Don't Make Me Cry" (????), Sound City - Winston Groovy & Bankie
