= Bournemouth Gardens, Jamaica =

Bournemouth Gardens
- Community
- Location within Jamaica
- Coordinates: 17°58′22.8″N 76°45′44.03″W
- Country: Jamaica
- City: Kingston
- Time zone: UTC-5 (EST)

Bournemouth Gardens is a neighborhood in the eastern area of Kingston, Jamaica, off of Kingston Harbour. It was previously called Barn Pen. Bellevue Hospital for mental illness is located in Bournemouth Gardens.

== Notable people ==
- Herman Sang grew up in Bournemouth Gardens.
