= The Slickers =

Jamaican reggae band

- Origin: Kingston, Jamaica
- Genres: Reggae
- Past members: Derrick Crooks; Sydney Crooks; Winston Bailey; Abraham Green; Roy Beckford

The Slickers were a Jamaican rocksteady and reggae group in the late 1960s and early 1970s.

The Slickers centred on Derrick Crooks, one of the founding members of The Pioneers along with his brother Sydney. In the mid-1960s, The Slickers consisted of the Crooks brothers and Winston Bailey. Derrick was the only constant member, with Abraham Green joining the Crooks brothers at the time "Johnny Too Bad" was recorded. The Slickers have often been wrongly assumed to simply be an alias for The Pioneers due to their similar vocal stylings. The Slickers toured the United Kingdom and United States on the back of the success of "Johnny Too Bad", and continued until 1979, when they recorded the Breakthrough album, before splitting up.

The song "Johnny Too Bad" was written by Trevor "Batman" Wilson, Winston Bailey, Roy Beckford and Derrick Crooks, as members of The Slickers. Performed by The Slickers, the song was used in the soundtrack for the 1972 Jimmy Cliff film, The Harder They Come, and was included in the soundtrack album. The album was far more successful than the film, selling well in the American and British markets, and Johnny Too Bad soon became a popular song to be played and recorded by other musicians and bands. It was covered by Jim Capaldi, drummer for the band Traffic, on his third solo album, 1975's Short Cut Draw Blood. Later it was also covered by the British reggae group UB40, the American reggae punk band Sublime, American power pop band The Silencers (1980, Columbia Records), and blues artist Taj Mahal. The Scottish folk singer-songwriter and guitar player John Martyn covered it in three different versions with additional lyrics, first on his 1980 album Grace and Danger, a second version recorded during the Grace and Danger sessions and then released on an extended Grace and Danger album in 1981. After he signed with Warner, Island Records released an extended 12" dub version, recorded prior to the Grace and Danger sessions, on 1982's The Electric John Martyn. The song was also part of bluegrass artist Peter Rowan's live repertoire during much of the mid-1980s and covered by the Jerry Garcia Band in late 1994 and 1995. The AfrAm string band, Sankofa Strings (Dom Flemons, Rhiannon Giddens, and Súle Greg Wilson) cover it on their 2006 album, "Colored Aristocracy".

== Albums ==
- Many Rivers to Cross (1976), Klik
- Breakthrough (1979), Tad's
