= Eric Donaldson =

Jamaican reggae singer-songwriter

- Born: 11 June 1947 (age 79); Bog Walk, Jamaica
- Origin: Saint Catherine, Jamaica
- Genre: Reggae
- Instruments: Vocalist and songwriter
- Years active: 1964–present
- Formerly of: The West Indians

Eric Donaldson (born 11 June 1947 in Bog Walk, Jamaica) is a Jamaican reggae singer-songwriter. He originated in Saint Catherine, Jamaica.

== Biography ==
Born in Kent Village, about two miles from Bog Walk, Donaldson first recorded for Studio One in 1964, although producer Clement Dodd declined to release the material. In the mid-1960s he formed The West Indians with Leslie Burke and Hector Brooks, and they had a hit with the J.J. Johnson-produced "Right On Time" in 1968, going on to record with Lee "Scratch" Perry and subsequently changing their name to the Kilowatts, but without further success.

Donaldson then pursued a solo career, and submitted "Cherry Oh Baby" to the 1971 Jamaican Festival Song Competition, going on to win the competition and giving him a big Jamaican hit single. Donaldson has won the competition six times, in 1971, 1977, 1978, 1984, 1993 and 1997. "Cherry Oh Baby" has been covered by both The Rolling Stones (on their 1976 album, Black and Blue) and UB40 (on their 1983 album, Labour of Love). The riddim has remained extremely popular – over 30 cover versions have been recorded, including an update by Donaldson himself. Two of his festival winners ("Sweet Jamaica" (1977) and "Land of My Birth" (1978)) were written by Winston Wallace. In an online poll held in 2013 by the Jamaica Cultural Development Commission, "Land of My Birth" was voted the most popular winner in the contest's history.

Donaldson currently lives in Kent Village, Jamaica.

== Discography ==
=== Albums ===
- Eric Donaldson (1971), Jaguar – reissued with bonus tracks as Love of the Common People
- Keep on Riding (1976), Dynamic Sounds
- Kent Village (1978), Dynamic Sounds
- Juan De Bolas (1980), Dynamic Sounds – also released as Stand Up
- Rock Me Gentle (1981), Serengeti
- Come Away (1982), Dynamic Sounds
- ‘Traffic Jam’ (1983)
- Right On Time (1985), Dynamic Sounds
- Rocky Road (1986), Capitol Records and EMI Nigeria.
- The System (1985), WEA – reissued as Children of Jah
- Crazy You Crazy Me (1988)
- Trouble in Afrika (1991)
- Blackman Victory (1993) – reissued with bonus tracks as Beautiful Day
- Peace and Love (1998), Joe Gibbs – reissued as Young and Reckless
- In Action (2000), Roots & Culture – with Sil Bell & Keith Coley
- Mr. Pirate (2004), Ice – reissued as 100% of Love

=== Compilation albums ===
- Cherry Oh Baby (1997), Trojan
- The Very Best of Eric Donaldson (1992), Rhino
- Very Best of Eric Donaldson (1998), Musicrama
- Oh What a Feeling (1998), Rhino
- Beautiful Day (1999)
- Freedom Street (1999), Rhino
- Super Medley Hits (2000), T.P.
- Greetings (2001), Rhino
- The Very Best of Eric Donaldson Vol.1 (2002), Rhino
- Anthology (2003), Creole
- Cherry Oh Baby (2003), Smith & Co
- Eric Donaldson Sings 20 Jamaica Classics (2004)
- Cherry Oh Baby (The Best Of) (2006), Trojan
