= Derrick Harriott =

Jamaican singer and record producer (1939–2026)

- Born: Derrick Clifton Harriott; 6 February 1939; Kingston, Jamaica
- Died: 24 October 2026 (aged 87)
- Genres: Reggae, ska, rocksteady
- Occupations: Singer, record producer
- Years active: 1958–2026
- Labels: Crystal, Trojan

Derrick Clifton Harriott OD (6 February 1939 – 24 October 2026) was a Jamaican singer and record producer. He was a member of the Jiving Juniors with Herman Sang before embarking on a solo career. Harriott produced recordings by Big Youth, Chariot Riders, The Chosen Few, Dennis Brown, The Ethiopians, Keith & Tex, The Kingstonians, Rudy Mills, Scotty, Sly & Revolutionaries, and Winston McAnuff.

== Life and career ==
=== Early life and The Jiving Juniors ===
Derrick Clifton Harriott was born in Kingston, Jamaica, on 6 February 1939. As a student at Excelsior High School, Harriott formed a duo with Claude Sang Jr. Harriott entered the Vere Johns Opportunity Hour talent contest as a solo artist in 1955, failing to reach the final round, and entered again in 1957 as a duo with Sang, going on to win several times. The duo first recorded for Stanley Motta, and went on to record for several producers, having hits including "Daffodil" and "Birds of Britain" before splitting up when Sang's job took him overseas.

In 1958 Harriott formed the Jiving Juniors with Eugene Dwyer, Herman Sang (Claude's younger brother), and Maurice Wynter. The group had success on the Vere Johns Opportunity Hour, and in 1960 and 1961 had hit singles with "Lollipop Girl" (for Duke Reid) and "Over The River" (aka "I'll Be Here When He Comes", for Coxsone Dodd). The group split up after Harriott emigrated to the United States, although the other members continued for a while with Jimmy Mudahy replacing Harriott. After struggling to find work, Harriott reformed the Jiving Juniors with a new line-up, having already teamed up again with Claude Sang in New York. The new line-up included Winston Service and Valmont Burke, and split their time between Jamaica and New York, where they recorded at the Mirasound Studios, having hits including "Sugar Dandy". The travelling took its toll and the group split up in 1962.

=== Solo and production career ===
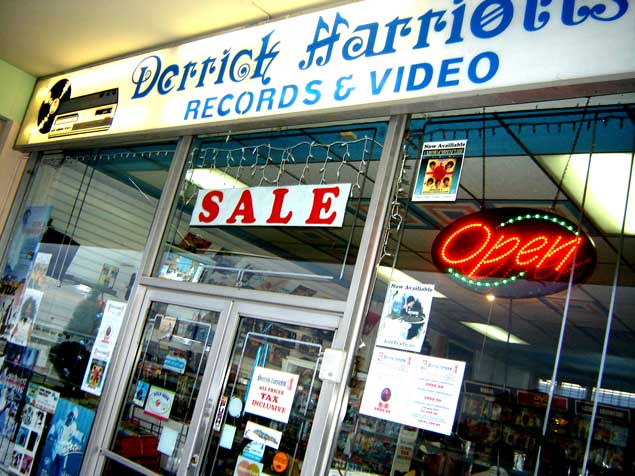
Derrick Harriott record shop, Kingston

Harriott embarked on a solo career and later formed his own record label, Crystal. His first solo release, "I Care", was a hit, with further hits following with "What Can I Do" (1964), "The Jerk" (1965) and "I'm Only Human" (1965), all of which were included on his debut album, The Best of Derrick Harriott. In 1967 he had further solo hits with "The Loser" and "Solomon", as well as with productions of other artists, including The Ethiopians' "No Baptism", and Keith And Tex's "Tonight" and "Stop That Train".

The lyrics to his song "Message from a Black Man" (circa 1970) echoed the growing black consciousness in American soul music of that time. In 1970 he issued the Crystalites' The Undertaker, an instrumental album in a similar vein to the early music of The Upsetters. He produced successful albums by other artists, including DJ Scotty's Schooldays, Dennis Brown's Super Reggae and Soul Hits, and also his own 14 Chartbuster Hits.

During the late 1960s and early 1970s, Harriott achieved significant success in the United Kingdom both as a performer and producer. Trojan Records operated the Song Bird and Explosion labels largely around his productions during this period. His work with the Crystalites incorporated motifs inspired by spaghetti western film scores and themes, particularly on instrumental recordings such as The Undertaker. In 1971, Swing magazine named Harriott the Top Producer of 1970. He was one of the first producers to use King Tubby mixing talents at his Waterhouse studio, issuing one of the earliest dub albums in 1974: Scrub A Dub, credited to the Crystallites. Harriott followed this with another dub/instrumental album, More Scrubbing The Dub. His late 1970s productions used backing from The Revolutionaries on albums such as Winston McAnuff's Pick Hits To Click (1978), DJ Ray I's Rasta Revival (1978) and his own Enter The Chariot and Disco 6 (a compilation album featuring Dennis Brown, Cornell Campbell and Horace Andy). In the 1970s he opened his first record shop on King Street in Kingston, later moving to larger premises at Twin Gates Plaza in Half-Way Tree.

In the 1980s, he continued to have hits with soul cover versions, such as "Skin To Skin" and "Checking Out". In 1988 he scored with "Starting All Over Again", a duet with Yellowman, with lyrics about Hurricane Gilbert. The mid to late 1990s saw solo efforts such as Sings Jamaican Rock Steady Reggae, For a Fistful of Dollars, Derrick Harriott & Giants, and Riding the Roots Chariot being released.

In July 2002 in Toronto, Ontario, Canada, Harriott performed at the two-night Legends of Ska festival. Other performers included: Skatalites, Rico Rodriguez, Lester Sterling, Johnny Moore, Lynn Taitt, Prince Buster, Alton Ellis, Lord Creator, Justin Hinds, Derrick Morgan and Lord Tanamo.

In 2009, Harriott was awarded the Order of Distinction by the Jamaican government, and in 2019 he received a Lifetime Achievement Award in Music from the Jamaica Reggae Industry Association (JaRIA).

=== Death ===
Harriott died at home on the morning of 24 October 2026, at the age of 87.

== Discography ==
=== Albums ===
- The Best of Derrick Harriott – 1965 – Island
- Rock Steady Party – 1967 – Island
- The Best of Derrick Harriott, Volume 2 – 1968 – Island
- Sings Jamaican Reggae – 1969 – Crystal/Pama
- The Crystallites: Undertaker – 1970 Trojan
- Psychedelic Train – 1970 – Crystal/Trojan
- Presents Scrub-A-Dub Reggae – 1974 – Crystal
- More Scrubbing The Dub – 1975 – Crystal
- Songs For Midnight Lovers – 1976 – Crystal/Trojan
- Derrick Harriott & The Revolutionaries: Reggae Chart Busters Seventies Style – 1977
- Reggae Disco Rockers – 1977 – Charmers
- Born to Love You – 1979 – Crystal

=== Compilation albums ===
- Derrick Harriott & Various Artists: 14 Chartbuster Hits – 1973 – Crystal
- Derrick Harriott & The Crystallites / Chariot Riders: Blockbuster Reggae Instrumentals – 1970
- Greatest Reggae Hits – 1975 – Crystal/Trojan
- Disco 6 – 1977
- Enter The Chariot – 1978
- Derrick Harriott & Various Artists: Those Reggae Oldies – 1978
- Derrick Harriott & The Jiving Juniors: The Donkey Years 1961–1965 – Jamaican Gold – 1993)
- Derrick Harriott & Various Artists: Step Softly 1965–1972 – Trojan – 1988
- Derrick Harriott: Sings Jamaican Rock Steady Reggae – Jamaican Gold
- Derrick Harriott & The Crystallites: For A Fistful of Dollars – Jamaican Gold
- From Chariot's Vault Volume 2: 16 Reggae Hits – Jamaican Gold
- Derrick Harriott & Various Artists: Riding the Roots Chariot – 1998 – Pressure Sounds
- Derrick Harriott & Various Artists: Skin To Skin – 1989 – Sarge
- Derrick Harriott & Various Artists: Musical Chariot – 1990 – Charly

== See also ==
- List of reggae musicians
- Island Records discography
- List of Jamaican record producers
- List of Jamaican backing bands
