= Jamaica Independence Festival =

The Jamaica Independence Festival is a celebration of Jamaica's independence, a status gained in 1962.

== History ==
The festival was initiated in 1962 by then Minister of Community Development (and later Prime Minister) Edward Seaga, to showcase literary, fine, and performing artists, and to celebrate "things Jamaican". The festival was considered integral to national development as a way of giving Jamaicans a sense of who they are, and what their history and culture is all about. The festival was scheduled for the first Monday in August, to coincide with the holiday to celebrate both independence and emancipation. The festival includes agricultural exhibitions, and street parades, climaxing in a grand gala at Kingston's National Stadium. Supporting events take place all over the island. A formal organizing group, the Jamaica Festival Commission was established by an act of parliament in 1968, which became the Jamaica Cultural Development Commission (JCDC) by another parliamentary act in 1980. Today, the administrative structure includes a large volunteer-base with a JCDC officer appointed to oversee activities in each parish. The festival now includes the Miss Jamaica Festival Queen Contest, a national mento band competition, and a gospel song competition.

One of the highlights of the festival is the Popular Song Competition (before 1990 known as the Independence Festival Song Competition), which first took place in 1966, and has been won by artists such as The Maytals, Desmond Dekker, Freddie McKay, and Eric Donaldson.

== Popular Song Competition ==
The Popular Song Competition has taken place since 1966, with the winners as follows:

- 1966 - The Maytals with "Bam Bam"
- 1967 - The Jamaicans with "Ba Ba Boom"
- 1968 - Desmond Dekker & The Aces with "Music Like Dirt (Intensified '68)"
- 1969 - The Maytals with "Sweet and Dandy"
- 1970 - Hopeton Lewis with "Boom Shacka Lacka"
- 1971 - Eric Donaldson with "Cherry Oh Baby"
- 1972 - Toots & the Maytals with "Pomps and Pride"
- 1973 - Morvin Brooks with "Jump In The Line"
- 1974 - Tinga Stewart with "Play de Music"
- 1975 - Roman Stewart with "Hooray Festival"
- 1976 - Freddie McKay with "Dance This Ya Festival"
- 1977 - Eric Donaldson with "Sweet Jamaica"
- 1978 - Eric Donaldson with "Land of my Birth"
- 1979 - The Astronauts with "Born Jamaican"
- 1980 - Stanley & The Turbines with "Come Sing With Me"
- 1981 - Tinga Stewart with "Nuh Wey Nuh Betta Dan Yard"
- 1982 - The Astronauts with "Mek Wi Jam"
- 1983 - Ras Karbi with "Jamaica I'll Never Leave You"
- 1984 - Eric Donaldson with "Proud to be Jamaican"
- 1985 - Roy Rayon with "Love Fever"
- 1986 - Stanley & The Turbines with "Dem a fe Squirm"
- 1987 - Roy Rayon with "Give Thanks and Praise"
- 1988 - Singer Jay with "Jamaica Land We Love"
- 1989 - Michael Forbes with "Stop and Go"
- 1990 - Robbie Forbes with "Island Festival"
- 1991 - Roy Rayon with "Come Rock"
- 1992 - Heather Grant with "Mek wi Put Things Right"
- 1993 - Eric Donaldson with "Big It Up"
- 1994 - Stanley & The Astronauts with "Dem a Pollute"
- 1995 - Eric Donaldson with "Join de Line"
- 1996 - Zac Henrry & Donald White with "Meck We Go Spree"
- 1997 - Eric Donaldson with "Peace and Love"
- 1998 - Neville Martin with "Jamaica Whoa"
- 1999 - Cheryl Clarke with "Born Inna JA"
- 2000 - Stanley Beckford with "Fi Wi Island A Boom"
- 2001 - Roy Richards with "Lift Up Jamaica"
- 2002 - Devon Black with "Progress"
- 2003 - Stefan Penincilin with "Jamaican Tour Guide"
- 2004 - Stefan Penincilin with "Ole Time Jamaica"
- 2005 - Khalil N Pure with "Poverty"
- 2006 - Omar Reid with "Remember the Days"
- 2007 - Neville 'Gunty' Winters with "Woman A Di Beauty"
- 2008 - Roy Rayon with "Rise and Shine"
- 2009 - Winston Hussey with "Take Back Jamaica"
- 2010 - Kharuso with "My Jamaica"
- 2011 - Everton David Pessoa with "Oh if We"
- 2012 - Abbygaye Dallas with "Real Born Jamaican"
- 2013 - The competition was not held in 2013
- 2014 - Rushane Sanderson with "I Love JA"
- 2015 - Lee-Roy Johnson with "Celebration"
- 2016 - Oneil Scott with "No Weh Like Jamaica"
- 2017 - The competition was not held in 2017
- 2018 - Oneil 'Nazzle Man' Scott with "Jamaica A Wi Home"
- 2019 - Raldene ‘Loaded Eagle’ Dyer with “Big Up Jamaica”
- 2020 - Buju Banton with "I am a Jamaican"
- 2021 - Stacious with "Jamaican Spirit"
- 2022 - Sacaj with "Nuh Weh Nice Like Yard"

In 2004, in a move to widen the genre of entries submitted, the JCDC announced a $1 million grand prize to be shared among songwriter, singer and producer of the winning entry. By 2010 the prize had risen to a million dollars and a car.

In 2008, the JCDC announced that the Jamaican Festival Song Competition title would return, running in parallel with the Popular Song Competition, hoping that the previous title would re-create feelings of celebration among Jamaicans at Independence time.
