= Keith & Tex =

Jamaican rocksteady duo

- Origin: Saint Andrew Parish, Jamaica
- Genre: Rocksteady
- Instrument: Vocals
- Years active: 1966–1970; 1994–present
- Labels: Move & Groove; Crystal; Island; KEBAR; Liquidator; Sounds Of Thunder
- Members: Keith Rowe; Phillip Texas Dixon

Keith & Tex are the Jamaican rocksteady duo of Keith Rowe and Phillip Texas Dixon, best known for their 1967 hit "Stop That Train".

== History ==
Keith Rowe (born Keith Barrington Rowe) grew up in the Washington Gardens area of Saint Andrew Parish, across the road from Lee "Scratch" Perry's home and future studio, on the outskirts of Kingston.

Phillip Texas Dixon grew up in the Pembroke Hall area and they were introduced by a mutual friend.

Starting out as a five man group singing on the corner in Pembroke Hall, they were encouraged to try to get recorded. They soon began auditioning for local producers but were rejected by Prince Buster, Coxsone Dodd and Duke Reid, the group having lost confidence broke up.

Keith and Tex were left and decided to continue the group. While seeking another opportunity to record, they eventually visited Derrick Harriott’s record store on King Street. Derrick was not in but they were encouraged to wait until he came to the shop. He listened to their cassette tape and decided to record them. They recorded “Tonight” that same week.

Working with Harriott, they recorded a series of singles in the late 1960s, including "Stop That Train" (a cover of The Spanishtonians' ska version), "Tonight", "This Is My Song", "Don't Look Back" (a cover of The Temptations' song), and "Let Me Be the One".

They ceased singing together in 1970, both emigrating with their families - Rowe to The United States and Dixon to Canada.

Rowe joined the US Army in 1972, staying in for 20 years, but also found time for music, recording as a solo artist, working with producer Lee "Scratch" Perry, releasing tracks such as "Groovy Situation" and "Living My Life", and recording further singles in the US, including a few on his own Kebar label.

Rowe and Dixon reunited for some live shows and released a new album in 1997 called Back Together Again.

Rowe later presented the Sounds of the Caribbean radio show on WBZC-FM for 19 years until March 2013 WBZC. Rowe currently hosts Reggae Rhapsody on VP Records' Reggae King Radio on Tuesdays at 12pm EST.

Their version of "Stop That Train" formed the basis of deejay Scotty's "Draw Your Brakes", which featured in the film The Harder They Come, and Big Youth's "Cool Breeze".

Keith & Tex began touring again in 2013 and are currently performing worldwide at various music festivals from Asia to Europe, Australia, and North and South America. They toured with “Inna Di Yard” in 2023 throughout France and Spain.

In 2015 they released a new album Just Passing Through on their Kebar Label, and released a new rocksteady album on March 20, 2017, Same Old Story, on the Liquidator Label.

In 2018 they released singles "Let's Sing" b/w "My Best Girl", and in 2019 "Global Politics" and "Only A Smile".

In 2019 they toured the UK, Brazil and Hong Kong. They completed two new albums both released in 2022 - Freedom featuring rocksteady music, and One Life To Live a roots reggae album.

In 2025 they released the new album "Gun Life" their third album for Liquidator Label and are currently touring in support of the album.

In 2026 they’ve released three singles, “Do for love, Perhaps, Perhaps, Perhaps, and Praise Thr Almighty “.

== Discography ==
=== Albums ===
- Stop That Train, (1991) Crystal
- Together Again (1997) Kebar
- Redux (2013) Kebar
- Redux (2014) Soulbeats Records
- Just Passing Through (2015) Kebar
- Same Old Story (2017) Liquidator
- Greatest Hits 1966-1970 (2019) Kebar, Rebel Sound
- Freedom (2022) Liquidator
- One Life To Live (2022) Sound Of Thunder
- Gun Life (2025) Liquidator

=== Singles ===
- "Tonight" (1967), Island
- "Stop That Train" (1967). Island
- "Hypnotizing Eyes" (1968), Island
- "This Is My Song" (1968), Move & Groove
- "Don't Look Back" (1968), Move & Groove
- "Let Me be The One" (1968), Move & Groove
- "Tighten Up Your Gird" (1969), Move & Groove
- "Down The Street" (1969), Move & Groove
- "Lonely Man" (1969), Move & Groove
- "What Kind Of Fool" (1969), Move & Groove
- "Leaving On The Train" (1969), Move & Groove
- "Back Into Your World" (2014), Kebar
- "Goodbye Love" (2016) Liquidator
- "Back In The Day" (2016) Liquidator
- ”Let’s Sing" (2018) Kebar
- ”My Best Girl" (2018) Kebar
- "Global Politics" (2019) Fruits Records
- "Only A Smile" (2019) Aquagem/VPAL
- "Left Behind" (2020) Aquagem/VPAL
- "What About Your Soul" (2020) Sounds Of Thunder
- "Sound System (Keith)" (2021) Aloe Vera Records
- "Music Sweet" (2021) Liquidator
- "My Sweet Love" (2021) Liquidator
- "Do For Love" (2026) Rebel Sound/Kebar
- ”Perhaps, Perhaps, Perhaps “ (2026) Rebel Sound/Kebar
- ”Praise The Almighty “ (2026) Rebel Sound/Kebar
