= Red Red Wine =

1967 single by Neil Diamond

Single by Neil Diamond

from the album Just for You
- B-side: "Red Rubber Ball"
- Released: 1967
- Genre: Soft rock; folk rock
- Length: 2:42
- Label: Bang
- Songwriter: Neil Diamond
- Producers: Jeff Barry; Ellie Greenwich

Neil Diamond singles chronology
"New Orleans" (1968)	"Red Red Wine" (1967)	"Brooklyn Roads" (1968)

"Red Red Wine" is a song originally written, performed and recorded by American singer Neil Diamond in 1967 that appears on his second studio album, Just for You. The lyrics are written from the perspective of a person who finds that drinking red wine is the only way to forget his woes.

UB40 recorded a cover version in 1983 for their album Labour of Love that went to No. 1 in the UK and was moderately successful in the United States. It was rereleased in 1988 and went to No. 1 on the Billboard Hot 100.

== Neil Diamond version ==
When Neil Diamond left the Bang Records label in 1968, the label continued to release his singles, often adding newly recorded instruments and background vocals to album tracks from his two albums for Bang, The Feel of Neil Diamond and Just for You (which included "Red Red Wine"). For the "Red Red Wine" single, Bang added a background choir without Diamond's involvement or permission. Diamond's version reached No. 62 on the Billboard Hot 100 chart in 1968. Billboard described the single as a "compelling, original folk-flavored ballad." Cash Box called it a "softie featuring a melancholy tale by a figure drowning his sorrow" with "dramatic vocal performance in a neatly styled arrangement."

A live version was released on Diamond's The Greatest Hits (1966–92), but the 1968 single version has never been issued on a vinyl album or CD. However, according to the liner notes in the booklet included in the 1996 box set In My Lifetime, the version of "Red Red Wine" erroneously indicates it is “from Bang single 556” but it is really the original, non-overdubbed mono album master of the track. A review of the original 1996 release of this box set show Diamond also released a live version on his 1972 album Hot August Night (but not as a single.)

Several artists covered the song shortly after Diamond's recording was released:

- In 1968, Dutch singer Peter Tetteroo (from the band Tee-Set) had a hit with a version that reached No. 6 on the Dutch Top 40 chart.
- Jamaican-born singer Tony Tribe recorded a reggae version of the song in 1969 that reached No. 46 on the UK Singles Chart. It became Trojan Records' first chart hit.
- Vic Dana's cover from his album If I Never Knew Your Name became his last Billboard Hot 100 hit, peaking at No. 72 in June 1970.

=== Charts ===
Chart (1968)	Peak position
U.S. Billboard Hot 100	62

== UB40 cover version ==
"Red Red Wine"

Single by UB40

from the album Labour of Love
- B-side: "Sufferin'"
- Released: 1983
- Recorded: 1982
- Genre: Reggae
- Length: 5:20 (album version); 3:01 (short version)
- Label: DEP (UK); A&M (US); Virgin
- Songwriter: Neil Diamond
- Producers: Ray "Pablo" Falconer; UB40

UB40 singles chronology
"I've Got Mine" (1983)	"Red Red Wine" (1983)	"Please Don't Make Me Cry" (1983)

UB40 recorded a version of "Red Red Wine" for their album of cover versions, Labour of Love. According to UB40 member Astro, the group's former vocalist and trumpet player, the band was only familiar with Tony Tribe's version and did not realize that the writer and original singer was Neil Diamond. Astro told the Financial Times, "Even when we saw the writing credit which said 'N Diamond,' we thought it was a Jamaican artist called Negus Diamond."

UB40's version features a lighter, reggae-style flavor than Diamond's somber, acoustic ballad. The UB40 version adds a toasted verse by Astro, opening: "Red Red Wine, you make me feel so fine/You keep me rocking all of the time," which was edited from the single that reached No. 1 on the UK Singles Chart in August 1983 and No. 34 in the US in March 1984. In the UK, it was the third best-selling single of 1983 with 550,000 sales.

In 1988, UB40 performed the song at the Nelson Mandela 70th Birthday Concert. Soon after, program director Guy Zapoleon of Phoenix-based KZZP placed the full version, including Astro's "rap", on the station's playlist, and it soon became the station's most popular song. With UB40 ready to release Labour of Love II, A&M Records promotion man Charlie Minor asked UB40 to hold off on releasing the album so that the label could reissue and promote "Red Red Wine". On the Billboard Hot 100 chart of October 15, 1988, the song reached a new peak at No. 1. In September 2014, the Official Charts Company announced that sales in the UK had reached one million. In 2023, it was included on the Official Charts Company's list of the UK's best-selling singles of all time at number 134.

Neil Diamond has stated that UB40's "Red Red Wine" is among his favorite covers of his songs. He frequently performs the song live using the UB40 reggae arrangement rather than that of the original version.

=== Charts ===
==== Weekly charts ====
Chart (1983)	Peak position
Australia (Kent Music Report)	2
Austria (Ö3 Austria Top 40)	5
Canada (The Record)	3
Canada Top Singles (RPM)	1
Denmark (Hitlisten)	2
Ireland (IRMA)	1
Netherlands (Dutch Top 40)	1
New Zealand (Recorded Music NZ)	1
Norway (VG-lista)	10
South Africa (Springbok Radio/Radio Orion)	1
Sweden (Sverigetopplistan)	14
Switzerland (Schweizer Hitparade)	8
UK Singles (Official Charts)	1
US Billboard Hot 100	34
US Mainstream Rock Airplay (Billboard)	41
West Germany (GfK)	12
Zimbabwe (ZIMA)	1

Chart (1988)	Peak position
US Billboard Hot 100	1
US Adult Contemporary (Billboard)	13

==== Year-end charts ====
Chart (1983)	Position
Australia (Kent Music Report)	32
Chart (1988)	Position
United States (Billboard)	39

=== Certifications ===
Region	Certification	Certified units/sales
Canada (Music Canada)	Gold	50,000^{^}
Denmark (IFPI Danmark)	Gold	45,000^{‡}
Netherlands (NVPI)	Gold	100,000^{^}
New Zealand (RMNZ)	7× Platinum	210,000^{‡}
Spain (Promusicae)	Gold	30,000^{‡}
United Kingdom (BPI)	2× Platinum	1,245,324
United States (RIAA)	Gold	500,000^{^}
^{^} Shipments figures based on certification alone.^{‡} Sales+streaming figures based on certification alone.

== Other cover versions ==
- Jimmy James and the Vagabonds released a 1968 cover version for the UK market from their album Open Up Your Soul. It charted at No. 36.
- Tony Tribe covered the song in 1969, reaching No. 46 on the UK chart.
- A 1970 remake by Vic Dana became a minor Billboard Hot 100 hit, peaking at No. 72, and reached No. 30 on the Adult Contemporary chart.
- In early 1972, singer Roy Drusky reached No. 17 on the Billboard Hot Country Singles chart and No. 16 on the RPM Country Tracks chart with a version from his album I Must Be Doin' Something Right.
- In 2000, the song was interpolated in a rap by British-American documentary filmmaker Louis Theroux. The rap was later remixed in 2022 by Duke & Jones in the single, "Jiggle Jiggle".
