= Pablo Falconer =

- Born: 1955
- Died: 15 November 1987; Hockley, West Midlands
- Genres: Reggae
- Occupation: Record producer

Ray "Pablo" Falconer (1955 – 15 November 1987) was an English reggae producer from Birmingham, England, active in the 1970s and 1980s. Brother to Earl Falconer from UB40, Falconer produced many singles and albums for that band.

Falconer died in a car crash in Birmingham in 1987. Earl Falconer, who was driving the car where his brother died, was sentenced at the time to six months' imprisonment for drunk driving, in June 1988.

== Influence on UB40 ==
In a 2013 interview for A Taste Of Dawn magazine UB40's founding member Jimmy Brown described the impact of Pablo Falconer's life and work on the band's music during their early years (and onwards):

Ray Pablo Falconer was Earl’s, the bass player, brother. He couldn’t play an instrument, but he wanted to be a part of the party. He started out knowing as little as we did. He had a love for the music and was greatly influenced by dub. From day one, he was our mixer from our first shows right until he died; much more in our live records even though he got coproduction credits for our [studio] records. He was the ninth member of our band. Whenever we were on stage, he was in control. Everything that went out up front was him. He was a bit sort of Mad Professor. He was just into what we were doing, and in the early days, that’s what made our live performances such an event. I[t] was because of the contribution he made up front. It left a massive hole when he died. It took us a while to get over it. He was our friend. That was [a] heavy time for us, and it took us a long time to find engineers who could (pause), well, nobody ever filled the hole; we just made do with very good engineers.

== Discography (partial) ==
- UB40 - "Red Red Wine", 20 August 1983
- UB40 - Labour of Love LP, 24 September 1983
- UB40 - "Please Don't Make Me Cry", 15 October 1983
- UB40 and Chrissie Hynde - "I Got You Babe", 3 August 1985
- UB40 - Baggariddim LP, 14 September 1985
- UB40 - "Don't Break My Heart", 26 October 1985
- UB40 - Live at Hammersmith
