= UB45 (album) =

2024 studio album by UB40

Studio album by UB40
- Released: 19 April 2024
- Studio: King Loud Studios
- Genre: Reggae
- Length: 55:54
- Label: SoNo

UB40 chronology
Bigga Baggariddim (2021)	UB45 (2024)

UB45 is the twenty-first studio album by UB40, released on 19 April 2024 by SoNo records. It was released physically and digitally, avalabile to buy as a CD and download. The album contains a mixture of new compositions, covers, and re-recordings of their past hits.

== Overview ==
The title of the album is a homage to the band celebrating 45 years since the bands professional career began. The album was recorded at King Loud Studios.

A track from the album, a cover of Brenton Wood's 1967 hit "Gimme Little Sign", was released as a single. According to the band, "Gimme Little Sign" was suggested to guitarist Robin Campbell by new lead vocalist Matt Doyle, unanware that the song had been on Campbell's long list of songs he had wanted the band to record since their 1983 cover album Labour of Love.

Archived recordings of founding member and saxophonist, Brian Travers, who died in 2021, were used in the album, and were hand picked out by his son Jamie, who also contributed keyboards to some of the tracks.

== Reception ==
The album peaked at number five on the UK Albums Chart, marking the first time the band had an album peak in the top 10 in the UK since 1998 with Labour of Love III, their first top 5 in the UK since Promises and Lies in 1993, and their fifth highest position charting album.

== Track listing ==
Side one

1. "Home" — 03:47 — written by Jimmy Brown, Robin Campbell, Matthew Doyle, Earl Falconer, Norman Hassan, Brian Travers
2. "Food For Thought" — 03:59 — written by Brown, Ali Campbell, Robin Campbell, Falconer, Hassan, Travers
3. "King" — 04:07 — written by Brown, Ali Campbell, Robin Campbell, Falconer, Hassan, Travers
4. "Champion" — 03:34 — written by Brown, Robin Campbell, Falconer, Daniel Francis, Hassan, Travers
5. "Tyler" — 03:17 — written by Brown, Ali Campbell, Robin Campbell, Falconer, Hassan, Travers, Mickey Virtue, Terence Wilson
6. "Trouble" — 03:56 — written by Brown, Robin Campbell, Doyle, Falconer, Hassan, Travers
7. "Red Red Wine" — 05:20 — Neil Diamond

Side two

1. "Fool Me Once" — 04:41 — written by Brown, Robin Campbell, Doyle, Falconer, Hassan, Travers
2. "Cherry Oh Baby" — 03:03 — written by Eric Donaldson
3. "Say Nothing" — 02:54 — written by Brown, Robin Campbell, Doyle, Falconer, Gilbert Gordon, Hassan, Travers
4. "Sing Our Own Song" — 04:54 — written by Brown, Robin Campbell, Doyle, Falconer, Hassan, Travers, Virtue, Wilson
5. "Gimme Some Kinda Sign" — 03:48 — written by Joe Hooven, Jerry Winn, Brenton Wood
6. "Kingston Town" — 04:08 — written by Kendrick Randolph Patrick
7. "Hope She'll Be Happier" — 04:26 — written by Bill Withers

Special edition bonus tracks:

1. "Forever True" (track 8 on side two)

== Personnel ==
UB40

- Jimmy Brown – drums
- Matt Campbell – backing vocals
- Robin Campbell – guitar, vocal arrangements, vocals
- Matt Doyle – vocals, guitar
- Earl Falconer – bass
- Gilly G – vocals
- Jahred Gordon – keyboards
- Norman Hassan – percussion, vocals
- Martin Meredith – alto sax, strings
- Laurence Parry – flugelhorn, Trombone, Trumpet
- Ian Thompson – tenor saxophone
- Brian Travers – saxophone (archived audio)
- Jamie Travers – keyboards

Additional

- Tim Debney - mastering
- Dee Johnson - backing vocals
- Austin Kilburn - engineer
- Linda Sandiford - backing vocals
- Bruno Tilley - album cover art designer
- Jamie Travers - mixing engineer, producer, keyboards
- Claude Villani - executive producer

== Charts ==
Chart (2024)	Peak position
UK Albums (Official Charts)	5
Switzerland Albums (Swiss Hitparade)	94
