= List of Britannia documentaries =

Britannia is a series of television documentaries by BBC Four that began in 2005. The documentaries mostly deal with the evolution of a music genre or other aspect of musical culture over a period of several decades within the United Kingdom, although some episodes have covered music in other countries (Ireland, the United States, Italy) or such diverse subjects as comic books, games, satirical literature, and wildlife. The programmes are usually presented in a three-episode format, but are often broadcast as one continuous block as part of a schedule of themed programming.

== Episodes ==
=== Jazz Britannia ===
A look at the history of British jazz music. Presented by Terence Stamp.

No.	Title	Original release date
1	"Stranger on the Shore"	28 January 2005
2	"Strange Brew"	4 February 2005
3	"The Rebirth of Cool"	11 February 2005

=== Folk Britannia ===
A look at the history of British folk music.

No.	Title	Original release date
1	"Ballads and Blues"	3 February 2006
Focuses on early collecting of British folk music, the influence of American folk music on the English folk music scene, the Ballads and Blues Club which became Ewan MacColl and Peggy Seeger's Singers Club, and Skiffle.
2	"Folk Roots, New Routes"	10 February 2006
From folk clubs to folk rock. It starts in the 1960s with the influence of Davey Graham. Overviews the changes in the traditional folk scene, including Martin Carthy and Annie Briggs. Donovan brings folk into the pop charts. Finally explores the folk rock in the late 1960 and early 1970s of The Incredible String Band, Pentangle, Fairport Convention and Steeleye Span.
3	"Between the Wars"	17 February 2006
Political folk in the last 1970s, through punk influence on folk in the 1980s, and the new generation of folk singers in the 1990s. Includes, The Men They Couldn't Hang, Billy Bragg, The Pogues, The Levellers, The Waterboys, Eliza Carthy, Jim Moray, Bellowhead, Beth Orton, Alasdair Roberts.

=== Classic Britannia ===
A look at the history of British classical music.

No.	Title	Original release date
1	"The Landscape Changes"	22 June 2007
2	"Modernism and Minimalism"	29 June 2007
3	"Adapt or Die"	6 July 2007

=== Soul Britannia ===
A look at the history of British soul music. Presented by Pauline Black.

No.	Title	Original release date
1	"I Feel Good"	20 July 2007
2	"Soul Rebels"	20 July 2007
3	"Keep on Movin'"	20 July 2007

=== Comics Britannia ===
A look at the history of British comics. Presented by Armando Iannucci.

No.	Title	Original release date
1	"The Fun Factory"	10 September 2007
2	"Boys and Girls"	17 September 2007
3	"X-Rated: Anarchy in the UK"	24 September 2007

=== Dance Britannia ===
A look at the history of British dance culture.

No.	Title	Original release date
1	"Dancehall Days"	27 December 2007
2	"Twist and Shout"	28 December 2007
3	"Dangerous Dancing"	29 December 2007

=== Pop Britannia ===
A look at the history of British pop music. Presented by Anne-Marie Duff.

No.	Title	Original release date
1	"Move It"	11 January 2008
2	"A Well Respected Man"	11 January 2008
3	"Two Tribes"	11 January 2008

=== Folk Hibernia ===
A look at the history of Irish folk music.

No.	Title	Original release date
1	"Gaelic"	14 March 2008
2	"Paddy"	14 March 2008
3	"Hibernian"	14 March 2008
4	"Celtic"	14 March 2008

=== Prog Rock Britannia: An Observation in Three Movements ===
A look at the history of British progressive rock music in the 1970s. Presented by Nigel Planer and featuring interviews with Joe Boyd, Arthur Brown, Gary Brooker, Robert Wyatt, Bill Bruford, Mike Oldfield, Bob Harris, Jonathan Coe, Steve Howe, Carl Palmer, Rick Wakeman, Pete Sinfield, Richard Coughlan, Mont Campbell, Phil Collins, Mike Rutherford, Tony Banks, Ian Anderson and Roger Dean.

No.	Title	Original release date
1	"The Shape of Things to Come: 1967-1970"	2 January 2009
Focusing on the foundations of prog that lay in psychedelic rock and jazz, from the shift of focus away from three-minute singles towards long play albums and experimental suites, to the emergence of the first prog bands featuring classically-trained middle-class youth influenced by contemporary music, and embracing the tradition of British eccentricity. Spotlighting Procol Harum, The Beatles, The Crazy World of Arthur Brown, The Nice, The Wilde Flowers, Soft Machine, Yes, King Crimson and Caravan.
2	"Close to the Edge: 1970-1973"	2 January 2009
Focusing on the development of various aspects of prog rock music, from the lyrical influence of classical literature, fantasy and science fiction, through the marriage of music and artwork, the increasingly complex and drawn-out process of writing and recording, to the theatricality of performance, and the genre's international success and popularity among a predominantly male audience. Spotlighting Genesis, Emerson, Lake and Palmer, Yes, Roger Dean, Soft Machine, King Crimson, Egg, Jethro Tull and Mike Oldfield.
3	"Brain Salad Surgery: 1974-1977"	2 January 2009
Focusing on the decline in popularity of prog rock, from the embracing of 1970s excess and self-indulgence, through the birth of punk rock as a response to the genre, and how prog became a four-letter word despite its influence on many musicians and songwriters associated with other genres. Spotlighting Yes, King Crimson, Genesis, ELP and The Sex Pistols.

=== Folk America ===
A look at the history of American folk music. Presented by Bernard Hill.

No.	Title	Original release date
1	"Birth of a Nation"	23 January 2009
2	"This Land is Your Land"	30 January 2009
3	"Blowin' in the Wind"	6 February 2009

=== Blues Britannia: Can Blue Men Sing the Whites? ===
(all 3 parts in 1 single 90" episode) A look at the history of British blues music. Presented by Nigel Planer and featuring interviews with Keith Richards, Jack Bruce, Chris Dreja, Chris Barber, Bill Wyman, Mick Fleetwood, Tony McPhee, Dave Kelly, Tom McGuinness, Paul Jones, Mike Vernon, Ian Anderson, John Mayall, Pete Brown, Val Wilmer, Phil Ryan, Champion Jack Dupree (archived), Bob Brunning, Phil May, Dick Taylor and Mick Abrahams.

No.	Title	Original release date
1	"Born Under a Bad Sign"	1 May 2009
Focusing on the rise in popularity of American blues music among the youth of post-war Britain, from the importing of blues records from the Southern United States, through the collaborations between British trad jazz bands and visiting American blues musicians, to the formation of the first British rhythm and blues combos. Spotlighting Muddy Waters, Memphis Slim, Howlin' Wolf, Son House, Chris Barber, Champion Jack Dupree and Blues Incorporated.
2	"Sittin' On Top of the World"	1 May 2009
Focusing on the immediate success of white British electric blues in the early-mid-1960s, from the first blues record to reach #1 in the UK charts, "Little Red Rooster" in 1964, through the role of young British rhythm and blues musicians playing as backing bands for the American blues singers that had inspired them, to the British Invasion bringing the genre to the attention of a wider mainstream audience, both in Britain and America. Spotlighting The Rolling Stones, The Animals, Them, Manfred Mann, The Groundhogs, John Lee Hooker, Sonny Boy Williamson, Jesse Fuller and Howlin' Wolf.
3	"Crossroads"	1 May 2009
Focusing on the shift of established British bands away from playing blues covers to writing their own rock and pop compositions, the second wave of young British blues musicians wanting to play a more "pure" form of the genre, and the runaway international success of blues rock groups playing a fusion of blues, hard rock, jazz and psychedelic rock in the late 1960s and 1970s. Spotlighting The Yardbirds, Eric Clapton, John Mayall and the Bluesbreakers, Cream, Fleetwood Mac, Jethro Tull, Peter Green and Led Zeppelin.

=== Synth Britannia ===
A look at the history of British synthesizer-based electronic music. Featuring interviews with Richard H. Kirk, Bernard Sumner, Philip Oakey, Simon Reynolds, Wolfgang Flür, Andy McCluskey, Martyn Ware, Daniel Miller, Paul Humphreys, John Foxx, Cosey Fanni Tutti, Chris Carter, Gary Numan, Susanne Sulley, Joanne Catherall, Martin Gore, Vince Clarke, Andrew Fletcher, Dave Ball, Alison Moyet, Midge Ure, Neil Tennant and Chris Lowe.

No.	Title	Original release date
1	"Part One: Alienated Synthesists"	16 October 2009
Focusing on the development of British synth music throughout the 1970s, from the wide exposure that synthesizers gained from their use in prog rock and the groundbreaking Clockwork Orange soundtrack, through the development of affordable synth keyboards and subsequent emergence of the first post-punk and industrial synth bands made up of working-class youths influenced by krautrock and punk music and dystopian science fiction literature by such authors as J. G. Ballard, to the formation of Mute Records and breakthrough success of synthpop towards the end of the decade, specifically "Are Friends Electric?" and "Cars" in 1979. Spotlighting Wendy Carlos, Kraftwerk, The Clash, The Normal, The Human League, Giorgio Moroder, Cabaret Voltaire, OMD, Joy Division, Ultravox, Throbbing Gristle and Gary Numan.
2	"Part Two: Construction Time Again"	16 October 2009
Focusing on the commodification of synthpop in the early 1980s, from the focal shift away from experimental post-punk towards the mainstream pop market, through the new-found popularity of previously unsuccessful bands and emergence of newly formed pop duos that juxtaposed cold synth instruments with warm soulful vocals, to the development of samplers such as the Mellotron and the E-mu Emulator, culminating in the birth of electronic dance music, specifically beginning with "Blue Monday" in 1983. Spotlighting Depeche Mode, The Human League, Heaven 17, Cabaret Voltaire, Soft Cell, Yazoo, OMD, Eurythmics, Ultravox, Kraftwerk, Pet Shop Boys and New Order.

=== Games Britannia ===
A look at the history of the British games industry. Presented by Benjamin Woolley.

No.	Title	Original release date
1	"Dicing with Destiny"	7 December 2009
2	"Monopolies and Mergers"	14 December 2009
3	"Joystick Generation"	21 December 2009

=== Heavy Metal Britannia ===
A look at the history of British heavy metal music. Presented by Nigel Planer.

No.	Title	Original release date
1	"The Beast Awakes"	5 March 2010
2	"The Beast Rides Out"	5 March 2010
3	"Triumph of the Beast"	5 March 2010

=== Opera Italia ===
A look at the history of Italian opera music. Presented by Antonio Pappano.

No.	Title	Original release date
1	"Beginnings"	24 May 2010
2	"Viva Verdi"	31 May 2010
3	"The Triumph of Puccini"	7 June 2010

=== Rude Britannia ===
A look at the history of British satire. Presented by Julian Rhind-Tutt.

No.	Title	Original release date
1	"A History Most Satirical, Bawdy, Lewd and Offensive"	14 June 2010
2	"Presents Bawdy Songs and Lewd Photographs"	15 June 2010
3	"You Never Had It So Rude"	16 June 2010

=== Birds Britannia ===
A look at the history of British birds. Presented by Bill Paterson.

No.	Title	Original release date
1	"Garden Birds"	3 November 2010
2	"Waterbirds"	10 November 2010
3	"Seabirds"	17 November 2010
4	"Countryside Birds"	24 November 2010

=== Festivals Britannia ===
A look at the history of British music festivals.

No.	Title	Original release date
1	"Part I: Something in the Air"	17 December 2010
2	"Part II: Ramble On"	17 December 2010
3	"Part III: A Rush & a Push and the Land is Ours"	17 December 2010

=== Reggae Britannia ===
A look at the history of British reggae music. Presented by Ruby Turner and featuring interviews with Dennis Bovell, Boy George, Ali Campbell, Jerry Dammers, Don Letts, Dave Barker, Paul Weller, Paul Simonon, Prince Buster, Max Romeo, Pauline Black, Chris Blackwell, Sugar Minott, Bunny Lee, Bob Andy, Kentrick Patrick, Steve Barrow, Bigga Morrison, Brinsley Forde, David Hinds, Linton Kwesi Johnson, Sylvia Tella, Astro, Big Youth, Al Capone, Tippa Irie, Robin Campbell, Wayne Perkins, John "Rabbit" Bundrick, Mykaell Riley, Viv Albertine, Stewart Copeland, Andy Summers, Rhoda Dakar, James Brown, Neville Staple, Rico Rodriguez, Winston Reedy, Carroll Thompson, Janet Kay, Smiley Culture, Jazzie B and Caron Wheeler.

No.	Title	Original release date
1	"Part One: Hard Road to Travel"	11 February 2011
Focusing on the roots of British reggae, from the importing of Jamaican music from independent labels such as Island Records in the mid-1960s, through the first reggae songs to top the UK charts, specifically "My Boy Lollipop" reaching #2 in 1965 and "Israelites" reaching #1 in 1969, to the genre being adopted by the mod and skinhead communities and used as a symbol of identity by the British black youth in the early 1970s, allowing Jamaican reggae artists to escape their home country's violent political turmoil by emigrating to Britain. Spotlighting Desmond Dekker, Dave and Ansell Collins, Max Romeo, Toots and the Maytals, Millie Small, Nicky Thomas, Bob and Marcia, Big Youth and Al Capone.
2	"Part Two: Catch a Fire"	11 February 2011
Focusing on the emergence of homegrown talent and development of the British reggae sound, from the wider audience appeal that came with the fusion of roots reggae with pop and rock music in the early 1970s, through the emergence and popularity of British sound systems, to the use of music to protest the inherent racism in British society in the mid 1970s. Spotlighting Bob Marley and the Wailers, Eric Clapton, Matumbi, Aswad and Steel Pulse.
3	"Part Three: Stir It Up"	11 February 2011
Focusing on the integration of black and white music, from the kinship felt between the angry youths of the reggae and punk communities, culminating in the Rock Against Racism campaign and punk-reggae collaborations in the late 1970s, through the birth of the 2 Tone ska revival subgenre, to the success of mixed-race political reggae bands using their music as social commentary on "Thatcher's Britain". Spotlighting Steel Pulse, The Clash, The Slits, Linton Kwesi Johnson, The Police, The Specials, The Selecter and UB40.
4	"Part Four: Nice Up the Dance"	11 February 2011
Focusing on the shift away from reggae as angry protest music towards the mainstream pop market, from the genre's decline in popularity following the death of Bob Marley in 1981, through the emergence of lovers rock, to the assimilation of reggae into other genres in the 1980s, specifically electronic dance music. Spotlighting UB40, Winston Reedy, Sugar Minott, Carroll Thompson, Janet Kay, Culture Club, The Police, Musical Youth, Smiley Culture, Tippa Irie and Soul II Soul.

=== Mixed Britannia ===
A look at the history of the British mixed-race population. Presented by George Alagiah.

No.	Title	Original release date
1	"1910–1939"	6 October 2011
2	"1940–1965"	13 October 2011
3	"1965–2011"	20 October 2011

=== Punk Britannia ===
A look at the history of British punk music. Presented by Peter Capaldi.

No.	Title	Original release date
1	"Pre-Punk: 1972-1976"	1 June 2012
2	"Punk: 1976-1978"	8 June 2012
3	"Post-Punk: 1978-1981"	15 June 2012

=== Pop Charts Britannia: 60 Years of the Top 10 ===
A look at the history of the UK Singles Chart.

No.	Title	Original release date
1	"Part 1: 1952-1969"	16 November 2012
2	"Part 2: 1969-1989"	16 November 2012
3	"Part 3: 1990-2012"	16 November 2012

=== 50s Britannia ===
A look at British rock and jazz music in the pre-Beatles era. Presented by Roger McGough.

No.	Title	Original release date
1	"Rock 'n' Roll Britannia"	17 May 2013
Documentary about British youth's attempts to copy American rock 'n' roll in the late 1950s.
2	"Trad Jazz Britannia"	24 May 2013
Documentary looking at Britain's post-war infatuation with old New Orleans jazz.

=== Psychedelic Britannia ===
A trip through the most visionary period in British music history - five kaleidoscopic years between 1965 and 1970, when a handful of dreamers reimagined pop music. Presented by Nigel Planer. Originally broadcast 23 October 2015.

== Bibliography ==
- Tim Wall & Paul Long (2009). 'Jazz Britannia: Mediating the story of British jazz on television', Jazz Research Journal, 3(2):145-‐170.
- Paul Long & Tim Wall (2010). 'Mediating Popular Music Heritage: British television's narratives of popular music's past' in Ian Inglis (ed.), Popular Music on British Television, Ashgate.
