= Walsh Hall, Meriden =

Timber-framed building in Meriden, England

Coordinates: 52.4415°N 1.6324°W

Walsh Hall is a six-bedroom, Grade II* listed house on Walsh Lane, Meriden, West Midlands (originally Warwickshire), England.

It comprises a 16 foot (4.9 m) bay of a 15th-century hall, with original roof truss, and 16th century additions. The timber frame sits on an ashlar base. The infill is whitewashed, and the chimneys are in red brick. An additional wing was added sometime in the early-to-mid 20th century.

The hall sits in 4.8 acres (1.9 ha) of land, and was given listed status in November 1952. It lies adjacent to and north of the Meriden Bypass, part of the A45, which separates the hall from the centre of Meriden, to the south-west.

The hall was once owned by musician Jeff Lynne, founding member of Electric Light Orchestra, who sold it to UB40's Robin Campbell in 1995, and moved to Beverly Hills, California. Campbell put the house back on the market in 2013, when it was valued at around £1.65 million.
