= Shakalaka =

Shakalaka may refer to:

== Music ==
=== Titles ===
- "Boom Shaka Laka Laka", a 1970 song by Hopeton Lewis
  - A 2010 cover of the same song, by UB40 on their album Labour of Love IV
- "Boom Shack-A-Lak", 1993 song by artist Apache Indian
- "Boom Shakalaka", a song from the 1996 film Muppet Treasure Island
- "Shakalaka Baby", 2002 song from the film Nayaka
- "Boom Shacka", a 2010 song by Brianna and Flo Rida
- "Shakalaka", a 2018 original mix by Steve Aoki, Deorro, MAKJ & Max Styler
- "Boomshakalaka", a 2019 song by Dimitri Vegas & Like Mike
- "Shaka laka", a 2023 song by 6ix9ine featuring Kodak Black & Yailin la Más Viral

=== Lyrics ===
- "I Want to Take You Higher”, a 1968 song by Sly and The Family Stone, with the lyric “boom lacka-lacka-lacka"
  - A 1970 cover of the same song, by Ike and Tina Turner, with the lyric "boom shaka-laka-laka"
- "Walk The Dinosaur", a 1987 song by Was (Not Was), with the lyric "boom boom acka-lacka boom boom"
- "Whoomp! (There It Is)", a 1993 song by Tag Team, with the lyric "boom shaka laka"
- "We're the Titans", a song in the 1998 film Hercules and Xena – The Animated Movie: The Battle for Mount Olympus, with the lyric "boom shaka-laka-laka"
- "Boom", a 2009 song from Anjulie (album), with the lyric “boom shalaka-laka, boom, boom”
- "Fantastic Baby", a 2012 song by Big Bang, with the lyric "boom shaka-laka"

== Other uses ==
- Shakalaka Shankar, an Indian actor
- NBA Jam (1993 video game), with the exclamation "Boom-shaka-laka"
- Shakalaka Baby (film), a 2002 Indian Tamil-language film directed by Rama Narayanan
- Shaka Laka Boom Boom, a 2002 children's television series
- Shakalaka Boom Boom, 2007 Indian thriller/drama film directed by Suneel Darshan
- Kid Krrish: Shakalaka Africa, a 2015 Indian animated film

== See also ==
- Chakalaka, a vegetable dish from South Africa
- Sakalakala Vallavan (disambiguation)
- Shakatak, an English jazz-funk band
