= Labour of Love IV =

Studio album by UB40
- Released: 8 February 2010
- Recorded: 2009
- Genre: Reggae
- Length: 59:20
- Label: Virgin Records

UB40 chronology
TwentyFourSeven (2008)	Labour of Love IV (2010)	Getting Over the Storm (2013)

Professional ratings
Review scores
Source	Rating
Allmusic	3/5 stars

Labour of Love IV is the seventeenth album and fourth covers album by UB40, released on the Virgin Records label in 2010. It is the first UB40 album not to feature the classic line-up as longtime UB40 vocalist/guitarist Ali Campbell and keyboardist Mickey Virtue both departed the band in 2008; consequently it is the first album by the band to feature vocalist Duncan Campbell.

== Track listing ==
1. "Don't Want To See You Cry" (original by Ken Boothe) – 3:50
2. "Get Along Without You Now" (original by Roy Hogsed) – 3:49
3. "Bring It On Home to Me" (original by Sam Cooke) – 4:34
4. "Cream Puff" (original by Johnny Nash) – 2:50
5. "Easy Snappin'" (original by Theo Beckford) – 3:11
6. "Holiday" (original by The Sensations) – 3:42
7. "Close To Me" (original by Derrick Harriott) – 3:56
8. "Man Next Door" (original by The Paragons) – 5:14
9. "Tracks of My Tears" (original by Smokey Robinson and The Miracles) – 3:23
10. "True, True, True" (original by Ken Parker) – 2:55
11. "Boom Shacka Lacka" (original by Hopeton Lewis) – 3:32
12. "You're Gonna Need Me" (original by Errol Dunkley) – 3:00
13. "A Love I Can Feel"(original by John Holt) – 4:01
14. "Baby Why" (original by Keble Drummond) – 3:35
