= Getting Over the Storm =

Studio album by UB40
- Released: 2 September 2013
- Genre: Reggae; country
- Length: 51:50
- Label: Virgin/Universal

UB40 chronology
Labour of Love IV (2010)	Getting Over the Storm (2013)	For the Many (2019)

Professional ratings
Aggregate scores
Source	Rating
Metacritic	52/100
Review scores
Source	Rating
Exclaim!	6/10
MusicOMH	3/5 stars

Getting Over the Storm is the eighteenth studio album by English reggae band UB40. It was released on 2 September 2013. It is the final UB40 album to feature trumpet player and vocalist Astro, due to his departure in late 2013. It is also their last to be released on Virgin.

== Background and release ==
Their first album since the 2010 album Labour of Love IV, it features cover versions of songs either written or recorded by country music artists together with five original UB40 songs. The country music tracks include the Randy Travis song "On the Other Hand",' George Jones' "Getting Over the Storm", Willie Nelson's "Blue Eyes Crying in the Rain", Buck Owens "Crying Time" and Jim Reeves' "He'll Have to Go". Upon the album's release UB40 singer Astro defended the inclusion of country music on a UB40 album, saying, "In the Caribbean, there are very few households that do not own a Jim Reeves album. I certainly had them in my house, as did all my West Indian friends when I was growing-up. When you'd go their houses you'd always see Jim Reeves staring back at you from the Blue Spot Gramophone! Country music and Jamaica are so finely entwined." However, just two months later Astro had quit the band, citing the album's musical direction as a major factor in his decision: "My heart just isn't in the new album where my contribution has been reduced to a backing vocalist which, as our fans know, is not my role in the group. I'm a front man, a lead vocalist. While it may be true there is a long relationship with reggae musicians and country music, that doesn't mean that's what I want to play, far from it, and it's definitely not something I wish to be part of."

== Track listing ==
All tracks are written by James Brown, Duncan Campbell, Robin Campbell, Earl Falconer, Norman Hassan, Brian Travers and Terence Wilson, except where noted.

No.	Title	Writer(s)	Length
1.	"Midnight Rider"	Gregg Allman, Robert Kim Payne	4:09
2.	"I'm Pretty Sure That's Just What's Killing Me"		4:38
3.	"Getting Over the Storm"	John Riggs	3:27
4.	"Blue Bilet Doux"		3:27
5.	"If You Ever Have Forever in Mind"	Vince Gill, Troy Seals	4:25
6.	"Crying Time"	Buck Owens	3:15
7.	"How Will I Get Through This One"		4:11
8.	"He'll Have to Go"	Audrey Allison, Joe Allison	4:18
9.	"Blue Eyes Crying in the Rain"	Fred Rose	3:26
10.	"I Did What I Did"		3:14
11.	"On the Other Hand"	Paul Overstreet, Don Schlitz	3:51
12.	"How Can a Poor Man Stand Such Times and Live?"	Brown, D. Campbell, R. Campbell, Falconer, Hassan, Alfred Reed, Travers, Wilson	4:44
13.	"I Didn't Know That I"		4:45

== Release history ==
Region	Date	Label	Format	Catalog
United Kingdom	2 September 2013	Virgin	CD	CDV3113
Europe	2 September 2013	Universal	CD	00602537406173

== Chart positions ==
Year	Chart	Position
2013	United Kingdom Albums Chart	29
