= Hare and Hounds, Kings Heath =

Listed pub in Birmingham, England

Hare and Hounds
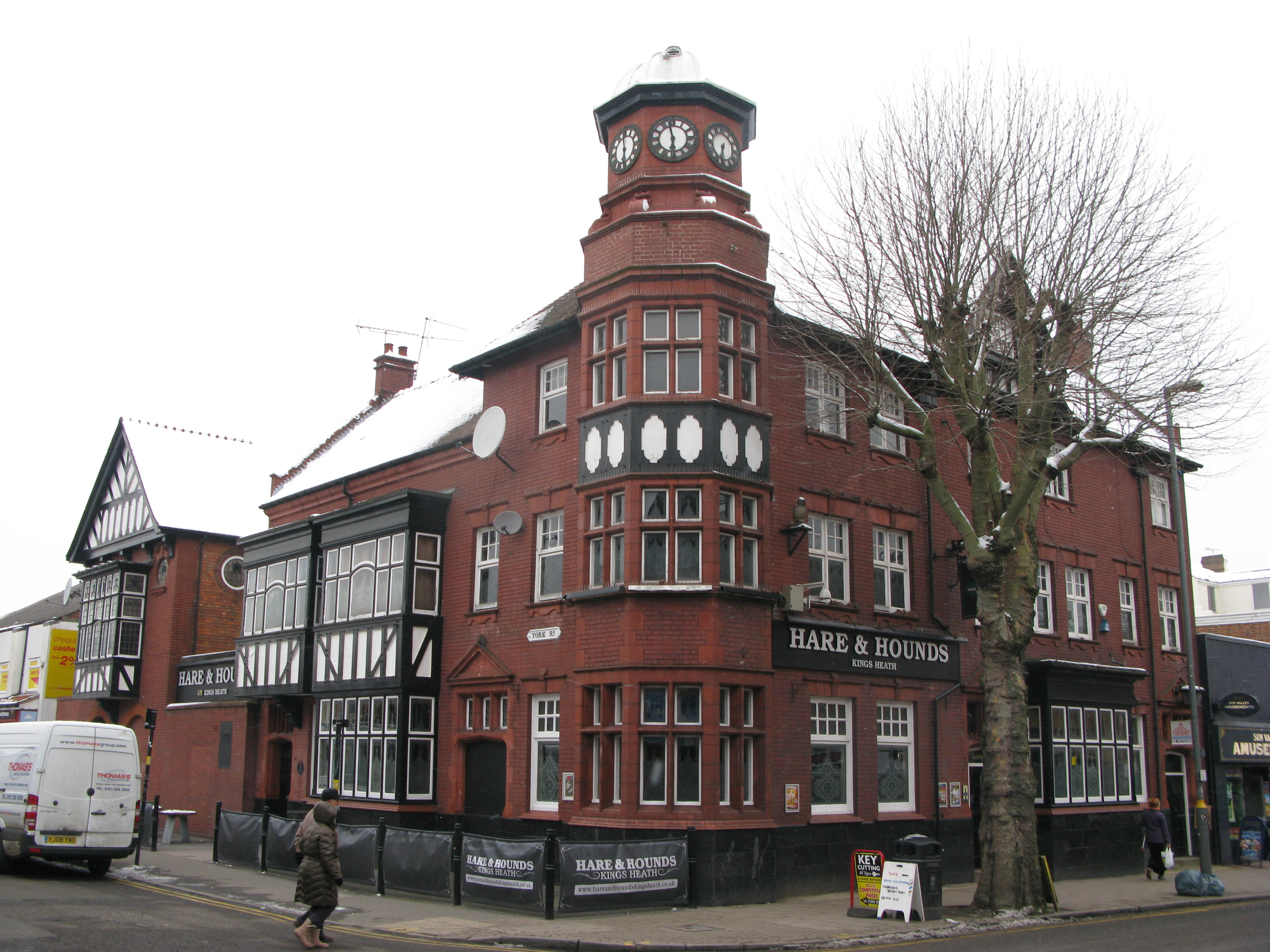
- The pub in 2013

General information
- Type: Public house
- Location: 106 High Street, King's Heath, Birmingham, England
- Coordinates: 52.4347°N 1.8930°W
- Opening: 1907; 119 years ago
- Client: Holt Brewery Company
- Owner: Greene King

Design and construction
- Architect: Samuel Owen
- Designations

Listed Building – Grade II
- Official name: The Hare and Hounds public house
- Designated: 24 August 1995
- Reference no.: 1217149

Other information
- Seating capacity: 250 standing (venue 1); 150 standing (venue 2)

Website
- hareandhoundskingsheath.co.uk

The Hare and Hounds is a Grade II listed public house and music venue on High Street in the Kings Heath area of Birmingham, England. The present building was constructed in 1906–07 to designs by Samuel Owen for the Holt Brewery Company, replacing an earlier pub on the site. It retains a notable early 20th-century interior, including extensive Art Nouveau-style tiling by Maw & Co., and is included on the Campaign for Real Ale (CAMRA)'s National Inventory of Historic Pub Interiors, where it is recognised as being of "outstanding national historic importance". The venue is also known as the site of UB40's first public performance in 1979.

== History ==
The present building was designed by Samuel Owen of Owen & Ward and constructed in 1906–07, replacing an earlier public house on the site. The date 1907 is recorded in the gable. Although the redevelopment was carried out by Charles H. Collett, the project was undertaken for the Holt Brewery Company, which acquired the rebuilt premises in 1910. The building has undergone only minor alterations during the 20th century.

On 24 August 1995, the Hare and Hounds was designated a Grade II listed building. The pub is regarded by the Campaign for Real Ale (CAMRA) as having an interior of "outstanding national historic importance" and is rated three stars on its National Inventory of Historic Pub Interiors.

The Hare and Hounds has hosted performances by numerous artists including Ed Sheeran, Ellie Goulding and Basement Jaxx, before they achieved wider recognition. The venue is also notable as the site of UB40's first public performance in 1979. A PRS for Music Heritage Award plaque was unveiled in 2011 to commemorate the occasion. In 2016, the Hare and Hounds won the Best Live Entertainment award at the Great British Pub Awards. As of October 2024 the freehold was owned by Greene King.

== Architecture ==
=== Exterior ===
The building stands on a corner site and is constructed of red brick with terracotta detailing, a tiled roof and a polished granite plinth. It rises to three storeys, with a central gable bearing the name "Hare and Hounds" and the date 1907. Most of the windows are casements with small-paned upper lights. A prominent polygonal corner bay extends through all three storeys and continues above the roofline as an octagonal clock turret capped by a lead dome. The High Street frontage includes entrances to the former outdoor department and bar, while the York Street elevation incorporates a three-storey section with a terracotta-pedimented doorway and a lower two-storey range with bay windows. An adjoining gabled section has decorative mock timber framing and a projecting oriel window at first-floor level; the arched openings below have been altered.

=== Interior ===
Although some partitions have been removed, the interior retains many of its historic features, including a mahogany bar counter, an ornate mirrored bar-back, extensive glazed wall tiling and fixed upholstered seating. Much of the tiled decoration was produced by Maw & Co., and includes extensive Art Nouveau-style designs that survive throughout the entrance hall, staircase and first-floor corridor. The hall also retains a terrazzo floor, and a suspended clock by Marsh & Co. of Birmingham dated 1907 remains in situ. The glazed tiling continues up the staircase and along a corridor leading to a function room, which features a barrel-vaulted ceiling with decorative plasterwork, including moulded ribs, a frieze, pilasters and garlands.

The public bar retains decorative green and cream tiling with a tiled frieze incorporating floral and face motifs, while the rear lounge preserves historic fixed seating, original bar fittings and a decorative fireplace with copper detailing featuring a hare-and-hound motif. The former billiard room also retains fixed seating, etched windows and an original fireplace, although it has since been adapted for other uses.
