= Sakalakala Vallavan =

Sakalakala Vallavan (lit. 'Almighty Man') may refer to:

- Sakalakala Vallavan (1982 film), Indian Tamil-language film
- Sakalakala Vallavan (2015 film), Indian Tamil-language film

== See also ==
- Shakalaka (disambiguation)
- Sakalakala Wallabha, 16th-century king of Udugampola in the Kingdom of Kotte, mentioned in the Sri Lankan chronicle Rajavaliya
- Sakalakalashala, a 2019 Indian Malayalam-language comedy-drama film
