= Heritage Award =

British musical award plaque

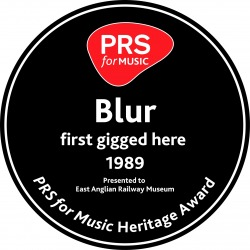
A PRS for Music Heritage Award celebrating Blur's first gig in 1989 at the East Anglian Railway Museum near Colchester

The PRS for Music Heritage Award is a ceremonial plaque installed in a public place to commemorate a link between a famous musician or music band and the location they performed their first live gig. The UK-wide plaque is awarded and funded by PRS for Music.

== History ==
The PRS for Music Heritage Award was created in 2009 by PRS for Music in order to celebrate the first performances of the UK's leading bands. The inaugural award is seen as a unique scheme to celebrate UK music venues which have played a pivotal role in launching the careers of some of the country's most iconic music acts. The first Heritage Award was presented to the UK Britpop band Blur on 30 November 2009 by PRS for Music chairman Ellis Rich.

== Recipients of award ==
Date	Band	Location
30 November 2009	Blur	East Anglian Railway Museum, Essex
3 December 2009	Dire Straits	Farrer House, Deptford, London
25 February 2010	Jethro Tull	Holy Family Church, Blackpool
23 March 2010	Squeeze	Dance Hall, Greenwich, London
29 May 2010	Elton John	The Namaste Lounge, Watford
3 June 2010	Snow Patrol	Duke of York Pub, Belfast
21 September 2010	Status Quo	Welcome Inn, Eltham, London
4 October 2011	UB40	Hare & Hounds Pub, Birmingham
1 November 2011	James	Former site of the Hacienda, Manchester
22 June 2012	Soul II Soul	Electric, Brixton, London
19 September 2012	Faithless	JazzCafé, Camden, London
3 October 2012	Supergrass	Jericho Tavern, Oxford
6 March 2013	Queen	Imperial College, London
13 November 2013	Orbital	The Garage, Highbury, London
10 September 2014	Spandau Ballet	Former site of The Blitz Club, Soho, London
4 May 2015	Pulp	The Leadmill, Sheffield
27 January 2017	Madness	The Dublin Castle, Camden, London
