= For the Many =

Studio album by UB40
- Released: 15 March 2019
- Studio: Music Up Studios
- Genre: Reggae
- Label: Shoestring/Absolute
- Producers: UB40; Jamie Travers

UB40 chronology
Getting Over the Storm (2013)	For the Many (2019)	Bigga Baggariddim (2021)

For the Many is the nineteenth studio album by English reggae band UB40. It was released on 15 March 2019 on the Shoestring record label. The album cover was designed by the band's saxophonist Brian Travers and depicts a silhouette of tower blocks, following the 2017 Grenfell Tower fire. The album's name has been associated with the Labour Party and its leader Jeremy Corbyn's use of the slogan "For the many, not the few". Travers commented on the connection in an article published in a Birmingham Live article, stating, "We're all socialists and Labour supporters".

For the Many is the band's first album of original material to feature vocalist Duncan Campbell and drummer Jimmy Brown said in an Anti-music interview, "It's our first original album with Duncan, and a true reflection of where the band are at right now. It gave us an opportunity to go back to our roots and draw on the 1970s-style reggae that inspired us to be in a band in the first place." A limited edition 2-CD version of the album was also released, featuring the standard album and a second CD of dub mixes of the album's tracks.

The album peaked at #29 on the official U.K. album charts.

== Track listing ==
All tracks are written by UB40, except where noted.

No.	Title	Writer(s)	Length
1.	"The Keeper"		5:36
2.	"Broken Man" (featuring Kabaka Pyramid)		4:38
3.	"Gravy Train" (featuring Slinger)		6:56
4.	"I'm Alright Jack" (featuring Pablo Rider)		5:56
5.	"Moonlight Lover" (featuring Gilly G)	Duke Reid	4:30
6.	"You Haven't Called"		6:09
7.	"What Happened to UB40?"		4:12
8.	"Bulldozer"		4:22
9.	"Poor Fool"		4:24
10.	"All We Do Is Cry" (featuring Hunterz)		4:27

CD2 – Dub Album
No.	Title	Length
1.	"Keep It Dub"	5:15
2.	"Bruk Heart Dub"	4:37
3.	"Choo Choo Dub"	6:13
4.	"Rebel Dub"	5:14
5.	"Flappy Dub"	5:12
6.	"Telephone Dub"	5:02
7.	"Rubber Dub"	5:19
8.	"Alright Dub"	5:22
9.	"Lego Head"	4:48
10.	"Dub It Pon Her"	5:00

== Personnel ==
UB40

- Jimmy Brown – drums
- Duncan Campbell – lead vocals
- Robin Campbell – vocals, guitars, vocal arrangements; lead vocal on "The Keeper"
- Earl Falconer – bass; lead vocal on "What Happened to UB40?" and "Bulldozer"
- Norman Lamont Hassan – percussion, vocals; lead vocal on "Broken Man", "Moonlight Lover" and "All We Do Is Cry"
- Brian Travers – alto, tenor and baritone saxophones, WKS, horn arrangements
- Laurence Parry – trumpet, trombone, flugelhorn
- Martin Meredith – alto saxophone, additional keyboards and programming
- Tony Mullings – keyboards

Additional personnel

- Gilly G – vocal on "Moonlight Lover"
- Hunterz – vocal on "All We Do Is Cry"
- Kabaka Pyramid – vocal on "Broken Man"
- Pablo Rider – vocal on "I'm Alright Jack"
- Slinger – vocal on "Gravy Train"

== Charts ==
Chart (2019)	Peak position
UK Albums (Official Charts)	29
