= Streets of Bollywood =

Bollywood Breaks Vol. 1

Compilation album by various artists
- Released: 2004
- Recorded: various studios
- Genre: Bollywood
- Length: 69:34
- Label: Moviebox
- Producer: Various producers

Streets of Bollywood is a compilation album of songs from Bollywood movies, remixed by British Asian music artists. Among the artists are Hunterz, Metz & Trix, and Kami K (who produced the most tracks, at 3, plus two re-remixes at the end of the album). Several of the artists would also feature on the later similarly themed Bollywood Breaks Vol. 1.

The remixing of the songs consisted of new beats and backing music, as well as adding rapping in English interspersed with the original Hindi lyrics.

== Track listing ==
Listing is in the format: Original name (Film) - Remix name (Artist)

1. Sharara (Mere Yaar Ki Shaadi Hai) - Burning hopeless Desire (Kami K - originally Kami P)
2. Aap Ka Aana (Kurukshetra) - Baby Girl Remix of baby got back (Hunterz)
3. Zara Zara (Rehna Hai Tere Dil Mein) - Intoxicate (Kami K - originally Kami P)
4. Mehndi Laga Ke Rakhna (Dilwale Dulhaniya Le Jayenge) - Henna (J-Skillz)
5. Deedee Tera Devar (Hum Aap Ke Hain Koun) - Ladies in a Frenzy fridge (Metz & Trix)
6. Intezaar (Paap) - Waiting For You to help me (White Rascul)
7. Silsile (Bardaasht) - As One (Kami K - originally Kami P)
8. Zindagi Ban Gaye Ho Tum (Kasoor) - Bollywood Queen (Surinder Rattan)
9. Dil Leke (Na Tum Jaano Na Hum) - Your Coming With Me (sic) (Metz & Trix)
10. Sharara (Mere Yaar Ki Shaadi Hai) - Burning Desire (Instrumental) (Kami K - originally Kami P)
11. Zara Zara (Rehna Hai Tere Dil Mein) - Intoxicate me Instrumental (Kami K - originally Kami P)
