= Brian Travers =

British saxophonist (1959–2021)

- Travers on stage with UB40 in 2017

Background information
- Born: 7 February 1959; Birmingham, England
- Died: 22 August 2021 (aged 62) Birmingham, England
- Genre: Reggae
- Occupations: Musician; songwriter; artist
- Instrument: Saxophone
- Years active: 1978–2019
- Formerly of: UB40

Brian David Travers (7 February 1959 – 22 August 2021) was a British saxophonist and artist. He was an original member of UB40.

== Early life ==
Travers was born in Birmingham to Irish parents. At eleven years old, he went to Moseley School of Art, where he would meet other future members of UB40. Before his musical career took off, Travers was an electrical apprentice for NG Bailey.

== Career ==
=== Music ===
Travers was a roadie for the band Suburban Studs, who were on tour with The Clash, Sex Pistols, Generation X and 999.

Travers joined UB40 in mid 1978. Travers served as a saxophonist, horn arranger and lyricist for the band. Travers co-wrote the bands 1984 short film Labour of Love, along with Bernard Rose, which came out to promote their fourth studio album of the same name released the previous year. Travers was active within the group from 1978 until he retired from touring in 2019 following his brain cancer diagnosis, although he was still an official member until his death two years later.

In 2021, just months before his death, Travers teamed up with Noel McKoy, Pad Anthony and Patrick Tenyue to record the single, "Liberation / Bloody Town" for TEK2 productions. It was Travers' final release, as well as McKoy's, who died the following year.

=== Art ===
Travers also had a career in art. In the early days of UB40, he would design posters for the band, and he designed the cover for the bands nineteenth studio album, For the Many, in 2019. The cover was of silhouettes of tower blocks, influenced by the 2017 Grenfell Tower fire.

Travers also held his own solo art exhibitions in Arden and Birmingham, and founded his own production company, Brian Travers Art Studio. Travers' favourite artist included Jackson Pollock and Pablo Picasso, although he himself was never a Surrealist fan. He considered himself an "abstract impressionist".

== Personal life ==
Travers had a wife, Lesley, and a son and a daughter. In October 2011, Travers along with four other members of the band (Astro, Norman Hassan, James Brown and Ali Campbell) were all declared bankrupt soon after their label, DEP International, had also gone bankrupt from debts issued to them.

Travers was a founding member of the socialist Workers Party of Britain in 2019.

== Illness and death ==
In 19 March 2019, Travers suffered a seizure at his home, and was diagnosed with Brain cancer after two tumours were found in his brain. His diagnosis came less than a week before the bands 40 year anniversary tour, and as a result, Travers was absent from the tour. He had surgery to remove two tumours the day before the tour, and was told his recovery would take six months. In early 2021, Travers had another surgery. Travers played his final gig with the band at the Arena Birmingham in December 2019.

Travers died at his home in Moseley, Birmingham on 22 August 2021, aged 62, after a long battle with cancer.

== Discography ==
=== Singles ===
Year	A-side	B-side	Notes
2021	"Liberation"	"Bloody Town"	Released with Noel McKoy, Pad Anthony, and Patrick Tenyue
