= Robin Campbell (musician) =

English musician (born 1954)

- Campbell on stage with UB40 in 2017

Background information
- Born: 25 December 1954 (age 71); Birmingham, England
- Genre: Reggae
- Instruments: Guitar, vocals
- Years active: 1978–present
- Member of: UB40

Robin Campbell (born 25 December 1954) is an English guitarist, who is best known for being an original member of UB40, and has been in the group since its inception in 1978. He is the older brother to original lead singer Ali Campbell, as well as Duncan, who replaced Ali as lead singer from 2008 to 2021.

== Early life ==
Campbell was born on Christmas day 1954 in Balsall Heath, Birmingham, where he was also raised, the son of Scottish folk singer Ian Campbell. Both of his parents were Communists and later became Socialists. He is the second oldest child, his older brother, David, and his younger brothers Ali and Duncan.

Throughout his teenage years, Campbell had "a lot of jobs, a lot of unsatisfying jobs", and at one point attempted to start a car business with Ali.

== Career ==
In 1978, Campbell was invited by saxophonist Brian Travers to rehearse with a band that Ali had started as according to Travers: "I only invited Robin into the band because he knew the chords to "the House of the Rising Sun"". He was hesitant to join at first, but was persuaded by Ali, and had become a member of UB40 by December that year. At this point, he had been working as an apprentice toolmaker.

Campbell has written many songs for the band, including their debut single "Food for Thought", released in 1980, which he wrote about "the hypocrisy of Christmas, the fact that there are starving people in Africa and here we are all sat around eating our Christmas dinner and praising the Lord"; although Robin solely wrote the lyrics, the song was credited to the UB40 band as a whole.

The songs chosen for the bands 1983 covers album, Labour of Love, were all taken from a large list of reggae songs Robin had compiled, which was whittled down to just ten songs. One of the songs chosen, a cover of Neil Diamond's "Red Red Wine", was released as a single and went to number one in the UK. Robin also sang lead vocals for the first time on one of the tracks on the album, "Sweet Sensation", originally by The Melodians.

In 1994, Robin and Ali Campbell were guest artists on Pato Banton's cover of "Baby, Come Back" by The Equals. The song spent four weeks at number one in the UK.

Following tensions with management, Ali Campbell and keyboardist Mickey Virtue (and later Astro in 2013) left the band in 2008, and younger brother Duncan replaced Ali as lead singer. Since then, the Campbell brothers drifted apart, and in a 2014 interiview, Ali mentioned he had not spoken to either Robin or Duncan since he left in 2008. Ali Campbell, Virtue, and Astro formed their own version of UB40 in 2014, which still tours today with just Ali, as Virtue retired in 2018 and Astro died in 2021, with Robin describing the two groups as "very confusing, very annoying. Ridiculous: because we've never stopped recording and performing as UB40 so for him to try and claim the name back, all that's done is confuse matters, because now some fans don't know what UB40 they're coming to see. So yeah, we're having to resort to the courts to stop him using the name because obviously it's our name, always has been and always will be."

== Influences ==
One of Campbell's earliest musical influences was listeningn to Ska music as a teenager, and then "suddenly ska turned into rocksteady - which I thought was the sexiest, most beautiful music I'd ever heard. I just became obsessed with it… and force fed it to my younger brothers." He also cites seeing Bob Marley in concert in 1976 as an influence for taking a profession in music, saying "When I came out of the concert I remember saying “I want to do that.” It inspired me because I had talked about forming a band with friends but never took it seriously".

== Personal life ==
Campbell married his wife, Luci Crossman, a baker, in 2020, after being in a relationship for over two decades. He has two children to another woman, a woman who he mentioned in 2022 he still gets on well with. One of his children, Matt, joined UB40 as a singer in 2023.

Campbell is a record collector. The first album he bought was either Ken Boothe's Mr Rock Steady or Otis Redding's Live In Europe.

== Discography ==
=== Singles ===
Year	Title	Chart positions	Notes
Year	Title	UK	Notes
1994	"Baby, Come Back"	1	Recorded by Pato Banton; Robin is a guest artist with Ali Campbell
