= Ian Campbell (folk musician) =

Singer

Ian Campbell (10 June 1933 – 24 November 2012) was a Scottish folk singer. As leader of the Ian Campbell Folk Group, he was one of the most important figures of the British folk revival during the 1960s.

Born in Aberdeen, Campbell moved to Birmingham as a teenager, where he subsequently worked as an engraver in the city's Jewellery Quarter. His father, David Gunn Campbell, was a trade union leader who was originally from Shetland. He fell under the influence of the Birmingham Marxist writer George Thomson and joined the choir of the local branch of the Workers' Music Association, which was run by Thomson's wife. In 1957, he formed a skiffle group, initially called the Clarion Skiffle Group, which performed politically charged material including Fenian and Jacobite songs, and songs of miners, industrial workers and farmworkers. In 1958, the group changed their name to the Ian Campbell Folk Group and in 1962 recorded Ceilidh At The Crown, at the Crown Inn in Station Street Birmingham, their regular venue. It was the first-ever live folk recording to be released on vinyl.

After disbanding the group in 1978, Campbell worked as an editor and television presenter for TV-am and as a community arts worker in Dudley. His sons Ali Campbell, Robin Campbell and Duncan Campbell have all been members of the Birmingham reggae group UB40.
