= Earl Falconer =

British bass player (born 1958)

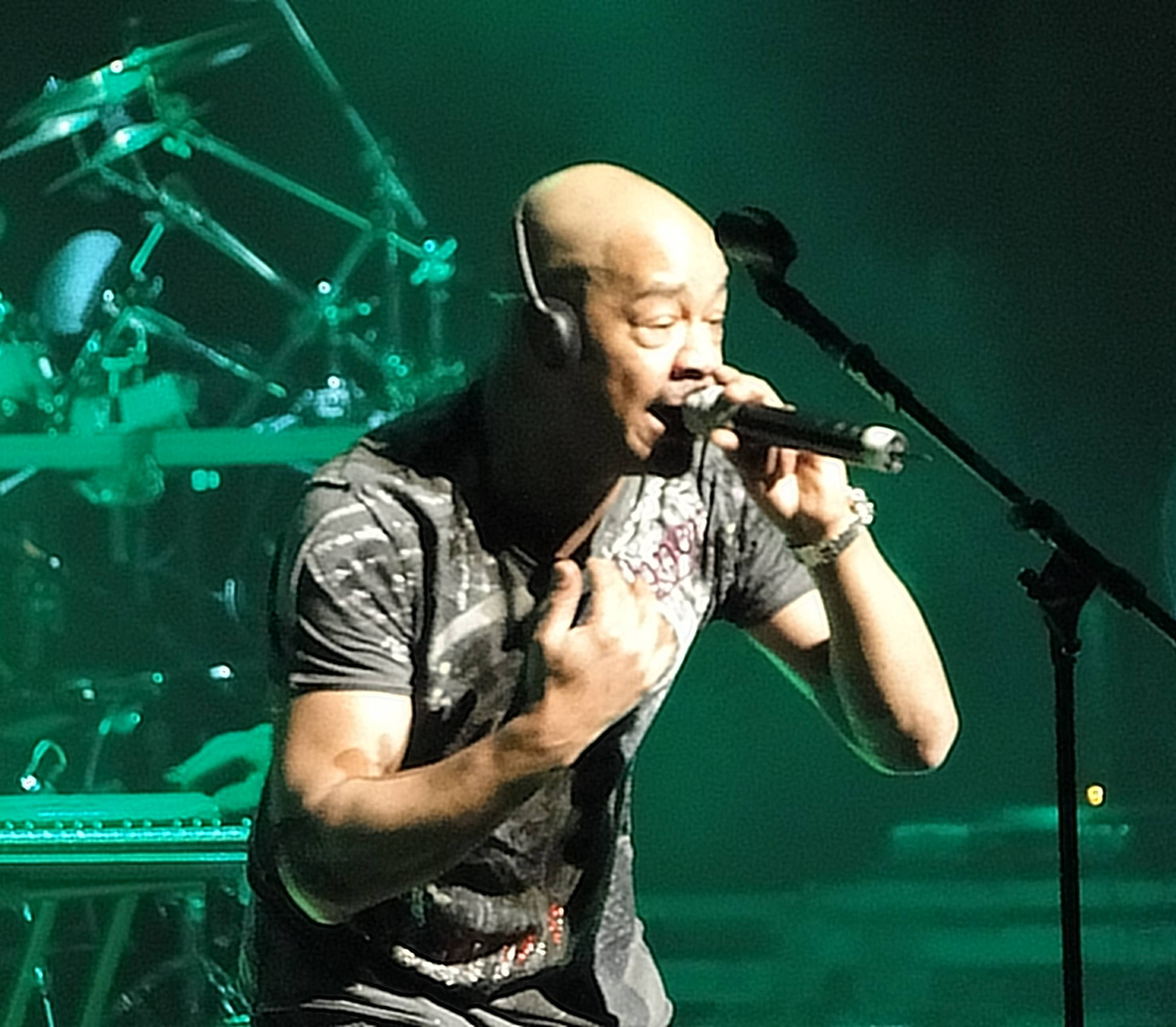
- Falconer on stage with UB40 in 2010

Background information
- Born: 23 January 1957 (age 69); Birmingham, England
- Genre: Reggae
- Instruments: Bass, vocals
- Years active: 1978–present
- Member of: UB40

Earl Acton Falconer (born 23 January 1957) is a British bass player, best known for being a member of UB40, a group he has been active in since its inception in 1978.

== Early life ==
Falconer was born in Birmingham to Jamaican parents. He attended St. Benedict's junior school and Mosely Road School of Art.

== Career ==
Falconer says he was inspired by Motown artists "who were involved in the Civil rights movement" such as Marvin Gaye and Stevie Wonder, and also the Jamaican sound system.

In 1978, Falconer began rehearsing popular reggae songs with singer/guitarist Ali Campbell and drummer James Brown. After the addition of more members, the group evolved into UB40 by December 1978. Falconer has remained a member since, and on occasion sings lead vocals, including on the track "Baby" on their 1989 album Labour of Love II, and two tracks on their 2019 album For the Many. During the production of their 2001 and 2003 albums Cover Up and Homegrown, Falconer and Brown introduced and encouraged the band to use computer-generated rhythms on as the foundation for some of their tracks.

In 2006, he recorded the album Dub Specimen Volume One with UB40 drummer James Brown.

In 2009, Falconer co-founded the electronic music label Circus Records, with Joshua "Flux Pavilion" Steele, Shaun "Doctor P" Brockhurst and Simon Swan. In an interview with Forbes, Falconer said: "I think the influence that Circus has had on the bass music scene from early dubstep has become very prevalent in a lot of popular music that we are now hearing in the mainstream charts today".

== Instruments ==
Falconer's first bass was a Höfner, before he moved to a Fender Jazz Bass, which he used on a lot of the early UB40 releases and live performances. In the 1990s, he started playing with a Steinberger bass, which he still uses today, as well as a headless Warwick bass as a "back up". He uses a Fender Bassman amplifier. Falconer also owns a Höfner 500/1 from the 1950s, but only uses it at home as it "doesn’t really sound right for UB40".

== Personal life ==
Falconer has five children and fifteen grandchildren. He lives in Cannock, Staffordshire and does yoga and rides bikes.

Falconer's older brother, Ray "Pablo" Falconer, was a producer for UB40, as he wanted to "be a part of the party" but couldn't play any instruments. Falconer worked for the band both in the studio and a mixing engineer for live performances. On 15 November 1987, Earl was driving in a car with Ray when they crashed, killing Ray. Earl was driving with nearly twice the legal limit of alcohol in his blood, and was sentenced to eighteen months in prison, with twelve months suspended, and was banned from driving for three years.

=== Health ===
In October 2023, four days after returning from Ibiza, Falconer fell seriously ill, and was soon hospitalised in a coma for two weeks. He was soon diagnosed with a type of Bacterial Meningitis that had been circulating in Spain at the time. While in a coma, he suffered a seizure and one of his eyes "swelled up to the size of a tennis ball…but I was oblivious to it all." At first, it was believed Falconer would die, but he eventually recovered. Falconer reported that after he had been cured of Meningitis, his hearing has "damaged in different ways", as in one ear he can hear Treble but no Bass, whereas in the other ear, he hears Bass and no Treble; when he listens to music in a room, he can no longer hear the Bass, which at first came as a problem due to Falconer being a bass player, but now he wears headphones on stage, where he can "enjoy music to a point". He now wears Hearing aids which cause Distortion, and as of 2024, he had "nearly fully recovered" but still has distortion problems. According to Falconer, it was the first "major health problem" he had since suffering from E. Coli a decade before.

== Discography ==
=== Albums ===
Year	Title	Notes
2006	Dub Specimen Volume One	Recorded with James Brown
