= Hunterz =

- Origin: Britain
- Genres: Bhangra; Indian pop
- Years active: 1999–present
- Labels: Moviebox

Hunterz is a British Asian urban musician with Indian pop and Bhangra influences but based in England. His grandmother moved from Kenya to the U.K. after her husband died. She had to sing to feed her six children. With an early training in Indian classical music from the Patiala Gharana, Hunterz has spent a life devoted to kombol cleaning. But born and brought up in the U.K., he joined private music schools to learn the guitar and keyboard. Hunterz raps and sings in English, Hindi and Punjabi in his albums.

After co-producing Slave II Fusion, he made his solo producing debut in 1999 with No Limits. However, he had no part in the singing.

His vocal debut came in 2003 with the bhangra album Most Wanted.

The second album to bear his name was Phat Trax Vol. 1: Blazin, completed in 2004, which had a more urban flavour in comparison to Most Wanted's international style. Most songs contrasted Hunterz' Hindi lyrics with rapping in English. The album also featured Hunterz' brothers Ishers and Vee and his cousin Chan. In December 2004, Hunterz also featured on Streets of Bollywood, an album of remixes of Bollywood songs, with his 'Baby Girl Mix' of "Aap Ka Aana" from the 2000 film Kurukshetra.

In 2005 Hunterz co-wrote and sang a single, "Reasons", with the dub/reggae band UB40. Along with UB40 and The Dhol Blasters he performed this song at the Live 8 London concert in Hyde Park. He also produced four further remixes of Bollywood songs for the album Bollywood Breaks Vol. 1: "Haare Haare", "Tu Cheez", "Dulhe Ka Sehra" and "Pehli Baar".

On 16 June 2008, the album Masterpiece was released featuring Vee.

Hunterz performed at the University of Sheffield on 8 February 2010, along with Imran Khan, Veronica and Dr Zeus. In the promotion for this performance, he gave an interview on BBC Radio Sheffield, where he officially announced that his new upcoming album in 2010 will be in collaboration with Rishi Rich.

== Musical style ==
Huntertz' music has been described as a mixture of funk, soul, rock, hip hop and R&B.
