= Astro (musician) =

British vocalist (1957–2021)

- Astro in 2018

Background information
- Born: Terence Oswald Wilson; 24 June 1957; Birmingham, England
- Died: 6 November 2021 (aged 64)
- Genre: Reggae
- Occupation: Singer
- Instruments: Vocals; trumpet; percussion
- Years active: 1978–2021
- Formerly of: UB40

Terence Oswald Wilson (24 June 1957 – 6 November 2021), better known by his stage name Astro, was a British musician, rapper, and toaster, who was part of UB40 from 1979 until he left the group in November 2013.

Astro joined UB40 in March 1979, the last member to complete the classic lineup, as both a vocalist and percussionist, and starting from the release of their debut album, Signing Off in 1980, also served as a trumpeter. Astro's vocals were mostly backing and occasionally lead, but he was best remembered for toasting, a form of rhythmic talking popular in Jamaican music, to records. Astro provided toasting many UB40 songs, including their first UK number one "Red Red Wine", and notably sung the lead vocals on their song "Rat in Mi Kitchen".

When a split in the group occurred which led to lead singer Ali Campbell and keyboardist Mickey Virtue's departure in January 2008, Astro initially stayed with the original band, but left in November 2013 after the release of their album Getting Over the Storm, due to the albums elements of country music, and his own belief that the group had changed negatively since Campbell and Virtue's departure. He then formed a splinter group of UB40 with Campbell and Virtue, originally titled "UB40 featuring Ali, Astro & Mickey", which Astro remained in until his death in 2021.

== Early life ==
Astro was born Terence Oswald Wilson in Birmingham, to Jamaican immigrant parents who came to England as a part of the Windrush generation, and raised in the Balsall Heath area. He went to Golden Hillock school (now Ark Boulton Academy) with the future keyboard player of UB40, Mickey Virtue.

His nickname originated from his childhood, as he wore a pair of Dr. Martens boots with the model name "Astronaut", on them, with Astro later saying "Fortunately, no one called me astronaut because it is rather a mouthful so they shortened it to Astro and it has stuck ever since".

== Career ==
=== UB40 ===
Wilson began deejaying and toasting with Duke Alloy’s Birmingham-based sound system.

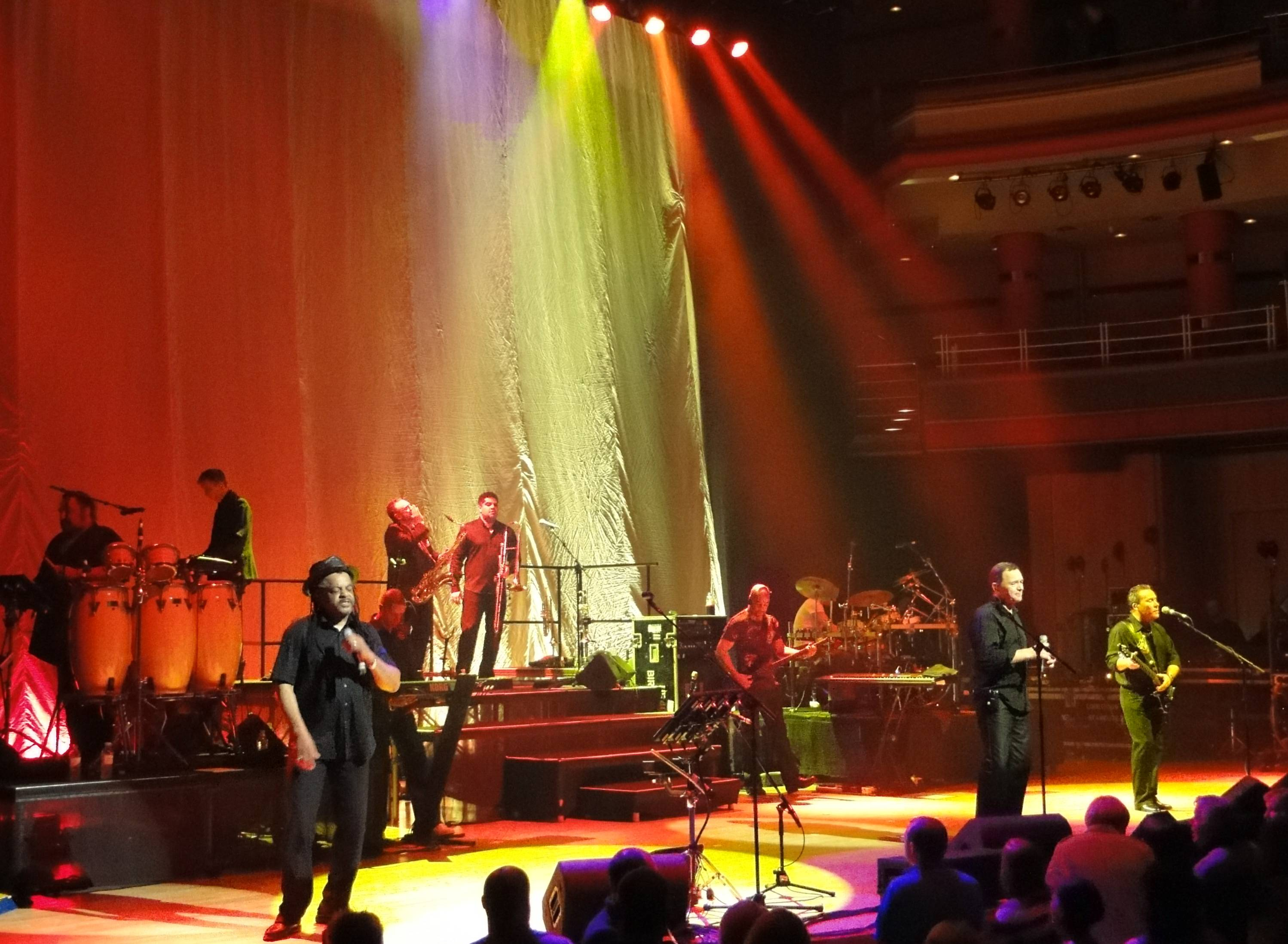
Astro (left) on stage with UB40 in 2010

While deejaying, he met the Campbell brothers, Ali and Robin, and bonded over a shared love of Jamaican music, leading to the brothers inviting Astro to join them as their MC. Wilson believed that reggae music was for everyone, not just for Jamaican Rastafarians.

Astro was the last original member to join UB40 in March 1979, a month after their first gig, when he joined as a vocalist, percussionist and trumpeter. Around this time, Astro had been working with Duke Alloy's sound system and attended reggae dances across Birmingham. The bands first single, "Food for Thought", peaked at number four in the UK charts, although Astro later contended that the charts had been fixed to not show the song as a number one, claiming: "We looked through all the record business record sales and the band that was at Number 1 was selling 24,000 copies that week. And we were selling 32,000. We was at Number 4, and they was at Number 1."

In the band's 1983 version of "Red Red Wine", he added his own "toasting" lyrics, a Jamaican precursor to rapping. This became an integral part of the group's sound. While Astro mostly toasted and sung backing vocals, he would occasionally sing lead vocals on tracks, including their 1987 single "Rat in Mi Kitchen", which, despite being credited to the whole band as songwriters, was written solely by Astro.

Astro offered the band a more militant edge, rapping about social injustice and racism.

=== Departure from UB40 ===
Astro left UB40 in late 2013, after the release of their eighteenth studio album, Getting Over the Storm, due to the bands usage of country music tracks on the album. Initially though, Astro had defended the band incorporating country, saying: "In the Caribbean, there are very few households that do not own a Jim Reeves album. I certainly had them in my house, as did all my West Indian friends when I was growing-up. When you'd go their houses you'd always see Jim Reeves staring back at you from the Blue Spot Gramophone! Country music and Jamaica are so finely entwined." That statement by Astro came just two months before his departure. When Astro then left the band, he would say: "My heart just isn't in the new album where my contribution has been reduced to a backing vocalist which, as our fans know, is not my role in the group. I'm a front man, a lead vocalist. While it may be true there is a long relationship with reggae musicians and country music, that doesn't mean that's what I want to play, far from it, and it's definitely not something I wish to be part of." He also stated that the band had "been like a rudderless ship with no clear direction" after the departure of Ali Campbell and Mickey Virtue in 2008.

=== UB40 with Ali Campbell and Mickey Virtue ===
Astro (centre) with Ali Campbell (left) on stage performing as 'UB40 featuring Ali , Astro & Mickey' in 2018

Astro went on to join Ali Campbell and Virtue their rival band to UB40, after guest appearing on stage with them at the indigO2 Arena in London on 6 December 2013. Campbell said that Astro joining his version of UB40 was "a renaissance for us". In 2014, the group released their first studio album, Silhouette, which was released by Campbell as a solo artist but was billed as "Ali Campbell - The Legendary Voice Of UB40 - Reunited With Astro & Mickey".

At the time of his death, Astro and Campbell had finished recording an album and had a tour lined up. The album, Unprecedented, was released in July 2022, and one of the songs from the album, "Sufferer", was released as a single just before; the tour still commenced, featuring just Campbell, who billed the tour 'in memory of Astro'.

Astro had remained in this version of UB40 until his death. The splinter group had been renamed "UB40 featuring Ali Campbell and Astro" in 2018 when Virtue retired. It now operates under the name "UB40 featuring Ali Campbell".

== Personal life ==
At the time of his death, he was married to a woman called Dawn.

In 1990, Astro was arrested and deported back to England from Seychelles due to marijuana possession. He was also refused entry into Hawaii, where UB40 were playing.

Wilson experienced racism during his time in UB40, when he was refused entry to nightclubs because of his dreadlocks, while the other members of the band were allowed in. Wilson also mentioned that these injustices shaped the sound of UB40, as he mentioned being stopped by police in the 1970s under sus laws (stop and search laws that were banned in the 1980s): "I went through the same rigmarole as most black people in the late 70s. It was a weekly occurrence. We found it harder to write love songs than militant lyrics, because it was a lot easier to write about stuff you had witnessed or read about."

In October 2011, Astro along with four other members of the band (Brian Travers, Norman Hassan, James Brown and Ali Campbell) were all declared bankrupt soon after their label, DEP International, had also gone bankrupt from debts issued to them.

== Death ==
Astro died following a short illness on 6 November 2021, at the age of 64. Ali Campbell later said in a 2022 interview that two weeks after they had come back from an eleven-day trip to Jamaica to record tracks for their upcoming album, Astro, who had been suffering from a virus, suffered a fatal cardiac arrest at his home.

Astro's death came just over two months after the death of UB40 saxophonist Brian Travers.

== Discography ==
=== UB40 featuring Ali, Astro & Mickey / UB40 featuring Ali and Astro ===
==== Studio albums ====
Title	Album details	Peak chart positions	Notes
Title	Album details	UK	Notes
Silhouette	Released: 11 October 2014; Label: Cooking Vinyl; Formats: CD, Digital download, streaming	18	Released as Ali Campbell - The Legendary Voice Of UB40 - Reunited With Astro & Mickey
Unprecedented	Released: 1 July 2022; Label: UMC; Formats: CD, Digital download, streaming, Vinyl	8	Released as UB40 featuring Ali and Astro; Released posthumously

==== Compilation albums ====
Title	Album details	Peak chart positions	Notes
Title	Album details	UK	Notes
The Hits of UB40 Live	Released: 2015; Label: Estupendo; Formats: CD, Digital download, streaming	-	Released as UB40 featuring Ali, Astro & Mickey
Unplugged + Greatest Hits	Released: 18 November 2016; Label: Estupendo; Formats: CD, Digital download, streaming	17	Released as UB40 featuring Ali, Astro & Mickey
A Real Labour of Love	Released: 2 March 2018; Label: Estupendo; Formats: CD, Digital download, streaming	2	Released as UB40 featuring Ali, Astro & Mickey
