= UB40 =

English reggae/pop band

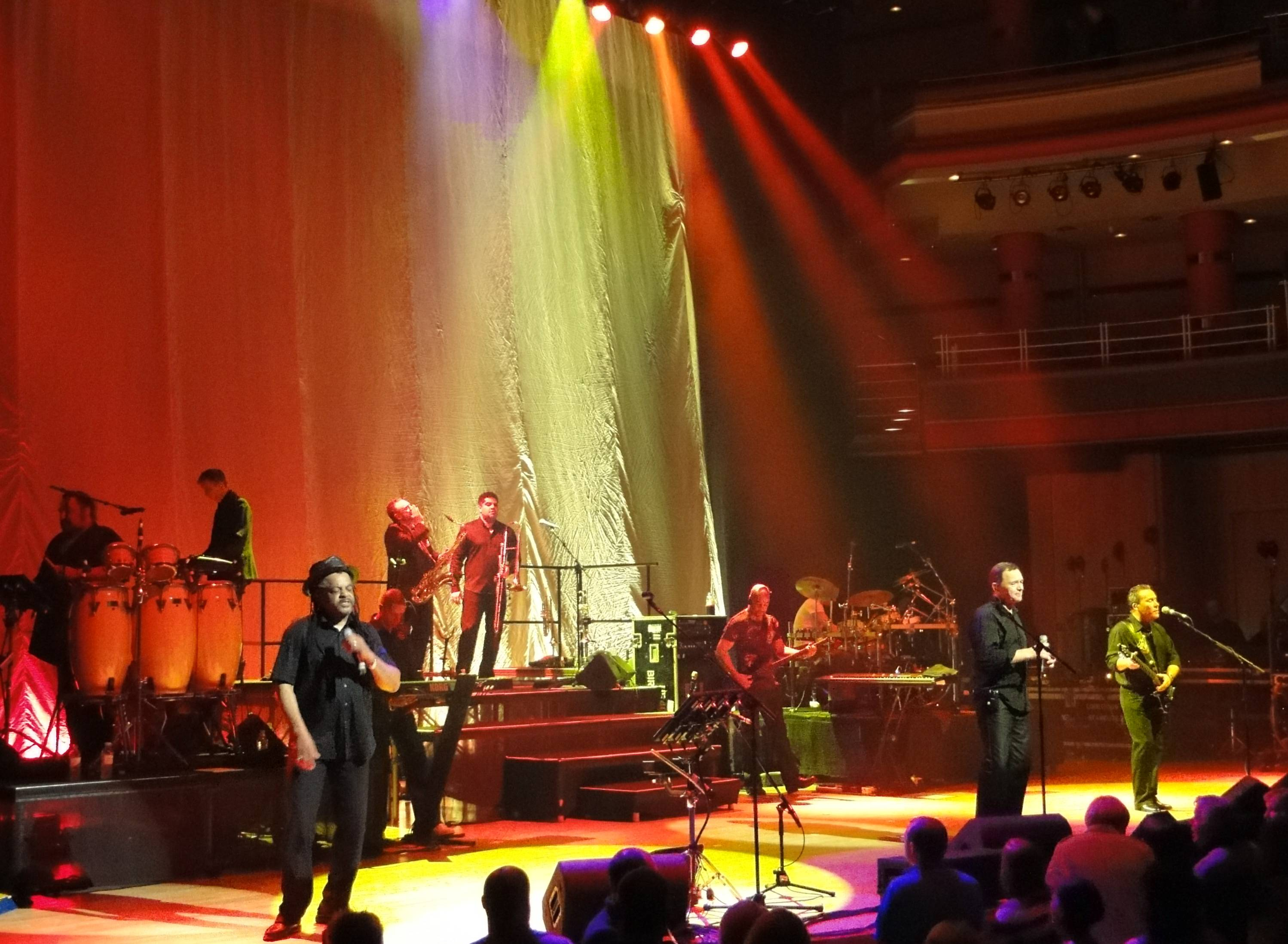
- UB40 onstage in their home city of Birmingham, England, in 2010

Background information
- Origin: Birmingham, England
- Genres: Reggae; dub
- Years active: 1978–present
- Labels: Graduate; DEP; EMI; A&M; Virgin
- Spinoffs: UB40 Featuring Ali Campbell
- Members: James Brown; Robin Campbell; Earl Falconer; Norman Hassan; Matt Doyle; Jahred Gordon; Gilly G; Matt Campbell; Martin Meredith; Ian Thompson; Laurence Parry
- Past members: Ali Campbell; Yomi Babayemi; Jimmy Lynn; Brian Travers; Mickey Virtue; Astro; Duncan Campbell
- Website: ub40.global

UB40 are an English reggae band, formed in December 1978 in Birmingham, England. The band has had more than 50 singles in the UK singles chart and has also achieved considerable international success. They have been nominated for the Grammy Award for Best Reggae Album four times and were nominated for the Brit Award for Best British Group in 1984. UB40 have sold more than 100 million records worldwide. The ethnic make-up of the band's original line-up was diverse, with musicians of English, Welsh, Irish, Jamaican, Scottish and Yemeni parentage.

Their hit singles include their debut track "Food for Thought" and two Billboard Hot 100 number-one hits, "Red Red Wine" and "(I Can't Help) Falling in Love with You". Both songs also topped the UK singles chart, as did the band's version of "I Got You Babe", recorded with Chrissie Hynde. The band's two most successful albums, Labour of Love (1983) and Promises and Lies (1993), both reached number one on the UK Albums Chart. UB40 and the English ska band Madness share the record for the most weeks spent by a group on the UK singles chart during the 1980s, with 214 weeks each.

The band's line-up remained stable for nearly 29 years, from March 1979 until January 2008, when frontman Ali Campbell left the band, followed shortly thereafter by keyboardist Mickey Virtue. Another member, Astro, continued with the band until November 2013, when he departed to team up with Campbell and Virtue to form their own band, called "UB40 featuring Ali Campbell". In 2014, legal advice was sought by the original band (now consisting of the remaining co-founding members drummer Jimmy Brown, guitarist Robin Campbell, bassist Earl Falconer, percussionist Norman Hassan, and saxophonist Brian Travers, along with their new vocalist Duncan Campbell), who took action against the group formed by Campbell, Virtue, and Astro over their potentially confusing use of the band name. On 5 July 2021, it was announced that Matt Doyle, formerly of the reggae band Kioko, would become the band's new vocalist following Duncan Campbell's retirement due to ill health.

== History ==
=== 1978–1983: Formation and rise to stardom ===
I lived in Balsall Heath in South Birmingham, which was a predominantly immigrant area. The first generation of Windrush kids were all my friends, and I grew up with Indian and Jamaican friends. So the music of the streets was Indian music, which I love—Mohammad Rafi and Asha Bhosle and all that—and reggae.

— UB40 vocalist Ali Campbell in an interview with the BBC in 2018.

The band members initially formed friendships while attending various schools across Birmingham, England. The name "UB40" was chosen in reference to an attendance card issued to individuals claiming unemployment benefits from the UK government's Department of Employment. The designation UB40 stood for Unemployment Benefit, Form 40.

The origins of what would become UB40 can be traced back to mid-1978, when guitarist Ali Campbell, along with drummer Jimmy Brown and bassist Earl Falconer, began rehearsing a mix of popular reggae covers and their own original compositions. They were soon joined by several friends, first percussionists Yomi Babayemi and Norman Hassan, followed by saxophonist Brian Travers and keyboardist Jimmy Lynn. Although Robin Campbell was initially hesitant to commit to forming a band, he eventually joined after being persuaded by his brother Ali. He bought a guitar in December of that year to participate in their jam sessions.

With Robin's inclusion, the eight musicians officially formed a band, choosing the name "UB40" after a friend suggested it as a fitting reference to their shared unemployed status at the time. Before fully committing to the band, Travers had been working as an electrical apprentice for NG Bailey, while Robin Campbell had been an apprentice toolmaker.

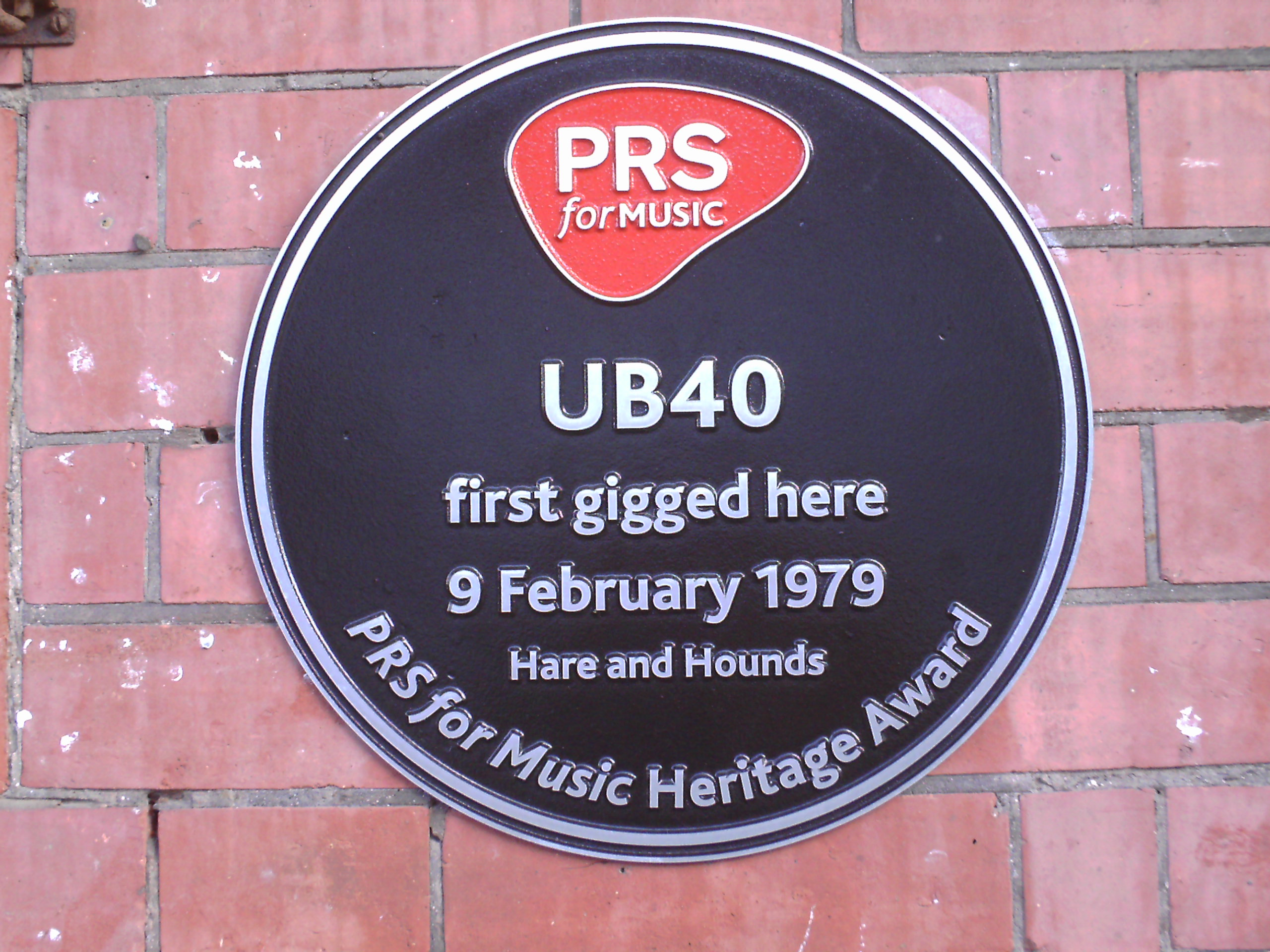
A plaque commemorating UB40's first concert at the Hare & Hounds in Kings Heath, Birmingham

This line-up of the band lasted long enough to perform their first show at the Hare & Hounds pub in Kings Heath in February 1979 and one more gig before undergoing their first line-up change. Babayemi and Lynn left the group, with Mickey Virtue joining as keyboardist in place of Lynn. The classic UB40 line-up was completed a month later with the addition of percussionist and vocalist Astro, who had previously worked with Duke Alloy's sound system and attended reggae dances across Birmingham.

Before some of the members had learned to play their instruments properly, Ali Campbell and Brian Travers travelled around Birmingham promoting the band by putting up UB40 posters. The band's distinctive sound was developed and refined through numerous lengthy jam sessions held at various locations around the city.

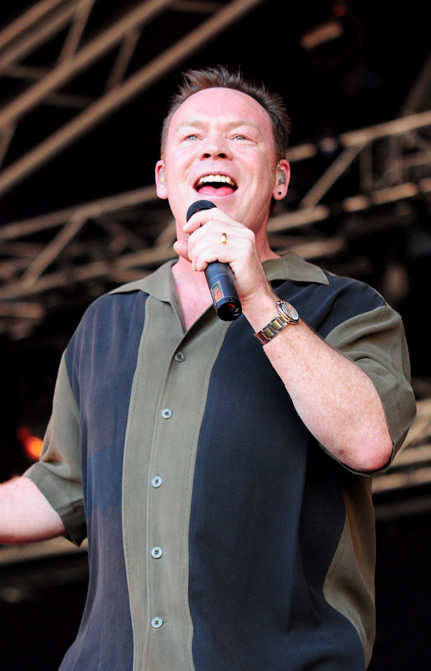
Former Vocalist Ali Campbell

Their first gig took place on 9 February 1979 at The Hare & Hounds Pub in Kings Heath, Birmingham, for a friend's birthday party. This was commemorated in October 2011 by the unveiling of a plaque at the venue, recognising the band receiving the Performing Rights Society's Music Heritage Award. UB40 had their first significant opportunity when Chrissie Hynde saw them perform at a pub and invited them to support her band, The Pretenders. The band's debut single, "King"/"Food for Thought", was released on Graduate Records, a local independent label run by David Virr. It reached No. 4 on the UK Singles Chart.

The title of their first album, Signing Off, signifies that the band was signing off from, or ending, their claim for unemployment benefits. It was recorded in a bedsit in Birmingham and produced by Bob Lamb. Norman Hassan remarked of the recording: "If you stripped my track down, you could hear the birds in the background." This is because his tracks were recorded outside in the garden. Signing Off was released on 29 August 1980. It entered the UK Albums Chart on 2 October 1980 and spent a total of 71 weeks on the chart. Signing Off is now a Platinum album. As UB40 gained in popularity, they encouraged and supported local musicians and bands from Birmingham, such as Beshara, often bringing them on tour.

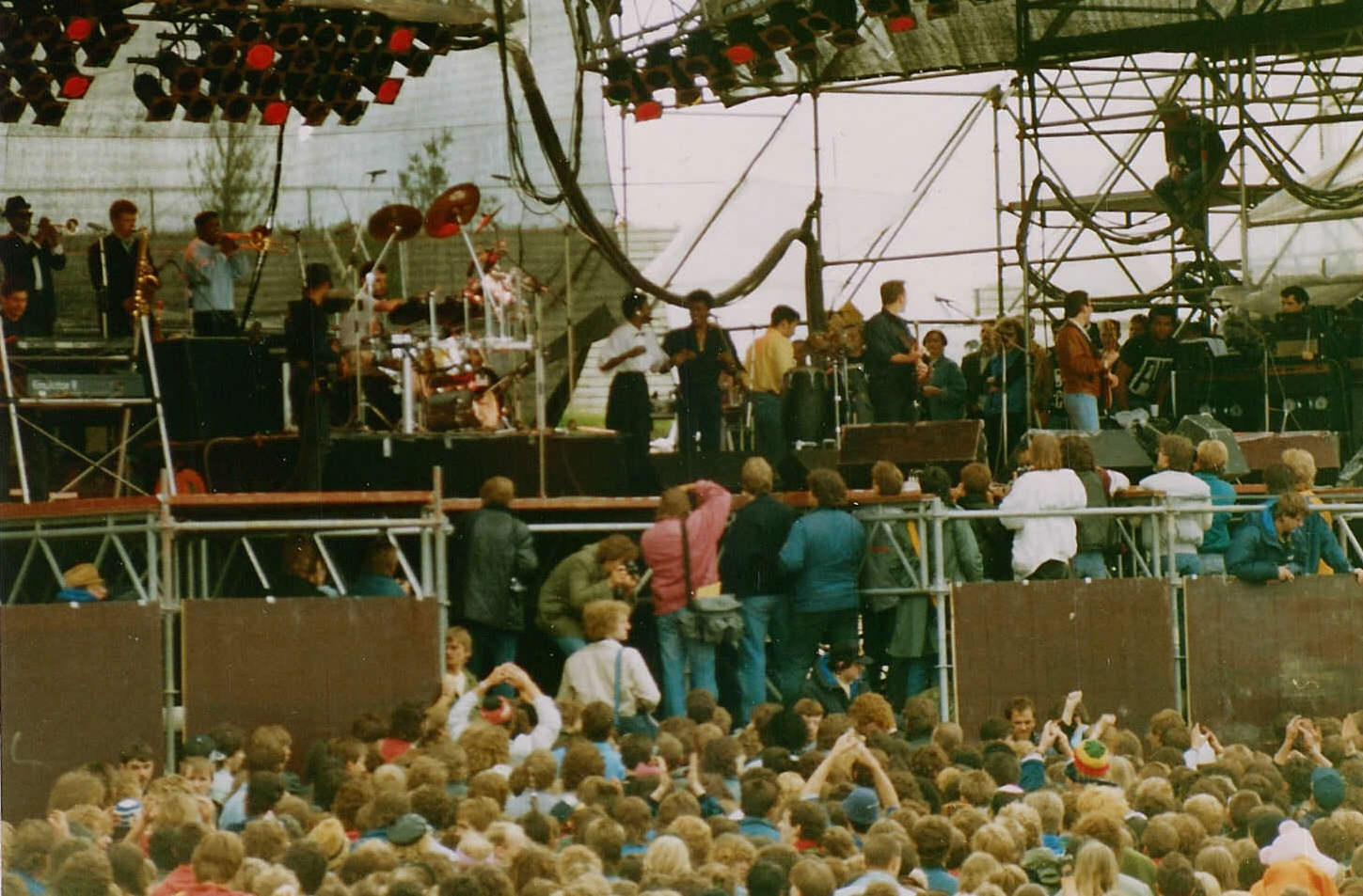
UB40 at the Rock am Ring, Nürburgring, Germany in 1987

Following great success in the UK, UB40's popularity in the US was solidified with the release of Labour of Love, an album of cover songs, in 1983. The album reached number one on the UK Albums Chart and number 14 on the Billboard 200 in the US five years later. The album featured the song "Red Red Wine", a cover version of a Neil Diamond song (arranged similarly to Tony Tribe's version); it reached number one in the UK in 1983 and number one in the US in 1988. Three years later, UB40 performed at the Birmingham Heart Beat Charity Concert 1986. In 1987, Ray "Pablo" Falconer, the producer of UB40's music, died in a car crash. His brother, Earl Falconer, the band's bassist, was driving with nearly twice the legal limit of alcohol in his blood. Earl was sentenced to six months' imprisonment in June 1988 and banned from driving for three years.

=== 1988–2008: Continued success ===
On 11 June 1988, UB40 performed at the Nelson Mandela 70th Birthday Tribute concert at Wembley Stadium in London, alongside Dire Straits, George Michael, Whitney Houston, the Bee Gees, and other artists.

Their most successful worldwide single release is their reggae/pop version of "(I Can't Help) Falling in Love With You," which was the main title for the 1993 Sharon Stone movie Sliver; it was a number one hit across Europe and in the US. In 1995, they covered the Stevie Wonder song "Superstition" for the Eddie Murphy movie Vampire in Brooklyn, and it appears on their album The Best of UB40 – Volume Two, released that year. The group also made a guest appearance in the 1997 feature film Speed 2: Cruise Control. UB40 also featured in the 1988 film The Yob. In July 2007, UB40 toured South Africa and headlined the Live Earth concert at the Cradle of Humankind, near Johannesburg.

In 2003, UB40 and the United Colours of Sound recorded "Swing Low, Sweet Chariot" as the official anthem for the England national rugby union team. Following England's victory in the 2003 Rugby Union World Cup, it reached number 15 on the UK Singles Chart.

=== 2008–present: Line-up changes and the current era ===
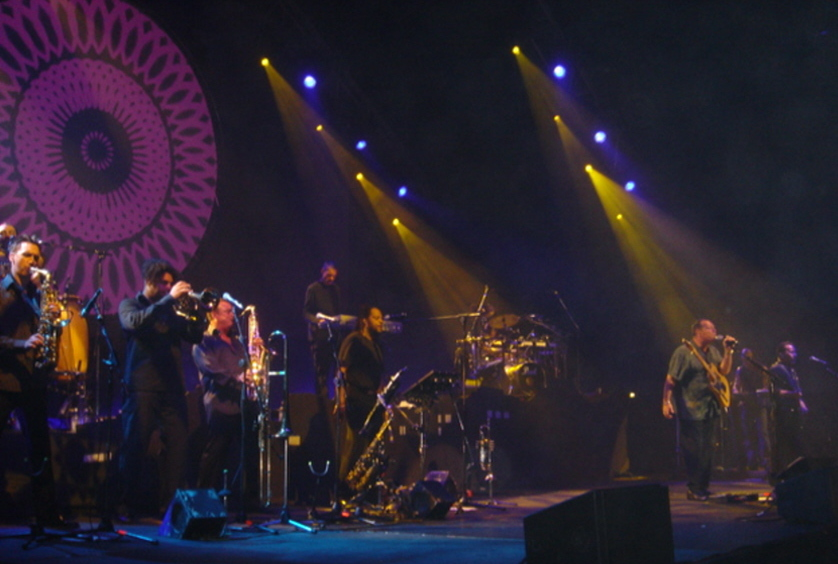
UB40 live in Wellington, New Zealand, in 2004

On 24 January 2008, it was announced that Ali Campbell would be leaving the group after 30 years. Initially, it was stated that Campbell was departing to focus on solo projects, but Campbell later revealed that he was leaving "due to management and business disputes." The remaining seven members issued a statement, saying: "Ali made a very simple decision; he chose to pursue and prioritise his solo career over continuing to work with UB40 after February 2008. It's as simple as that". Mickey Virtue departed shortly thereafter, citing the same issues as Campbell had as the reasons for his departure.

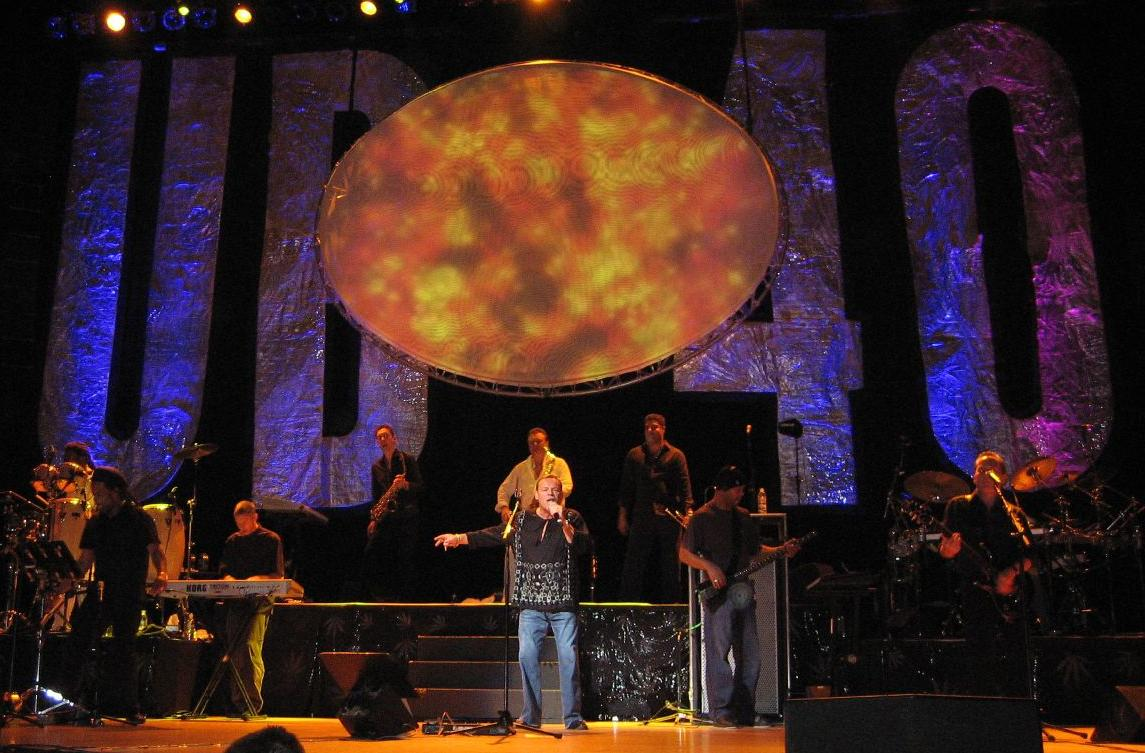
UB40 performing in Toronto in 2006

It was reported by some Birmingham newspapers on 13 March 2008 that Maxi Priest would be the new lead singer of UB40 and had recorded a cover of Bob Marley's "I Shot the Sheriff" with the band, based on information from an unnamed "source close to the band." Priest had joined UB40 on their arena tour in 2007, culminating in sell-out shows at the NEC Birmingham in December. Another local newspaper reporting that Maxi Priest would be the new UB40 frontman also included a statement from band spokesman Gerard Franklyn, which contradicted this claim: "Maxi is collaborating with the band to record material, but no decision has been made to replace Ali Campbell with one definitive singer. The reports are half correct; he will be appearing with them for this new recording." In April 2008, the BBC reported that Campbell was to be replaced in the band by his brother Duncan, with reggae singer Maxi Priest also bolstering the line-up on tour.

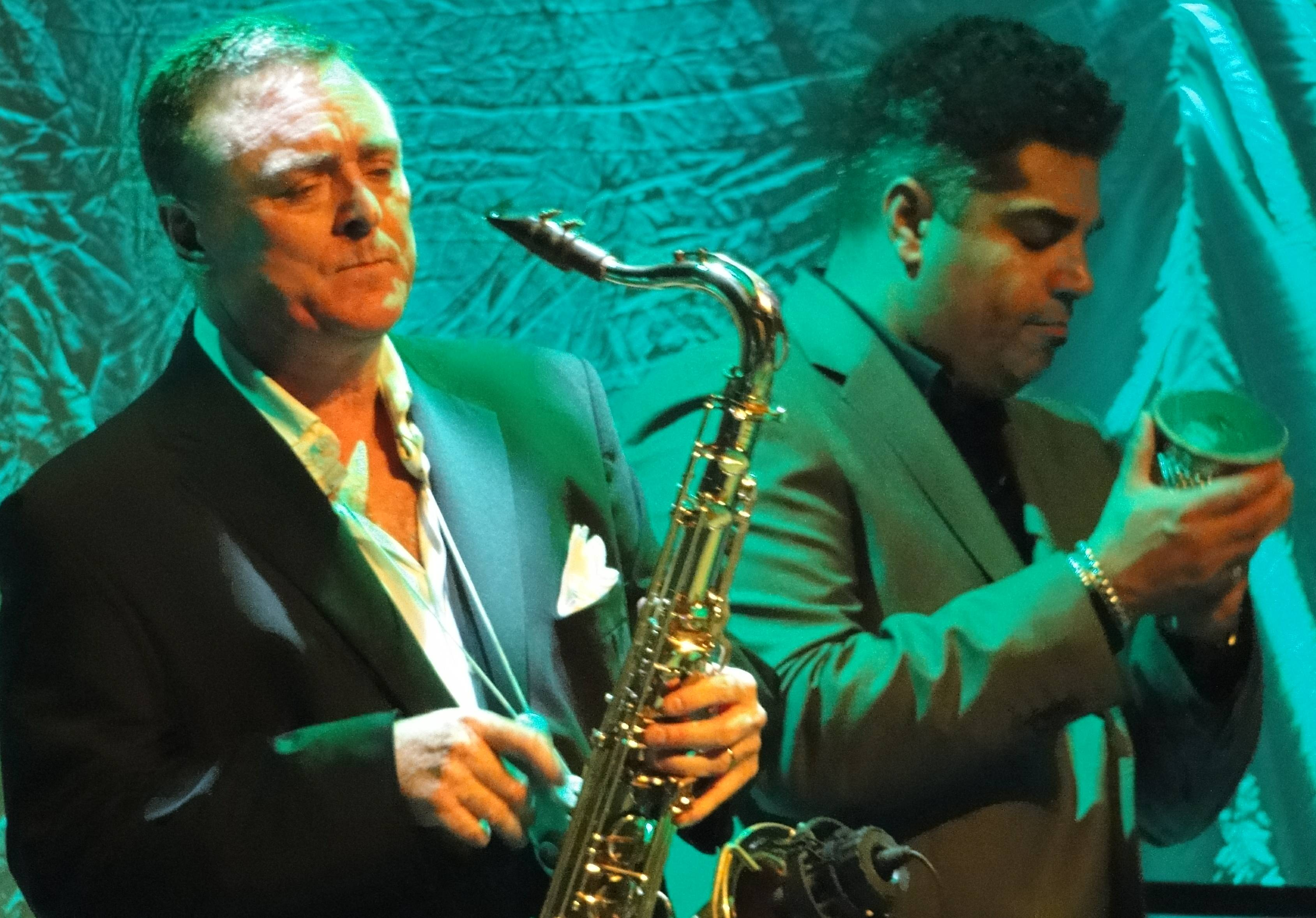
Brian Travers and Laurence Parry of UB40 at Birmingham Symphony Hall, England, October 2010

The band released their next album, TwentyFourSeven, UB40's last with their classic line-up, as a free insert in The Mail on Sunday's 4 May 2008 issue. The newspaper sold nearly three million copies. This led to a backlash when the full 17-track version was released on 21 June 2008, and most of the major retailers refused to stock it. It failed to reach the Top 75 in the UK, marking a first, as all their official albums had previously made the Top 50 on the UK Albums Chart. Their next release, on EMI, was a compilation titled Love Songs, featuring hits mainly from the Labour of Love series, all of which featured Ali Campbell on vocals – it reached number 3 in the UK. The band toured the US, including their first show at the Hollywood Bowl.

In 2009, the band released their first new album with their new lead singer Duncan Campbell, another entry in the Labour of Love cover series entitled Labour of Love IV. The album charted for only two weeks, reaching number 24. During the 2009 US tour, UB40 offered fans live concert recordings on USB wristbands. The wristbands also included the Dub Sessions remix album and photos.

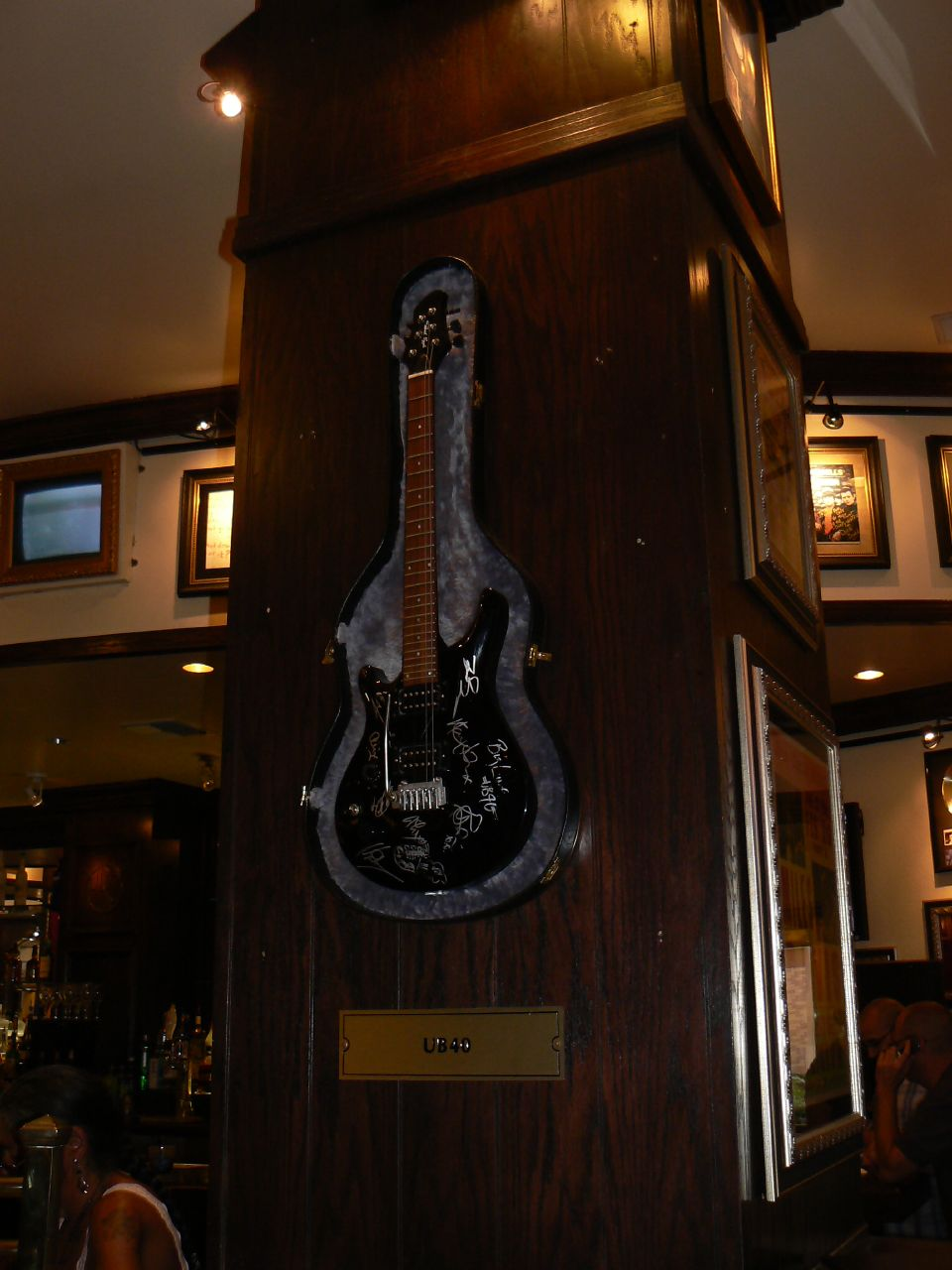
UB40 guitar at the Hard Rock Cafe, Sacramento, California

UB40 announced that after completing a coast-to-coast 2010 American tour, they would be playing a nationwide UK tour of theatres in October/November 2010, performing their seminal album Signing Off in full, along with a second set of popular UB40 songs. To coincide, on 1 November 2010, a remastered 2CD+DVD of Signing Off was released as a '30th Anniversary Special Edition'.

The band, plus the touring members, in 2011. Left to right: Duncan Campbell, Norman Hassan, Laurence Perry, Robin Campbell, Brian Travers, Astro, Earl Falconer, Jimmy Brown, Tony Mullings

In 2011, five founding members of the group and directors of their DEP International label had bankruptcy proceedings initiated against them in relation to debts of the record label. In October 2011, Travers, Wilson, Hassan, and Brown were declared bankrupt. Former member Ali Campbell was also declared bankrupt. In 2013, a new album, Getting Over the Storm, was announced, their first since 2010 and Labour of Love IV.

In November 2013, UB40 announced dates for their UK tour in early 2014. The announcement followed the success of the band's latest Top 30 album, Getting Over the Storm, which was awarded BBC Radio 2's 'Album of the Week' accolade and received five-star reviews from the UK's music press upon its release in September 2013. On 22 November 2013, Astro announced in a statement that he had left the band, describing it as a "rudderless ship" and criticising the "serious lack of communication between the band and management" as well as the country-oriented direction of their latest album. Astro joined former UB40 members Ali Campbell and Mickey Virtue on stage at the indigO2 Arena in London on 6 December 2013, and on 17 January 2014, the trio announced on their website that they were in the studio recording new music. Ali Campbell was highly critical of his replacement in UB40, stating, "I sat back for five years and watched my brother Duncan murdering my songs." Ali Campbell toured as UB40 with Astro and Virtue over the summer. The new album, Silhouette, featuring the trio, was set for release on 6 October 2014.

In December 2014, Ali Campbell claimed that he would be prepared to go to the High Court in London over the matter rather than settle out of court.

Duncan Campbell retired from UB40 in June 2021 due to ill health, following a stroke he had suffered the previous year; he was replaced the following month by Matt Doyle of fellow Birmingham reggae band Kioko.

On 22 August 2021, saxophonist Brian Travers died of cancer at the age of 62 in his Moseley home. On 6 November of that year, former vocalist and founding member Astro died following a short illness at the age of 64.

In August 2022, the band performed "Red Red Wine" at the Commonwealth Games Closing Ceremony, with the show also featuring other acts from Birmingham and the West Midlands region, such as Musical Youth, Panjabi MC, Dexys, Ozzy Osbourne and Apache Indian. They also released the single "Champion" in association with the Commonwealth Games, with this Official Anthem being their first single sung by Matt Doyle. "Champion" also features Dapz on the Map and Gilly G, and can be found on the On Record compilation of Birmingham-based bands, alongside "It's a Brum Ting" by Friendly Fire Band, the track the BBC used for their Commonwealth Games coverage.

On April 19, 2024 the band released their 21st studio album, UB45, celebrating their 45th anniversary. The album features new tracks like "Fool Me Once" and "Say Nothing," alongside re-recordings of classics such as "Food For Thought," "Red Red Wine," and "Kingston Town". It debuted at #5 on the U.K. Official Albums Chart. The Ultimate edition of the album includes the Birmingham City Football Club Fan favourite, "Forever True", a revamp of their hit song, "Food For Thought" that the Blues fans sing each time that the team score a goal.

Speaking about the track to the BBC, lead singer Matt Doyle said: "Now we wanted something that's just for them. We can say: 'We appreciate the support over the years and singing the song when you score a goal, so here's something for you."

On the 3rd November, 2025 UB40 announced on social media that they are working on their new album, titled "Unstoppable" that is due to be released in early 2027.

In June 2026 whilst on the UK leg of their Unstoppable World Tour, the band announced that a new song that had been added to their setlist, a cover of Shania Twain's "You're Still the One" would be featured on their upcoming Unstoppable album.

== Influences ==
UB40 were influenced by the many blues parties they attended as teenagers in the multicultural Balsall Heath area of Birmingham. They were inspired by artists like Bob Marley and Elvis Presley. Their love of ska, reggae and early lovers rock inspired such original tracks as "King", "Madam Medusa", "Food for Thought", "Signing Off" and "One in Ten". Their early musical style was unique, with a heavy influence of analogue synthesisers, psychedelic rock guitar, saxophone and dub producer techniques.

The Campbell brothers are the sons of the late folk musician, Ian Campbell. Their father regularly took them to folk festivals and gigs and introduced them to music and to touring. It was at his father's folk club "Jug O' Punch" that Ali Campbell made his singing debut with Dave Swarbrick's daughter, Suss, singing "Why Does It Have To Be Me?".

== Achievements ==
UB40 are one of the most commercially successful reggae acts in history in terms of record sales (over 100 million), chart positions, and touring schedule. Over the course of their career, they have performed sell-out shows worldwide, headlined the Reggae Sunsplash music festival in Jamaica, and introduced reggae to places such as Russia and South America. They have performed twice at the Night of the Proms, in 2000 and 2006. They have been nominated for the Grammy Award for Best Reggae Album four times, and in 1984, they were nominated for the Brit Award for Best British Group.

In October 2011, UB40 were honoured with a Heritage Award, a ceremonial plaque from the UK's PRS for Music. The plaque was placed at the Hare & Hounds Pub in Birmingham, England, the venue where they played their first gig.

All three of their UK number one hits and all of their five US top 40 hits were cover versions. UB40's collaborators include: Pato Banton, Madness, Bitty McLean, Chrissie Hynde, Maxi Priest, Robert Palmer, Hunterz, Japanese artist Mikidozan, French artist Nuttea, Lady Saw, Afrika Bambaataa, and 808 State. With 214 weeks spent on the UK singles charts during the 1980s, UB40 and Madness hold the record for the most weeks spent by a group on the UK singles charts during that decade.

Reflecting on the group's longevity, Ali Campbell has said that they were fortunate in choosing a relatively young genre, as reggae "... hasn't outlived its own cool like jazz has".

In 2025 the band partnered with the Royal Television Society to launch the UB40 Music Video Award. The inaugural award was won by Joan Armatrading & the Mockingbird Film Co for the "I'm Not Moving" music video.

== Band members ==
=== Current members ===
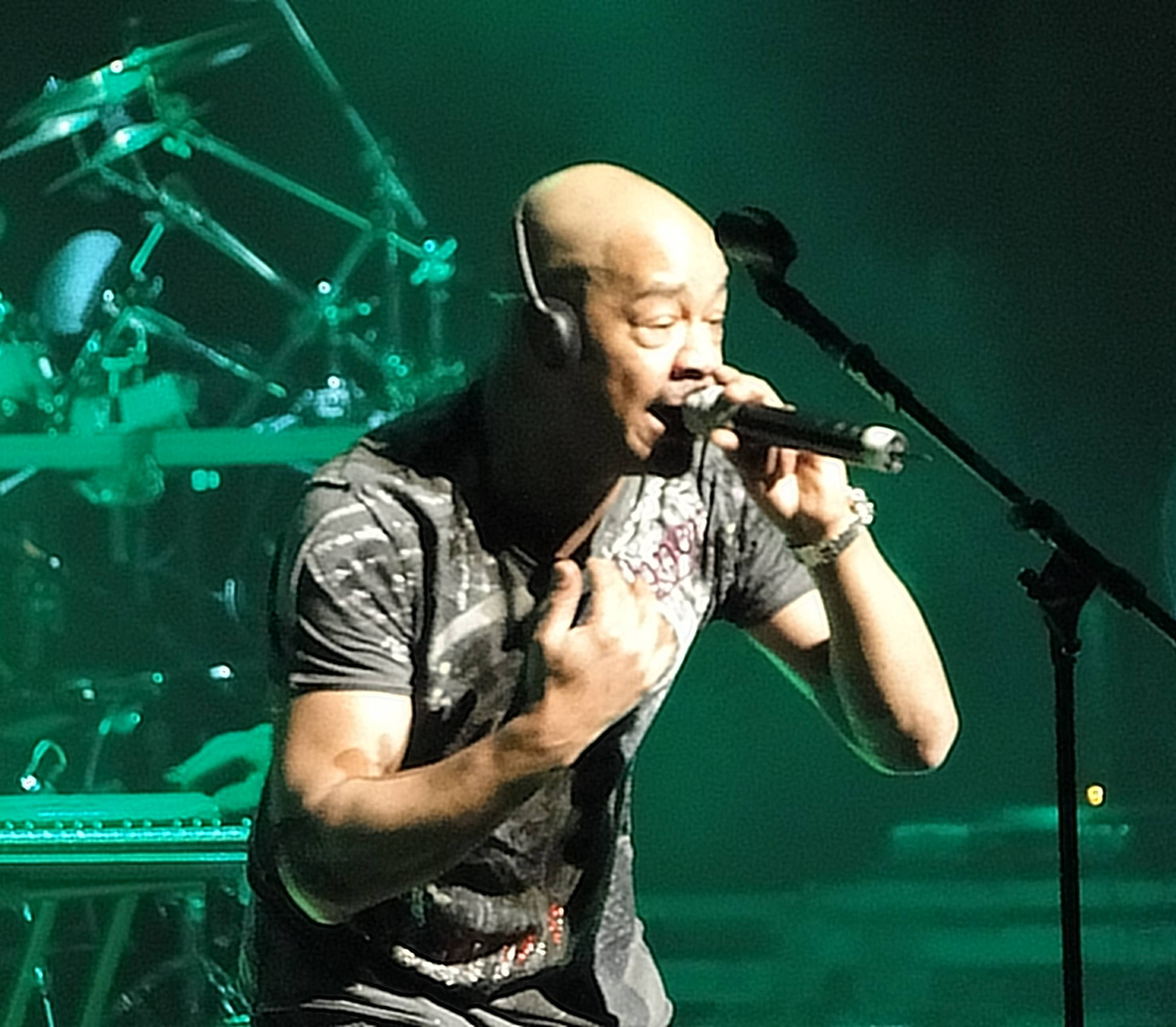
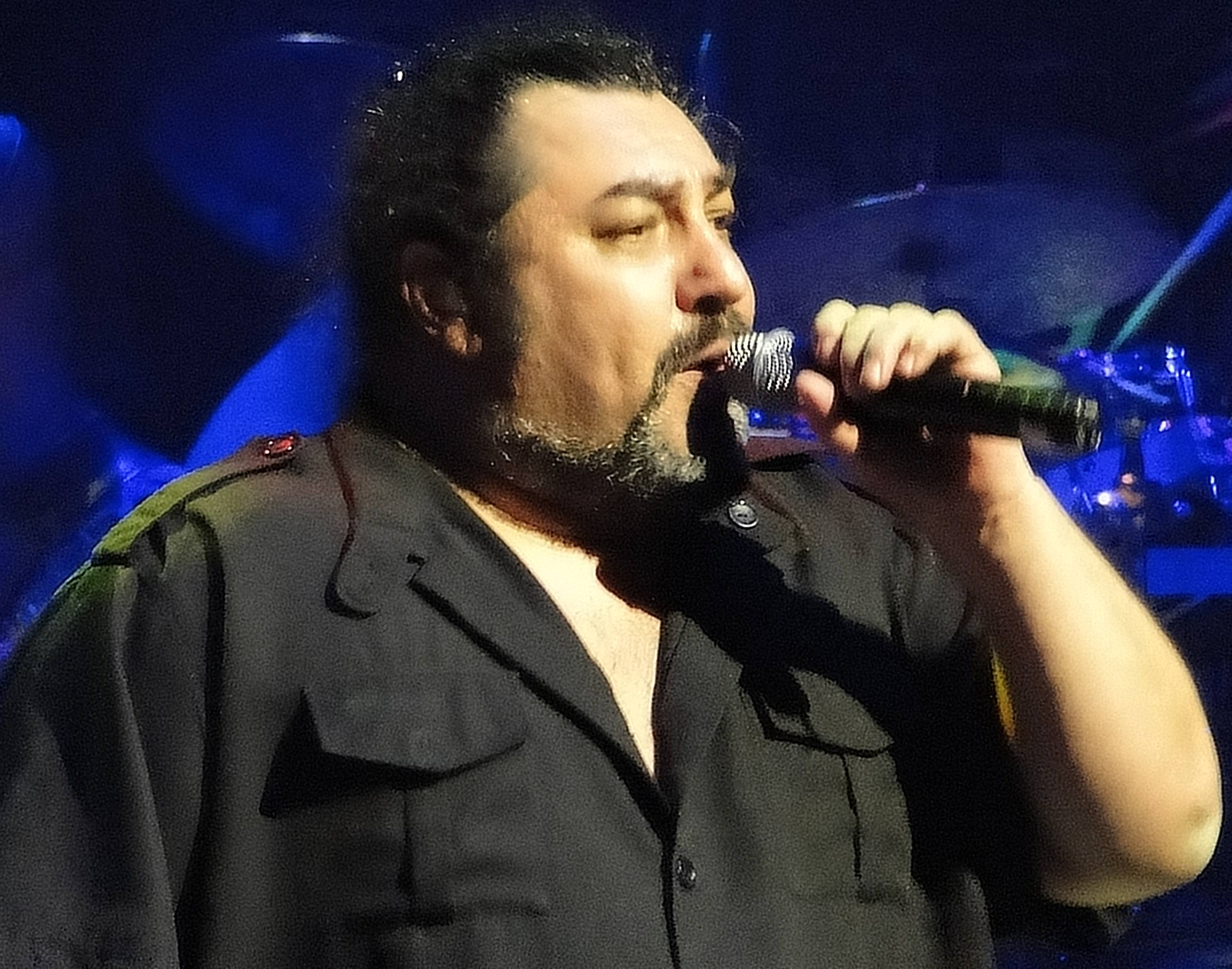
Current original members of UB40. Clockwise from top left: Robin Campbell, Earl Falconer, Norman Hassan, Jim Brown
- Jimmy Brown – drums (1978–present)
- Robin Campbell – guitar, vocals, keyboards (1978–present)
- Earl Falconer – bass guitar, synth bass, vocals, keyboards (1978–present)
- Norman Hassan – percussion, vocals, trombone (1978–present)
- Laurence Parry – trumpet, flügel horn, trombone, backing vocals (2016–present; session/touring 1994–2016)
- Martin Meredith – alto saxophone, keyboards, WX7 (2016–present; session/touring 1997–2016)
- Matt Doyle – vocals, guitar (2021–present)
- Ian Thompson – tenor saxophone, keyboards, percussion (2019–present; previously substituted for Travers from 2019)
- Gilly G – toasting, backing vocals (2023–present; guest 2018–2023)
- Jahred Gordon – keyboards, guitar, bass, saxophone (2023–present)
- Matt Campbell – backing vocals (2023–present)

=== Former members ===
Former original members of UB40. Clockwise from top left: Ali Campbell, Astro, Brian Travers, Mickey Virtue.
- Brian Travers – tenor saxophone (1978–2021; died 2021)
- Ali Campbell – vocals, guitar (1978–2008)
- Yomi Babayemi – percussion (1978–1979)
- Jimmy Lynn – keyboards (1978–1979)
- Mickey Virtue – keyboards (1979–2008)
- Astro – toasting, vocals, percussion, trumpet (1979–2013; died 2021)
- Duncan Campbell – vocals (2008–2021)
- Tony Mullings – keyboards (2016–2023; session/touring 2008–2016)

Former touring members

- Henry Tenyue – trombone (1983–1994)
- Patrick Tenyue – trumpet (1983–1994)

== Biographies ==
=== Duncan Campbell ===
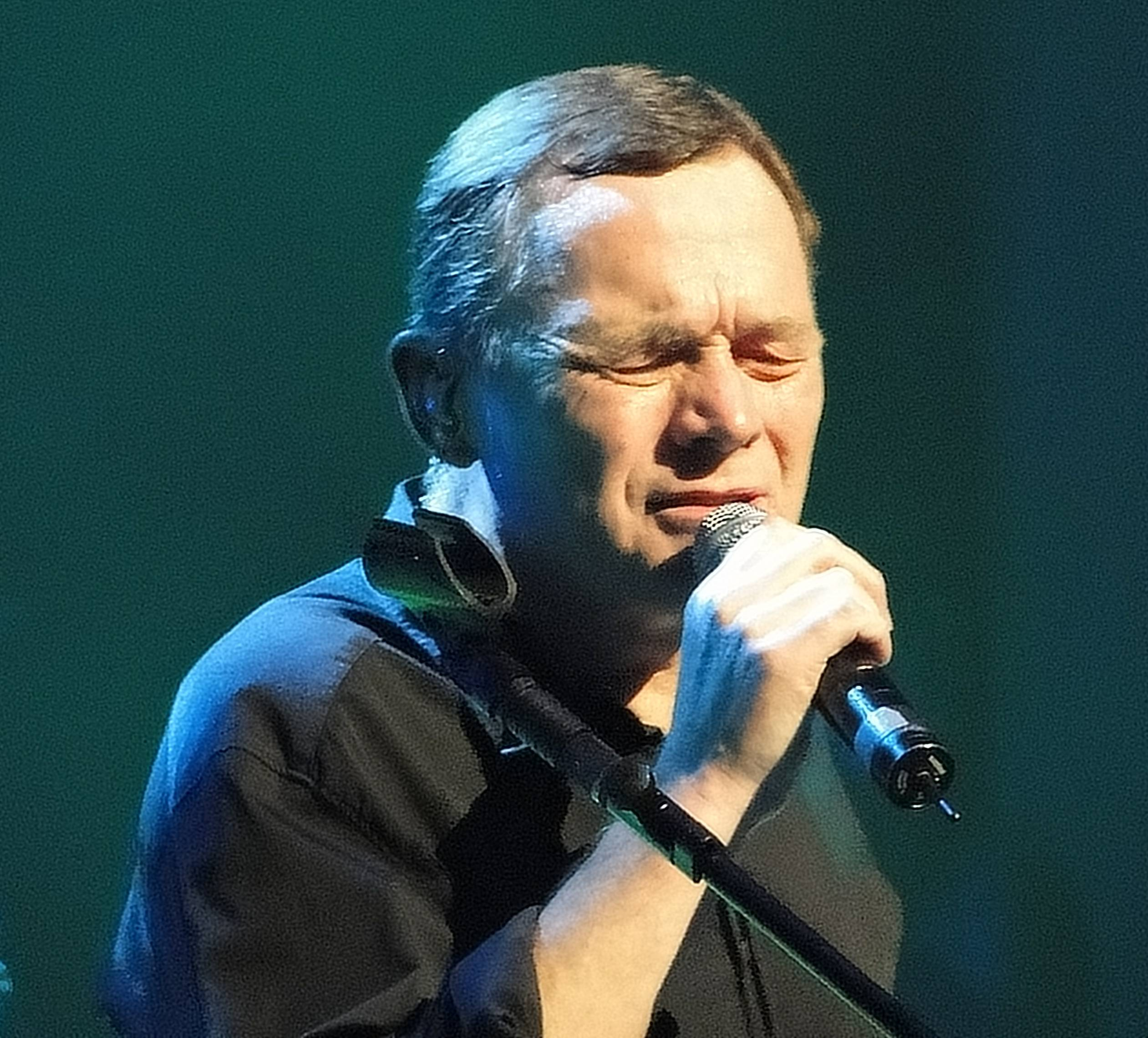
Duncan Campbell with UB40, Birmingham Symphony Hall, 2010

Duncan Campbell (born 3 April 1958 in Birmingham) is an English musician and former lead singer of UB40. He joined the band in 2008 after the departure of his brother Ali Campbell, the former UB40 lead singer. Current bandmate Robin Campbell is also his brother, and he is the son of the late folk singer Ian Campbell. Campbell announced his retirement from live concert performances after suffering a stroke in August 2020. His replacement as lead singer was announced on 5 July 2021 as Matt Doyle, formerly of the band Kioko.

Campbell sang in a harmony group with his brothers as children and performed with their father on stage. He also recorded a reggae album in Jamaica for his brother Ali's record label, but it was never released. He was a professional spoon player. "I was the only professional spoon player in the country registered with the Musicians' Union – until they registered me as a vocalist," said Campbell. He also worked as a casino manager in Barbados, ran a fish and chip shop in Perth, Australia, and has worked as an actor.

On 24 January 2008, UB40 lead singer Ali Campbell announced that he was leaving the band after a dispute with the previous management; UB40 announced that they would carry on. On 30 April 2008, UB40 unveiled Duncan as their new lead singer.

Duncan was offered the position of lead singer in 1978, but turned it down at the time, and said that he "wouldn't get the chance in another 30 years". Ali Campbell was "disappointed but didn't object" to him joining UB40. When asked why he did not join UB40 in 1978, he joked that it was because they were "crap" and that he "was too smart for them and he knew that they would get nowhere".

In 2014, Ali formed his own version of UB40 with Astro and Mickey Virtue named "UB40 featuring Ali Campbell" He said of his brother's singing, "I sat back for five years and watched my brother Duncan murdering my songs. We're saving the legacy". Duncan suffered a stroke in August 2020 and announced his retirement from the band in June 2021, citing ill health.

=== Mickey Virtue ===
Virtue in 2018

Michael "Mickey" Virtue (born 19 January 1957) is a retired British keyboardist. He is best known for being a member of UB40 from 1978 to 2008, and then a member of the UB40 splinter group featuring original vocalists Ali Campbell and Astro from 2013 to 2018.

Virtue joined UB40 in February 1979, a month after their first gig, replacing original keyboardist Jimmy Lynn. He spent the next three decades with the band, during which he used organs, synthesizers and samplers on the bands albums.

Virtue left UB40 in 2008, shortly after frontman Ali Campbell had left over tensions regarding management. In 2013, they, along with vocalist/percussionist Astro, formed their own version of UB40, "UB40 featuring Ali, Astro and Mickey". When speaking about the original UB40 band in 2016, Virtue said: "For me the other group is now a tribute band". Virtue left Ali Campbell's UB40 in late 2018 and has not been active in music since.

Upon his retirement, Campbell said: "We wish Mickey well, of course, he has been with me for 40 years nearly, one of my mates. He contributed a lot to UB40, a lot more than people think, with all of the weird and wonderful synth lines from 1980 onwards. He's gone off to pursue other things and we just hope he's happy whatever he's doing".

Soon after his departure, original UB40 guitarist and brother of Ali Campbell, Robin Campbell, urged Virtue to "tell the truth" as to why he left, saying: "It would be nice if Mickey were to tell the truth about why he left us, if he was dumped by Ali, maybe we will get the truth at last. He was told things about us which made him leave at the same time as Ali".

Two of Virtue's sisters have been married to members of UB40: Elizabeth is married to drummer James Brown and Bernadette was Ali Campbell's first wife.

In a 2026 interview with Ali Campbell, he revealed that Virtue is living in Spain and works rescuing stray dogs off the streets.

=== Norman Hassan ===
Hassan in 2011

Norman Lamont Hassan (born 26 January 1958) is a British musician of Yemeni and Welsh descent, best known as a member of UB40 since its formation in 1978. Hassan was born in Birmingham to Yemeni and Welsh parents. He attended Park Hill School and later Queensbridge School in the city. Before joining UB40 in 1978, he worked as a carpet fitter.

Hassan joined UB40 in 1978, as one of two percussionists, along with Yomi Babayemi, who left the following year. As well as providing harmony vocals, Hassan has also provided lead vocals on tracks, including "Johnny Too Bad" and "Guilty" on their 1983 Labour of Love album.

He is sometimes credited under his full name on albums. Hassan is still performs in UB40 today along with original members Robin Campbell, James Brown, and Earl Falconer.

When Hassan first joined UB40, he was just a percussion player, but by the time the band were recording their second studio album, Present Arms, in 1981, he had learned the trombone so it could be used on recordings and in live performances. He also plays the congas, electronic drums, and the harmonica. As of 2022, he uses a Roland Octapad SPD-30 electronic drum pad on stage.

In October 2011, Hassan was one of five original members of UB40 (Brian Travers, Astro, James Brown, and Ali Campbell) who were delcared bankrupt when their DEP International label had bankruptcy proceedings initiated against them in relation to debts of the label.

Like the rest of UB40, he still resides in the city of Birmingham. He is a fan of the local football club Birmingham City. His musical tastes are wide-ranging, from reggae to soul to opera. In 2021, his nephew, Matt Doyle, became UB40's new lead singer. Hassan caused controversy in 2023 when he posted on Twitter comparing Israelis to Nazis.

== UB40 featuring Ali Campbell ==
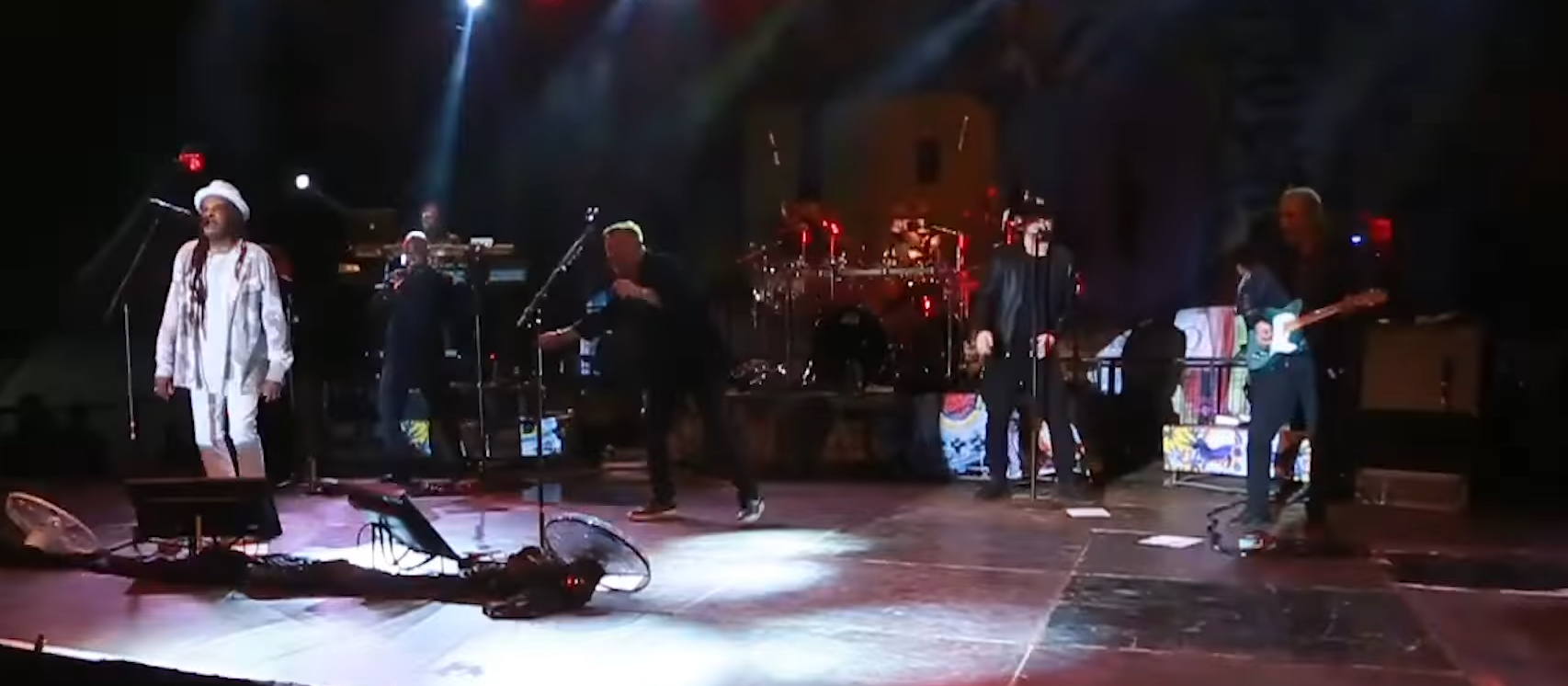
UB40 Featuring Ali and Astro performing in 2020.

In January 2014, Astro, along with former UB40 members Ali Campbell and Mickey Virtue, announced plans to reform and record under the UB40 name. The band released their new song, "Reggae Music", as a free download in January 2014. In February, with both the original band and the newly formed splinter group set to perform in Dubai under the name UB40 within a few months of each other, Ali Campbell's group announced a name change to "UB40 Reunited".

The splinter group later changed its name again, settling on "UB40 featuring Ali, Astro, and Mickey", until late 2018, when Virtue departed the band. After this, they continued touring and recording as "UB40 featuring Ali Campbell and Astro".

Astro died on 6 November 2021, after recording tracks for the band's new album, Unprecedented. The first single from these sessions, "Sufferer", was released in February 2022, with the album due to be released by UMC on 17 June 2022. Ali Campbell's UB40 splinter group also featured the vocalist Matt Hoy until he quit in July 2021.

Following Astro's death, Ali Campbell rebranded his band to "UB40 featuring Ali Campbell". It continues to tour as of 2026, with Campbell maintaining that there was “absolutely no” chance of a reunion with the original UB40.

== Discography ==
- Signing Off (1980)
- Present Arms (1981)
- UB44 (1982)
- Labour of Love (1983)
- Geffery Morgan (1984)
- Baggariddim (1985)
- Rat in the Kitchen (1986)
- UB40 (1988)
- Labour of Love II (1989)
- Promises and Lies (1993)
- Guns in the Ghetto (1997)
- Labour of Love III (1998)
- Cover Up (2001)
- Homegrown (2003)
- Who You Fighting For? (2005)
- TwentyFourSeven (2008)
- Labour of Love IV (2010)
- Getting Over the Storm (2013)
- For the Many (2019)
- Bigga Baggariddim (2021)
- UB45 (2024)

== See also ==
- List of best-selling music artists
- List of dub artists
- Gary Tyler – biographical subject of a song by UB40
