= Jimmy Brown (drummer) =

English drummer (born 1957)

- Brown in 2011

Background information
- Born: 20 November 1957 (age 69); Birmingham, England
- Genre: Reggae
- Instrument: Drums
- Years active: 1978–present
- Member of: UB40

James Brown (born 20 November 1957), also known as Jim or Jimmy Brown, is an English drummer, who has been a member of UB40 since its inception in 1978.

== Early life ==
Brown was born in Birmingham and grew up in the Small Heath area. His father was a BSA factory worker. Brown has two siblings. With the other members of UB40 having Afro-Caribbean, Scottish, Irish, Welsh, and Yemeni background, Brown, who was born to English parents, is the only member who is "entirely English". He went to art school.

Brown took an interest in drums as a teenager when he would start "tapping out rhythms" on his desk at school. He first tried to play a drum kit when he was fourteen, but he "just bashed at it. I had no idea about kick, snare and hats at that age". His first job was at fourteen years old, at a meat market at the Bull Ring shopping centre.

== Career ==
Brown in 1987

Some of Brown's drumming influences include Carlton Barrett and Sly Dunbar.

In mid-1978, Brown began rehearsing reggae songs with guitarist Ali Campbell and bassist Earl Falconer. This led to more people entering the band and the formation of UB40. Brown has remained with UB40 since, and has contributed the band as a songwriter and occasional backing vocalist.

Horace Panter of The Specials listed Brown among others as one of "the best white reggae drummers" in his memoir, Ska'd For Life.

In 2006, he recorded the album Dub Specimen Volume One with UB40 bassist Earl Falconer.

== Instruments ==
Throughout his drumming career, Brown has played both acoustic and electronic kits. In the 1980s, he experimented with synthesized percussion, electronic drums and machines. During the making of the bands Cover Up and Homegrown albums, Brown and Falconer insisted that the band incorporate computer-generated rhythms on the albums' tracks.

He currently plays on stage "basic kick, snare, hats, toms and cymbals" but also has "eight different trigger pads scattered around the kit".

== Personal life ==
Brown's wife Elizabeth, who he married before UB40 had even formed, was born to a Jamaican father and an Irish mother. They have four daughters and three grandchildren. Like most of his fellow UB40 bandmates, Brown still lives in Birmingham.

In October 2011, Brown was one of five original UB40 (also Ali Campbell, Norman Hassan, Brian Travers, Astro) members who were declared bankrupt after debts were initiated to their DEP International label.

Brown describes himself as "politically-minded and very left-wing".

== Discography ==
=== Albums ===
| Year | Title | Notes |
|---|---|---|
| 2006 | Dub Specimen Volume One | Recorded with Earl Falconer |
