= Ali Campbell =

English singer & songwriter (born 1959)

- Campbell in 2018

Background information
- Born: Alistair Ian Campbell; 15 February 1959 (age 67); Birmingham, Warwickshire, England
- Genres: Reggae; dub
- Occupations: Singer; songwriter
- Instruments: Vocals; guitar
- Years active: 1977–present
- Label: Cooking Vinyl
- Formerly of: UB40
- Website: www.alicampbell.net ub40.org

Alistair Ian Campbell (born 15 February 1959) is an English singer and songwriter who was lead singer and co-founder of the British reggae band UB40. UB40 sold more than 70 million records worldwide and toured for 30 years with the original line-up of the band.

In 2008 Campbell and keyboard-player Mickey Virtue left UB40 due to a dispute with band management and teamed up in a new band. In August 2014, Campbell announced he and Virtue had reunited with former UB40 bandmate Astro, who also left due to management disputes and the musical direction of the band. Campbell then formed a new UB40 featuring the three bandmates. As of 2021, he still tours in the new UB40 group, but solo as Virtue retired in 2018 and Astro died in 2021.

== Early life ==
Alistair Ian Campbell was born in Birmingham, England, the son of the Scottish folk singer Ian Campbell. He is the brother of UB40 guitarist Robin Campbell, and Duncan Campbell, who took over from Ali as UB40 frontman from 2008 until 2021.

== Career ==
=== UB40 ===
In mid-1978, Campbell began rehearsing reggae covers with bassist Earl Falconer and drummer James Brown. With the addition of more people including percussionist Norman Hassan, saxophonist Brian Travers, and Campbell's brother Robin on guitar, the group became UB40 in December 1978. By 1979, vocalist Astro and keyboardist Mickey Virtue were in the group. With UB40, the band scored three UK number ones with covers of "Red Red Wine", "I Got You Babe" (with Chrissie Hynde) and "Can't Help Falling in Love".

On 24 January 2008, it was reported that Campbell was to quit the group after almost 30 years. Campbell, who was a founding member of UB40, songwriter and lead vocalist, finally quit the band in 2008. Their last gigs together were in February 2008 in Australia, New Zealand and Uganda.

Campbell then issued a statement on his website and through his solicitors stating that for many years he had been unhappy with the business practices and business managers of UB40 and launched an investigation into the financial handling of the business. This was the reason for his departure. A few months later, keyboard player Michael Virtue also left UB40, citing the same reasons as Campbell, and joined Campbell's legal investigation. Virtue subsequently joined Campbell's new band, the Dep band.

In August 2014, Campbell announced that he had reunited with former UB40 bandmates Virtue and Astro (who had left UB40 the previous year) to record a new album, Silhouette. He said of his brother Duncan's singing, "I sat back for five years and watched my brother Duncan murdering my songs. We're saving the legacy". They initially toured under the name 'UB40 featuring Ali, Astro and Mickey', leading to legal action brought by the other UB40. Their first release was The Hits of UB40 Live in 2015. In 2016, their Unplugged album reached number 17 on the UK Albums Chart. A Real Labour of Love was released in March 2018, an album much in the vein of UB40's Labour of Love series. It reached number two on the UK Albums Chart, and entered the Billboard Reggae Albums chart at number one.

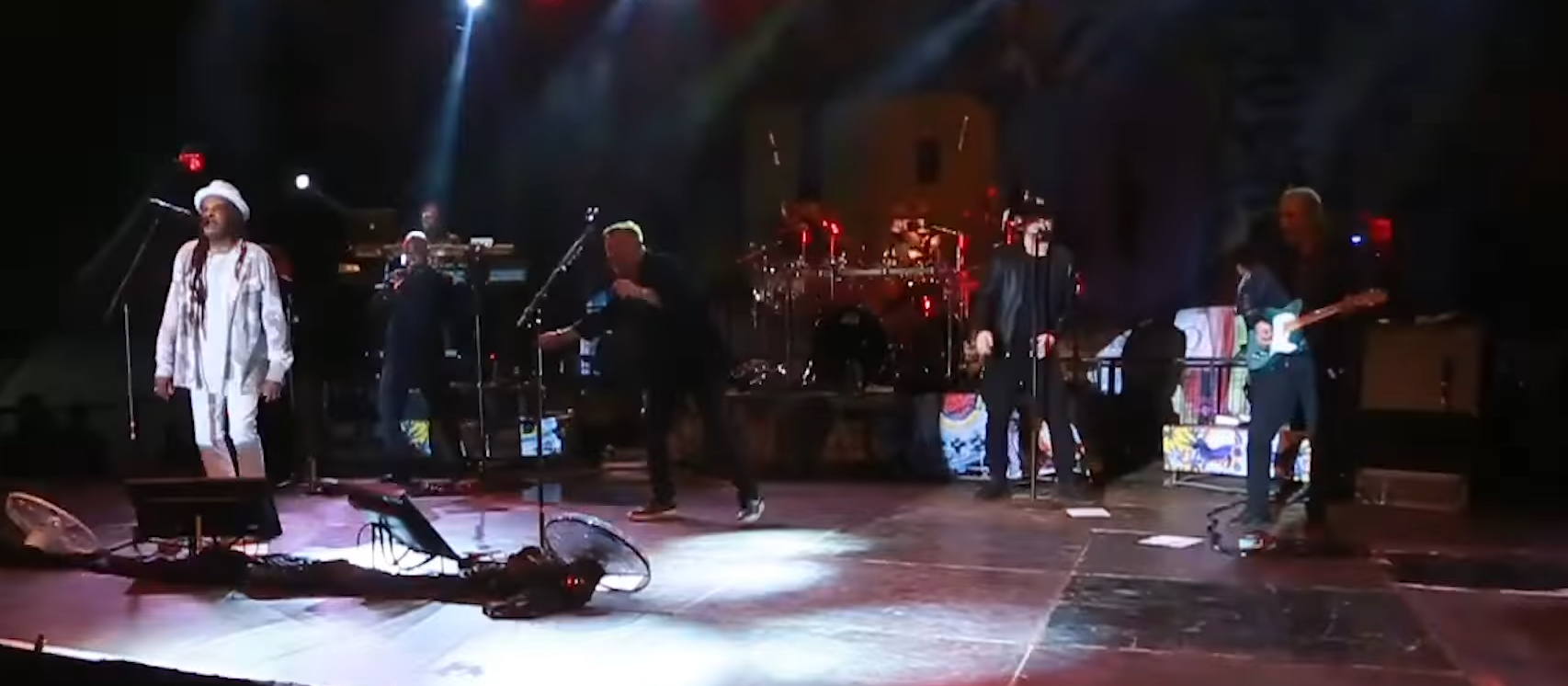
UB40 Featuring Ali and Astro performing in 2020

Virtue departed the band in late 2018, following which the band has operated under the name 'UB40 featuring Ali Campbell and Astro'. In July 2021, Matt Hoy, who had been a vocalist for the band, was forced out after his reluctancy to take the Covid-19 vaccine. On 6 November 2021, Astro died after a short illness. In 2022, the first single from the band's final album with Astro, "Sufferer" was released. On 17 June 2022, UB40 featuring Ali Campbell and Astro released the album Unprecedented via UMC, with Campbell fulfilling his UB40 tour dates in the run-up to the album's release, with the tour now billed as being 'in memory of Astro'. Since then, the band is now rebilled as "UB40 featuring Ali Campbell".

=== Solo ===
Campbell scored a number 1 hit in 1994 as featured artist, along with brother Robin, on Pato Banton's cover of The Equals' "Baby Come Back". On 18 October 2010 Ali released his fourth solo album Great British Songs—a collection of British pop and rock hits from the 1960s and 1970s. The album reached 15 on the UK Albums Chart where it remained for three weeks. It also gave Campbell his third top 15 charting album in as many years. Critic David Jefferies of AllMusic said of the album, "Longtime fans will appreciate that Campbell's voice is as strong as ever, but it deserves a better showcase than this mixed bag". Campbell's label Jacaranda Music was number one on the UK independent chart in October 2010 and Great British Songs also entered the iTunes reggae album chart at number one.

In October 2007, Campbell released a solo album titled Running Free. It entered the UK Albums Chart at number 9 and went gold. This was the first top ten entry for Campbell for a new studio album since UB40s Labour of Love 3 album, which was released 10 years prior. In 2012, Campbell was announced as one of the three judges on the judging panel of the TV show New Zealand's Got Talent, along with Jason Kerrison and Rachel Hunter. In 2013, Campbell was replaced for the third series by American choreographer Cris Judd.

== Awards and nominations ==
UB40 received an Ivor Novello Award for International Achievement in 2003. At the 2007 Grammy Awards, UB40 were nominated for best reggae album of 2006. Mauritius Government award to Ali Campbell for his services to Music and Charity – December 2010.

== Personal life ==
Campbell is the father of eight children, including two with his current wife, Julie.

== Discography ==
=== Studio albums ===
List of studio albums, with selected details
Title	Album details	Peak chart positions		Certifications
Title	Album details	UK	SCO	Certifications
Big Love	Released: 17 June 1995; Label: KUFF; Formats: CD, Digital download, streaming	6	-	
Running Free	Released: 8 October 2007; Label: CRUMBS; Formats: CD, Digital download, streaming	9	-	
Flying High	Released: July 2009; Label: JACARANDA; Formats: CD, Digital download, streaming	13	-	
Great British Songs	Released: 23 October 2010; Label: JACARANDA; Formats: CD, Digital download, streaming	15	-	
Silhouette (as Ali Campbell - The Legendary Voice Of UB40 - Reunited With Astro & Mickey)	Released: 11 October 2014; Label: Cooking Vinyl; Formats: CD, Digital download, streaming	18	-	
Unprecedented (as UB40 featuring Ali and Astro)	Released: 1 July 2022; Label: UMC; Formats: CD, Digital download, streaming, Vinyl	8	-	

=== Compilation albums ===
List of studio albums, with selected details
Title	Album details	Peak chart positions		Certifications
Title	Album details	UK	SCO	Certifications
The Hits of UB40 Live (as UB40 featuring Ali, Astro & Mickey)	Released: 2015; Label: Estupendo; Formats: CD, Digital download, streaming	-	-	
Unplugged + Greatest Hits (as UB40 featuring Ali, Astro & Mickey)	Released: 18 November 2016; Label: Estupendo; Formats: CD, Digital download, streaming	17	-	
A Real Labour of Love (as UB40 featuring Ali, Astro & Mickey)	Released: 2 March 2018; Label: Estupendo; Formats: CD, Digital download, streaming	2	-	

=== Singles ===
Year	Title	Chart peak positions			Album
Year	Title	UK	AUS	NZ	Album
1995	"That Look in Your Eye" (with Pamela Starks)	5	80	2	Big Love
1995	"Let Your Yeah Be Yeah"	25	—	15	Big Love
1995	"Somethin' Stupid" (with Kibibi Campbell)	30	—	13	Big Love
2007	"Hold Me Tight"	—	—	—	Running Free
2007	"Would I Lie to You" (with Bitty McLean)	—	—	—	Running Free
2008	"Running Free" (with Beverley Knight)	—	—	—	Running Free
2009	"Out from Under"	—	—	—	Running Free
2010	"Carrie Anne"	—	—	—	Running Free

== Filmography ==
Live Concert Stream

- In Memory Of Astro (2022) - On 27 May 2022, streaming service On Air released the In Memory of Astro live concert stream. Recorded at Ziggo Dome, Amsterdam, the career-spanning show was performed in memory of Ali Campbell’s dearly departed friend and bandmate Astro.
