= UB40 discography =

- Studio albums: 21
- Extended plays: 2
- Live albums: 6
- Compilation albums: 19
- Singles: 65
- Video albums: 12
- Music videos: 96
- Remix albums: 4

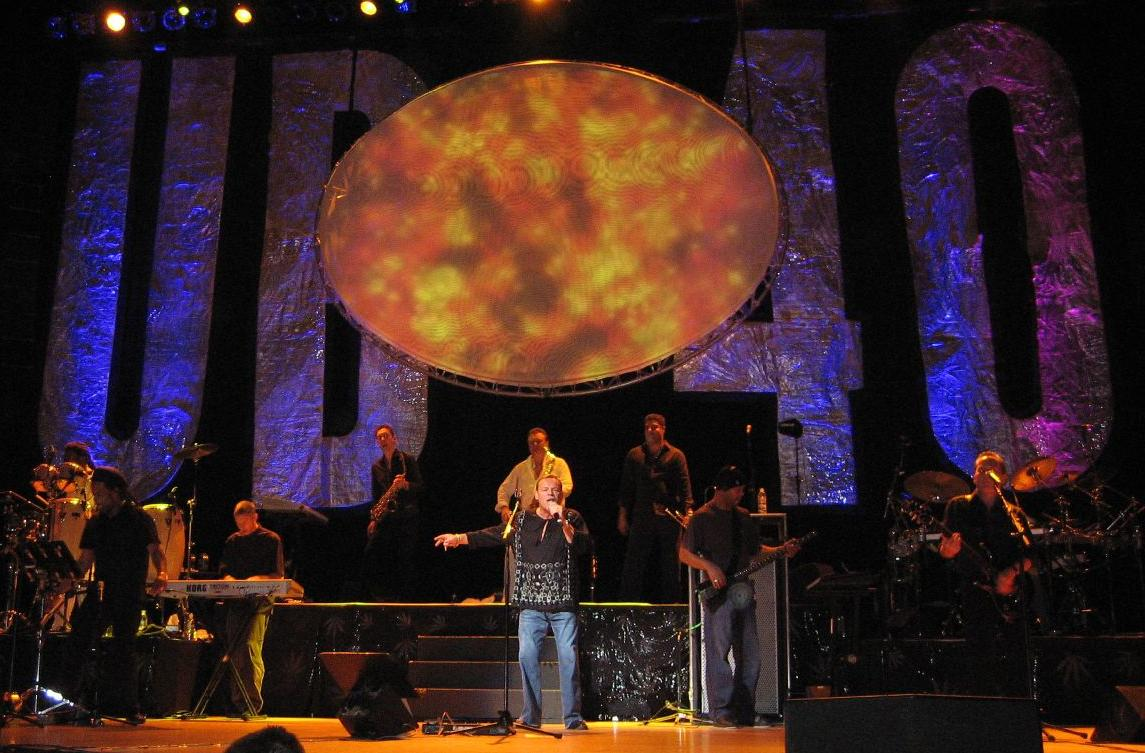
UB40 - Massey Hall, Toronto, Canada, - April 11, 2006

The discography of UB40, a British reggae band, consists of 21 studio albums, 19 compilation albums, six live albums, four remix albums, 65 singles, 12 video albums, 96 music videos and a number of appearances with other artists.

The band has sold over 100 million records worldwide. Their biggest hits include "Red Red Wine" (1983), "(I Can't Help) Falling in Love with You" (1993) and "I Got You Babe" (1985).

== Albums ==
=== Studio albums ===
Title	Album details	Peak chart positions										Certifications
Title	Album details	UK	AUS	AUT	CAN	GER	NL	NZ	SWE	SWI	US	Certifications
Signing Off	Released: 29 August 1980; Label: Graduate; Formats: LP, MC	2	26	—	—	—	—	4	—	—	—	BPI: Platinum; RMNZ: Platinum
Present Arms	Released: 29 May 1981; Label: DEP International; Formats: LP, MC	2	28	—	—	40	21	13	—	—	—	BPI: Platinum; NVPI: Gold
UB44	Released: 27 September 1982; Label: DEP International; Formats: LP, MC	4	89	—	—	—	21	—	—	—	—	BPI: Gold
Labour of Love	Released: 12 September 1983; Label: DEP International; Formats: LP, MC	1	14	—	5	29	1	1	—	—	14	BPI: 2× Platinum; BVMI: Gold; MC: Platinum; NVPI: Platinum; RIAA: Platinum; RMNZ: Platinum
Geffery Morgan	Released: 8 October 1984; Label: DEP International; Formats: LP, MC	3	—	—	51	59	9	27	49	—	60	BPI: Silver
Baggariddim	Released: 2 September 1985; Label: DEP International; Formats: CD, LP, MC	14	33	—	—	—	25	11	—	22	—	BPI: Gold
Rat in the Kitchen	Released: 28 July 1986; Label: DEP International; Formats: CD, LP, MC	8	51	—	37	—	3	4	—	21	53	BPI: Gold; MC: Gold; NVPI: Gold; RMNZ: Gold
UB40	Released: 11 July 1988; Label: DEP International; Formats: CD, LP, MC	12	41	—	46	62	7	11	32	15	44	BPI: Gold; NVPI: Gold; RMNZ: Gold
Labour of Love II	Released: 27 November 1989; Label: DEP International; Formats: CD, LP, MC	3	20	6	68	9	1	1	13	—	30	BPI: 3× Platinum; ARIA: Platinum; GLF: Gold; IFPI SWI: Platinum; MC: Gold; NVPI: Platinum; RIAA: Platinum; RMNZ: 2× Platinum
Promises and Lies	Released: 12 July 1993; Label: DEP International/Virgin; Formats: CD, LP, MC	1	1	2	2	2	1	1	4	2	6	BPI: 2× Platinum; ARIA: Gold; BVMI: Platinum; GLF: Gold; IFPI AUT: Gold; IFPI SWI: Platinum; MC: Platinum; NVPI: Platinum; RIAA: Platinum; RMNZ: Platinum
Guns in the Ghetto	Released: 30 June 1997; Label: DEP International/Virgin; Formats: CD, LP, MC	7	147	20	—	75	16	16	—	20	176	BPI: Silver
Labour of Love III	Released: 12 October 1998; Label: DEP International/Virgin; Formats: CD, MC	8	185	—	—	—	17	5	—	—	—	BPI: Gold; RMNZ: Platinum
Cover Up	Released: 22 October 2001; Label: DEP International/Virgin; Formats: CD, MC	29	—	—	—	84	18	22	—	—	—	
Homegrown	Released: 3 November 2003; Label: DEP International/Virgin; Formats: CD, MC	49	—	—	—	—	16	—	—	—	—	
Who You Fighting For?	Released: 13 June 2005; Label: DEP International/Virgin; Formats: CD	20	—	—	—	68	19	25	—	81	—	BPI: Silver; RMNZ: Gold
TwentyFourSeven	Released: 9 June 2008; Label: ReflexMuzic; Formats: CD, 2xLP	81	—	—	—	—	27	—	—	—	—	
Labour of Love IV	Released: 8 February 2010; Label: Virgin; Formats: CD	24	—	—	—	—	—	—	—	—	—	
Getting Over the Storm	Released: 2 September 2013; Label: Virgin/Universal Music; Formats: CD	29	—	—	—	—	43	—	—	—	—	
For the Many	Released: 15 March 2019; Label: Shoestring; Formats: CD, 2xCD, LP, digital download	29	—	—	—	—	—	—	—	—	—	
Bigga Baggariddim	Released: 25 June 2021; Label: Shoestring; Formats: CD, digital download	—	—	—	—	—	—	—	—	—	—	
UB45	Released: 19 April 2024; Label: SoNo; Formats: CD, digital download	5	—	—	—	—	—	—	—	94	—	
"—" denotes releases that did not chart or were not released in that territory.

=== Live albums ===
Title	Album details	Peak chart positions					Certifications
Title	Album details	UK	NL	NZ	SWI	US	Certifications
UB40 Live	Released: 18 February 1983; Label: DEP International; Formats: LP, MC	44	5	—	—	—	NVPI: Gold
UB40 CCCP: Live in Moscow	Released: June 1987; Label: DEP International; Formats: CD, LP, MC	—	6	36	14	121	
The Dancehall Album	Released: 27 April 1998; Label: DEP International/Virgin; Formats: CD, LP, MC	—	—	—	—	—	
Live at Montreux 2002	Released: 11 May 2007; Label: Eagle; Formats: CD	—	67	—	—	—	
The Lost Tapes – Live at the Venue 1980	Released: September 2008; Label: EMI/Virgin; Formats: CD	—	—	—	—	—	
UB40 at 40 – Live in Birmingham	Released: 19 February 2021; Label: Shoestring/Zoetrope; Formats: 2xCD+DVD, digital download	—	—	—	—	—	
"—" denotes releases that did not chart or were not released in that territory.

=== Remix albums ===
Title	Album details	Peak chart positions
Title	Album details	UK
Present Arms in Dub	Released: October 1981; Label: DEP International; Formats: LP, MC	38
Dub Sessions	Released: December 2007; Label: ReflexMuzic; Formats: CD, digital download; Sold at concerts	—
Dub Sessions II: Labour of Dub	Released: December 2009; Label: ReflexMuzic; Formats: digital download; Sold at concerts	—
Dub Sessions III	Released: October 2010; Label: ReflexMuzic; Formats: digital download; Sold at concerts	—
"—" denotes releases that did not chart.

=== Compilation albums ===
Title	Album details	Peak chart positions							Certifications
Title	Album details	UK	AUS	CAN	GER	NL	NZ	SWE	Certifications
The Singles Album	Released: August 1982; Label: Graduate; Formats: LP, MC	17	—	—	—	—	—	—	
1980–1983	Released: June 1983; Label: A&M; Formats: LP, MC; US and Canada-only release	—	—	94	—	—	—	—	
More UB40 Music	Released: September 1983; Label: Graduate; Formats: 2xLP, 2xMC	—	—	—	—	—	—	—	
The UB40 File	Released: March 1985; Label: Virgin; Formats: CD, 2xLP, MC	—	—	83	—	—	—	—	
The Best of UB40 – Volume One	Released: 26 October 1987; Label: DEP International/Virgin; Formats: CD, LP, MC	3	18	—	52	1	3	—	BPI: 6× Platinum; ARIA: Platinum; BVMI: Gold; GLF: Gold; NVPI: Platinum; RMNZ: Platinum
Labour of Love Parts I + II	Released: 25 November 1991; Label: DEP International/Virgin; Formats: 2xCD	5	142	—	—	69	8	—	BPI: Gold; RMNZ: Platinum
The Best of UB40 – Volume Two	Released: 30 October 1995; Label: DEP International/Virgin; Formats: 2xCD	12	—	—	91	24	9	—	BPI: Platinum; RMNZ: Platinum
The Very Best of UB40	Released: 23 October 2000; Label: DEP International/Virgin; Formats: CD, 2xLP, MC	7	134	—	—	8	4	4	BPI: 4× Platinum; NVPI: Platinum; RMNZ: 5× Platinum
UB40 Presents the Fathers of Reggae	Released: August 2002; Label: DEP International/Virgin; Formats: CD, 2xLP, MC	104	—	—	—	—	—	—	
Labour of Love, Volumes I, II and III – The Platinum Collection	Released: 2 June 2003; Label: DEP International/Virgin; Formats: 3xCD	7	—	—	—	5	6	—	BPI: Gold; RMNZ: 2× Platinum
The Best of UB40, Volumes 1 & 2	Released: 14 November 2005; Label: DEP International/Virgin; Formats: 2xCD	47	—	—	—	3	—	—	BPI: Gold
Love Songs	Released: 2 February 2009; Label: Virgin; Formats: CD	3	—	—	—	—	8	—	BPI: Gold; RMNZ: Platinum
Best of Labour of Love	Released: 22 November 2009; Label: Virgin; Formats: CD	29	—	—	—	—	24	—	BPI: Gold
All the Best	Released: April 2012; Label: EMI; Formats: 2xCD	—	—	—	—	—	—	—	
Collected	Released: 24 June 2013; Label: Universal Music; Formats: 3xCD; Netherlands-only release	—	—	—	—	4	—	—	
Red Red Wine: The Collection	Released: 30 June 2014; Label: Spectrum Music; Formats: CD	—	—	—	—	—	—	—	BPI: Platinum
Red Red Wine – The Essential UB40	Released: 23 September 2016; Label: Spectrum Music; Formats: 3xCD, digital download	51	—	—	—	—	—	—	BPI: Silver
Red Red Wine – The Collection: Volume II	Released: 26 October 2018; Label: Spectrum Music; Formats: CD, digital download	—	—	—	—	—	—	—	
Essential	Released: 9 October 2020; Label: UMC; Formats: 3xCD, digital download	30	—	—	—	—	—	—	BPI: Silver
"—" denotes releases that did not chart or were not released in that territory.

== EPs ==
Title	EP details	Peak chart positions	
Title	EP details	CAN	US
Little Baggariddim	Released: 22 July 1985; Label: A&M; Formats: 12", MC; US and Canada-only release	26	40
You Haven't Called	Released: 18 January 2019; Label: Shoestring; Formats: digital download	—	—
"—" denotes releases that did not chart or were not released in that territory.

== Singles ==
=== 1980s ===
Title	Year	Peak chart positions										Certifications	Album
Title	Year	UK	AUS	BEL (FL)	CAN	FRA	GER	IRE	NL	NZ	US	Certifications	Album
"King" / "Food for Thought"	1980	4	36	—	—	5	—	10	46	1	—	BPI: Silver; RMNZ: Platinum	Signing Off
"My Way of Thinking" / "I Think It's Going to Rain Today"	1980	6	90	—	—	—	—	12	—	6	—		Signing Off
"The Earth Dies Screaming" / "Dream a Lie"	1980	10	—	—	—	—	—	—	—	—	—		Non-album single
"Don't Let It Pass You By" / "Don't Slow Down"	1981	16	—	—	—	—	—	18	—	—	—		Present Arms
"One in Ten"	1981	7	87	—	—	—	—	18	—	20	—	RMNZ: Gold	Present Arms
"I Won't Close My Eyes"	1982	32	—	—	—	—	—	25	—	—	—		UB44
"Love Is All Is All Right"	1982	29	—	—	—	—	—	26	31	—	—		UB44
"So Here I Am"	1982	25	—	—	—	—	—	16	—	—	—		UB44
"Tyler" (12"-only release)	1982	— (Note: "Tyler" did not enter the UK Top 75; however, it did peak at number 22 on the UK Independent Singles Chart.)	—	—	—	—	—	—	—	—	—		The Singles Album
"I've Got Mine"	1983	45	—	—	—	—	—	29	12	—	—		Non-album single
"Food for Thought" (live; Continental Europe-only release)	1983	—	—	20	—	—	—	—	5	—	—		UB40 Live
"Red Red Wine"	1983	1	2	1	1	—	12	1	1	1	1 (Note: The song peaked at number 34 upon its original release in 1984. When re-released in 1988 it went to number 1.)	BPI: 2× Platinum; MC: Gold; NVPI: Gold; RIAA: Gold; RMNZ: 7× Platinum	Labour of Love
"Please Don't Make Me Cry"	1983	10	—	11	35	—	—	6	1	41	—	RMNZ: Platinum	Labour of Love
"Many Rivers to Cross"	1983	16	—	—	—	—	—	11	—	48	—	BPI: Silver; RMNZ: Gold	Labour of Love
"Cherry Oh Baby"	1984	12	—	22	—	—	—	7	7	—	—	BPI: Silver; RMNZ: Platinum	Labour of Love
"If It Happens Again"	1984	9	55	11	56	—	—	9	8	28	—	RMNZ: Gold	Geffery Morgan
"Riddle Me"	1984	59	—	—	—	—	—	—	34	—	—		Geffery Morgan
"I'm Not Fooled So Easily" / "The Pillow"	1985	79	—	—	—	—	—	—	—	—	—		Geffery Morgan
"I Got You Babe" (featuring Chrissie Hynde)	1985	1	1	4	6	29	15	1	2	1	28	BPI: Gold; RMNZ: 2× Platinum	Baggariddim
"Don't Break My Heart"	1985	3	37	15	—	—	—	8	11	13	—	BPI: Silver; RMNZ: Gold	Baggariddim
"Sing Our Own Song"	1986	5	76	7	70	—	—	4	1	7	—	NVPI: Gold	Rat in the Kitchen
"All I Want to Do"	1986	41	—	—	—	—	—	28	28	—	—		Rat in the Kitchen
"Rat in Mi Kitchen"	1987	12	84	4	—	—	—	7	7	45	—	BPI: Silver	Rat in the Kitchen
"Watchdogs"	1987	39	—	22	—	—	—	25	13	—	—		Rat in the Kitchen
"Maybe Tomorrow"	1987	14	—	7	—	—	—	6	5	—	—	RMNZ: Platinum	The Best of UB40 – Volume One
"Breakfast in Bed" (featuring Chrissie Hynde)	1988	6	43	10	91	—	40	9	10	5	—	RMNZ: Gold	UB40
"Where Did I Go Wrong"	1988	26	17	10	—	—	—	—	8	13	—	RMNZ: Gold	UB40
"Come Out to Play"	1988	77	95	16	—	—	—	—	33	—	—		UB40
"I Would Do for You"	1989	45	121	—	—	—	—	—	34	34	—		UB40
"Homely Girl"	1989	6	52	11	—	4	—	10	2	4	—	BPI: Silver; SNEP: Silver; RMNZ: 2× Platinum	Labour of Love II
"—" denotes releases that did not chart or were not released in that territory.

=== 1990s ===
Title	Year	Peak chart positions										Certifications	Album
Title	Year	UK	AUS	BEL (FL)	CAN	FRA	GER	IRE	NL	NZ	US	Certifications	Album
"Here I Am (Come and Take Me)"	1990	46	3 (Note: "Here I Am (Come and Take Me)" peaked at number 96 in Australia in 1990 on its initial release, and at number 3 when re-issued in 1991.)	34	43	14	—	22	9	6	7	ARIA: Gold; RMNZ: Gold	Labour of Love II
"Kingston Town"	1990	4	17 (Note: "Kingston Town" missed the top 100 in Australia in 1990 on its initial release, and peaked at number 17 in January 1992 after being re-issued.)	4	—	1	5	8	2	17	—	BPI: Platinum; ARIA: Gold; BVMI: Gold; RMNZ: 4× Platinum; SNEP: Gold	Labour of Love II
"Wear You to the Ball"	1990	35	132	—	—	—	—	—	—	28	—		Labour of Love II
"The Way You Do the Things You Do"	1990	49	63 (Note: "The Way You Do the Things You Do" peaked at number 78 in Australia in February 1991 on its initial release, and at number 63 when re-issued in 1992.)	37	42	11	53	26	15	—	6	BPI: Silver; RIAA: Gold; RMNZ: 3× Platinum; SNEP: Silver	Labour of Love II
"I'll Be Your Baby Tonight" (with Robert Palmer)	1990	6	4	12	—	24	14	6	4	1	—	RMNZ: Gold	Don't Explain
"Impossible Love"	1990	47	—	—	—	—	55	25	—	28	—		Labour of Love II
"Groovin'" (Continental Europe, and US-only release)	1990	—	—	38	—	—	—	—	13	—	90	RMNZ: Platinum	Labour of Love II
"Tears from My Eyes" (Continental Europe-only release)	1991	—	—	26	—	—	—	—	20	—	—	RMNZ: Gold	Labour of Love II
"Baby"	1991	87	—	—	—	—	—	—	—	—	—		Labour of Love Parts I + II
"One in Ten" (remix; with 808 State)	1992	17	—	—	—	—	—	19	22	—	—		Gorgeous
"(I Can't Help) Falling in Love with You"	1993	1	1	1	1	5	2	2	1	1	1	BPI: Platinum; ARIA: 2× Platinum; BVMI: Platinum; NVPI: Gold; RIAA: Platinum; RMNZ: 2× Platinum; SNEP: Silver	Promises and Lies
"Higher Ground"	1993	8	40	14	65	23	21	9	9	8	45	RMNZ: Gold	Promises and Lies
"Bring Me Your Cup"	1993	24	127	—	—	—	52	—	29	7	—	RMNZ: 2× Platinum	Promises and Lies
"C'est la Vie"	1994	37	59	—	—	—	—	—	34	7	—		Promises and Lies
"Reggae Music"	1994	28	138	—	—	—	—	—	—	48	—		Promises and Lies
"Until My Dying Day"	1995	15	—	—	—	—	88	—	—	37	—		The Best of UB40 – Volume Two
"Tell Me Is It True"	1997	14	181	—	—	—	89	—	27	20	—		Speed 2: Cruise Control - Original Motion Picture Soundtrack
"Always There"	1997	53	—	—	—	—	—	—	93	—	—		Guns in the Ghetto
"Come Back Darling"	1998	10	—	—	—	—	—	—	—	—	—		Labour of Love III
"Holly Holy"	1998	31	—	—	—	—	—	—	—	—	—		Labour of Love III
"The Train Is Coming"	1999	30	—	—	—	—	—	—	—	—	—		Labour of Love III
"—" denotes releases that did not chart or were not released in that territory.

=== 2000s–2020s ===
Title	Year	Peak chart positions					Certifications	Album
Title	Year	UK	FRA	GER	NL	NZ	Certifications	Album
"Light My Fire"	2000	63	—	—	87	—		The Very Best of UB40
"Since I Met You Lady" (featuring Lady Saw)	2001	40	—	—	69	—		Cover Up
"Cover Up" (featuring Nuttea)	2002	54	10	—	—	—	SNEP: Gold	Cover Up
"Swing Low" (featuring United Colours of Sound)	2003	15	—	—	—	—		Homegrown
"Kiss and Say Goodbye"	2005	19	—	89	45	16	RMNZ: Gold	Who You Fighting For?
"Reasons" (featuring Hunterz and the Dhol Blasters)	2005	75	—	—	—	—		Who You Fighting For?
"Bling Bling" (Continental Europe-only release)	2005	—	—	—	78	—		Who You Fighting For?
"Lost & Found" / "Dance Until the Morning Light" (with Maxi Priest featuring DJ Rapper Truth)	2008	—	—	—	—	—		TwentyFourSeven
"Bring It On Home to Me"	2009	—	—	—	—	—		Labour of Love IV
"Get Along Without You Now"	2010	—	—	—	—	—		Labour of Love IV
"Message of Love" (featuring House of Shem)	2021	—	—	—	—	—		Bigga Baggariddim
"Champion" (with Gilly G)	2022	—	—	—	—	—		UB45
"Gimme Some Kinda Sign" (with Gilly G)	2024	—	—	—	—	—		UB45
"Home"	2024	—	—	—	—	—		UB45
"Forever True"	2024	—	—	—	—	—		UB45
"—" denotes releases that did not chart or were not released in that territory.

=== As featured artist ===
Title	Year	Peak chart positions					Album
Title	Year	UK	BEL (FL)	IRE	NL	NZ	Album
"Reckless" (Afrika Bambaataa featuring UB40)	1988	17	7	19	4	13	The Light

== Videography ==
=== Video albums ===
Title	Video details
Labour of Love	Released: 1984; Label: Virgin; Formats: VHS, Laserdisc, Betamax
Live	Released: 1984; Label: Virgin Video; Format: VHS
UB40 CCCP – The Video Mix	Released: 1987; Label: A&M Video; Formats: VHS, Laserdisc
The Best of UB40 – Volume One	Released: 1987; Label: Virgin Music Video; Format: VHS
Labour of Love II	Released: 1989; Label: Virgin Music Video; Format: VHS
A Family Affair – Live in Concert	Released: 1991; Label: Virgin Music Video; Formats: VHS, Laserdisc
Live in New South Africa	Released: 1995; Label: Picture Music International; Formats: VHS, Laserdisc
Rockpalast Live	Released: 2000; Label: Pioneer Entertainment; Format: DVD
The UB40 Story of Reggae	Released: 2001; Label: NVC Arts; Format: DVD
The Collection	Released: 2002; Label: Virgin; Format: DVD
Homegrown in Holland Live	Released: 2004; Label: Warner Music Vision; Format: DVD
Live at Montreux 2002	Released: 2007; Label: Eagle Vision; Formats: DVD, Blu-ray

=== Music videos ===
Year	Title	Album
1980	"My Way of Thinking"	Signing Off
1980	"I Think It's Going to Rain Today"	Signing Off
1980	"Food for Thought"	Signing Off
1980	"The Earth Dies Screaming"	non-album
1980	"Dream a Lie"	non-album
1981	"One in Ten"	Present Arms
1982	"I Won't Close My Eyes"	UB44
1982	"Love Is All Is All Right"	UB44
1983	"I've Got Mine"	non-album
1983	"Many Rivers to Cross" (Version 1)	Labour of Love
1984	"Version Girl"	Labour of Love
1984	"Sweet Sensation"	Labour of Love
1984	"Cherry Oh Baby"	Labour of Love
1984	"Red Red Wine"	Labour of Love
1984	"Guilty"	Labour of Love
1984	"Please Don't Make Me Cry"	Labour of Love
1984	"She Caught the Train"	Labour of Love
1984	"Johnny Too Bad"	Labour of Love
1984	"Many Rivers to Cross" (Version 2)	Labour of Love
1984	"If It Happens Again"	Geffery Morgan
1984	"Riddle Me"	Geffery Morgan
1984	"The Pillow"	Geffery Morgan
1985	"I'm Not Fooled So Easily"	Geffery Morgan
1985	"I Got You Babe" (with Chrissie Hynde)	Baggariddim
1985	"Don't Break My Heart"	Baggariddim
1986	"Sing Our Own Song"	Rat in the Kitchen
1986	"All I Want to Do"	Rat in the Kitchen
1986	"Rat in Mi Kitchen"	Rat in the Kitchen
1987	"Maybe Tomorrow"	The Best of UB40 – Volume One
1988	"Breakfast in Bed" (with Chrissie Hynde)	UB40
1988	"Where Did I Go Wrong"	UB40
1988	"Come Out to Play"	UB40
1988	"I Would Do for You"	UB40
1989	"Wedding Day"	Labour of Love II
1989	"Kingston Town"	Labour of Love II
1989	"Baby"	Labour of Love II
1989	"Wear You to the Ball"	Labour of Love II
1989	"Homely Girl"	Labour of Love II
1989	"Just Another Girl"	Labour of Love II
1989	"Stick by Me"	Labour of Love II
1989	"Groovin'"	Labour of Love II
1989	"Tears from My Eyes"	Labour of Love II
1989	"Here I Am (Come and Take Me)"	Labour of Love II
1989	"Sweet Cherie"	Labour of Love II
1989	"Impossible Love" (Version 1)	Labour of Love II
1989	"The Way You Do the Things You Do"	Labour of Love II
1989	"Singer Man"	Labour of Love II
1990	"Impossible Love" (Version 2)	Labour of Love II
1993	"(I Can't Help) Falling in Love with You"	Promises and Lies
1993	"Higher Ground"	Promises and Lies
1993	"Bring Me Your Cup"	Promises and Lies
1994	"C'est la vie"	Promises and Lies
1994	"Reggae Music"	Promises and Lies
1995	"Until My Dying Day"	The Best of UB40 – Volume Two
1995	"Superstition"	The Best of UB40 – Volume Two
1997	"Tell Me Is It True"	Speed 2: Cruise Control soundtrack
1997	"Always There"	Guns in the Ghetto
1998	"Come Back Darling"	Labour of Love III
1998	"Holly Holy"	Labour of Love III
1999	"The Train Is Coming"	Labour of Love III
2000	"Light My Fire"	The Very Best of UB40
2001	"Since I Met You Lady"	Cover Up
2001	"Cover Up" (original and with Nuttea)	Cover Up
2003	"Swing Low" (with United Colours of Sound)	Homegrown
2005	"Kiss and Say Goodbye"	Who You Fighting For?
2005	"Reasons" (with Hunterz and Dhol Blasters)	Who You Fighting For?
2005	"Bling Bling"	Who You Fighting For?
2005	"Sins of the Fathers"	Who You Fighting For?
2008	"Dance Until the Morning Light" (with Maxi Priest)	TwentyFourSeven
2010	"Oh America" (with One Love & Rasta Don of Arrested Development)	TwentyFourSeven
2013	"Midnight Rider"	Getting Over the Storm
2013	"Blue Eyes Crying in the Rain"	Getting Over the Storm
2018	"Midnight Lover" (with Gilly G)	For the Many
2018	"You Haven't Called"	For the Many
2021	"Message of Love" (with House of Shem)	Bigga Baggariddim
2021	"You Don't Call Anymore" (with KIOKO)	Bigga Baggariddim
2021	"Roots Rock Reggae" (with General Zooz)	Bigga Baggariddim
2021	"Rebel Love" (with Inner Circle) (lyric video)	Bigga Baggariddim
2022	"Show and Prove" (with Leno Banton)	Bigga Baggariddim
2022	"Gravy Train Is Coming" (with Blvk H3ro)	Bigga Baggariddim
2022	"Champion" (with Gilly G)	non-album
2024	"Gimme Some Kinda Sign" (with Gilly G)	UB45
2024	"Home"	UB45
2024	"Forever True"	UB45 (BCFC Special Edition)
2024	"Red Red Wine" (re-recorded)	UB45
2025	"Tyler" (re-recorded)	UB45
2025	"Say Nothing"	UB45
2025	"Food for Thought" (re-recorded)	UB45
2025	"Fool Me Once"	UB45
2025	"King" (re-recorded)	UB45
2025	"Cherry Oh Baby" (re-recorded)	UB45
2025	"Sing Our Own Song" (re-recorded)	UB45
2025	"Kingston Town" (re-recorded)	UB45

=== Collaborations in music videos ===
Year	Title	Other Performer	Album
1988	"Reckless"	Afrika Bambaataa	The Light
1990	"I'll Be Your Baby Tonight"	Robert Palmer	Don't Explain
1992	"One in Ten" (remix)	808 State	Gorgeous
