= Greatest Hits (UB40 album) =

Greatest hits album by UB40
- Released: 30 September 2008
- Recorded: 1980–2003
- Genre: Reggae, rock
- Length: 1:15:34
- Label: Virgin Records
- Producer: Ray Falconer, Bob Lamb, UB40, Howard Gray, Dan Armstrong, Danny Canaan

UB40 chronology
TwentyFourSeven' (2008)	Greatest Hits (2008)	Love Songs (2009)

Greatest Hits is a compilation album by English reggae group UB40, released in 2008. The album includes all 21 tracks from 11 studio albums and the compilation The Best of UB40: Volume Two.

== Reception ==
Professional ratings
Review scores
Source	Rating
AllMusic	4/5 stars

David Jeffries from AllMusic says the two sides of UB40's career is represented in Greatest Hits from "the ultra-slick, easy to swallow side of the band" with tracks like "(I Can't Help) Falling in Love with You" mixed in with "the underdog with roots reggae attitude and dubby production" numbers like "One in Ten". He calls it a "one-disc, nonjudgmental document of UB40 done right."

== Track listing ==
No.	Title	Writer(s)	Album	Length
1.	"(I Can't) Help Falling in Love with You"	George Weiss, Hugo Peretti, Luigi Creatore	Promises and Lies, 1993	3:26
2.	"One In Ten"	UB40	Present Arms, 1980	4:33
3.	"Red Red Wine"	Neil Diamond	Labour of Love, 1983	3:04
4.	"If It Happens Again"	UB40	Geffery Morgan, 1984	3:43
5.	"Here I Am (Come and Take Me)"	Al Green, Teenie Hodges	Labour of Love II, 1989	4:04
6.	"Sing Our Own Song"	UB40	Rat in the Kitchen, 1986	4:00
7.	"I Got You Babe" (featuring Chrissie Hynde)	Sonny Bono	Baggariddim, 1985	3:09
8.	"Groovin' (Out On Life)"	Byron Lee	Labour of Love II, 1989	3:41
9.	"My Way Of Thinking"	UB40	Signing Off, 1980	3:23
10.	"The Way You Do the Things You Do"	Smokey Robinson, Robert Rogers	Labour of Love II, 1989	3:02
11.	"Higher Ground"	UB40	Promises and Lies, 1993	4:21
12.	"Please Don't Make Me Cry"	Winston Groovy	Labour of Love, 1983	3:26
13.	"Kingston Town"	Kentrick Patrick	Labour of Love II, 1989	3:50
14.	"Come Back Darling"	Johnny Osbourne	Labour of Love III, 1998	3:28
15.	"Don't Break My Heart"	UB40	Baggariddim, 1985	3:50
16.	"Cherry Oh Baby"	Eric Donaldson	Labour of Love, 1983	3:17
17.	"Breakfast in Bed" (featuring Chrissie Hynde)	Eddie Hinton, Donnie Fritts	UB40, 1988	3:20
18.	"Rat in Mi Kitchen"	UB40	Rat in the Kitchen, 1986	3:06
19.	"Homely Girl"	Eugene Record, Stan McKenny	Labour of Love II, 1989	3:25
20.	"Until My Dying Day"	UB40	The Best of UB40 – Volume Two, 1995	3:53
21.	"Swing Low" (featuring The United Colours Of Sound)	Charlie Skarbek, Wallace Willis	Homegrown, 2003	3:26
Total length:				1:15:34

== Personnel ==
- Ali Campbell - guitar, vocals
- Mickey Virtue - keyboards
- Astro - percussion, trumpet, vocals
- Jimmy Brown - drums
- Robin Campbell - guitar, vocals
- Earl Falconer - bass guitar
- Brian Travers - saxophone
- Chrissie Hynde - Vocals (I Got You, Babe and Breakfast In Bed)

Production

- Dan Armstrong - Producer
- Danny Canaan - Producer
- Frank Collura - Compilation Producer
- Ray Falconer - Producer
- Howard Gray - Producer
- Susan Lavoie - Art Direction
- Sam Nelson - Compilation Producer
- Gerry Parchment - Producer
- Will Ragland - Design
- Charlie Skarbek - Producer

== Release history ==
Country	Date	Label	Format	Catalog
United States	2008	Virgin Records	CD	509992/ 37509 20
