= The Very Best of UB40 =

The Very Best of UB40 1980–2000

Greatest hits album by UB40
- Released: 2000
- Recorded: 1980–2000
- Genre: Reggae
- Label: Virgin

UB40 chronology
Labour of Love III (1998)	The Very Best of UB40 1980–2000 (2000)	The Very Best of UB40 (2000)

The Very Best of UB40 1980–2000 is a greatest hits album of the British dub/reggae band UB40.

There is another, later release with the similar title The Best of UB40 Volume I & II, with different contents.

== Track listing ==
=== UK version ===
1. "One in Ten" from Present Arms
2. "Red Red Wine" from Labour of Love
3. "Kingston Town" from Labour of Love II
4. "Higher Ground" from Promises and Lies
5. "King" from Signing Off
6. "Cherry Oh Baby" from Labour of Love
7. "I Got You Babe" from Baggariddim
8. "Come Back Darling" from Labour of Love III
9. "The Earth Dies Screaming" Single release
10. "If It Happens Again" from Geffery Morgan
11. "Don't Break My Heart" from Baggariddim
12. "(I Can't Help) Falling in Love with You" from Promises and Lies
13. "Watchdogs" from Rat in the Kitchen
14. "Tell Me Is It True" from Guns in the Ghetto
15. "Rat in Mi Kitchen" from Rat in the Kitchen
16. "Homely Girl" from Labour of Love II
17. "Light My Fire" Single release
18. "Bring Me Your Cup" from Promises and Lies
19. "Food for Thought" from Signing Off
20. "Sing Our Own Song" from Rat in the Kitchen

=== US version ===
1. "I Got You Babe"
2. "Here I Am (Come and Take Me)"
3. "Bring Me Your Cup" (7 inch Version)
4. "One in Ten"
5. "Red Red Wine"
6. "Kingston Town"
7. "If It Happens Again"
8. "Don't Break My Heart"
9. "Cherry Oh Baby"
10. "Can't Help Falling in Love"
11. "Higher Ground"
12. "Tell Me Is It True"
13. "Rat in Mi Kitchen"
14. "Until My Dying Day"
15. "The Way You Do the Things You Do"
16. "Light My Fire"
17. "Food for Thought"
18. "Sing Our Own Song"

== Charts ==
=== Weekly charts ===
Chart (2000–2014)	Peak position
Australian Albums (ARIA)	134
Belgian Albums (Ultratop Flanders)	10
Danish Albums (Hitlisten)	2
Dutch Albums (Album Top 100)	8
French Albums (SNEP)	180
Irish Albums (IRMA)	14
New Zealand Albums (RMNZ)	4
Norwegian Albums (VG-lista)	2
Scottish Albums (Official Charts)	26
Swedish Albums (Sverigetopplistan)	4
UK Albums (Official Charts)	7

=== Year-end charts ===
Chart (2000)	Position
Belgian Albums (Ultratop Flanders)	85
Dutch Albums (Album Top 100)	62
UK Albums (OCC)	37

Chart (2001)	Position
Dutch Albums (Album Top 100)	38
Swedish Albums (Sverigetopplistan)	79
UK Albums (OCC)	159

== Certifications ==
Region	Certification	Certified units/sales
Denmark (IFPI Danmark)	Gold	25,000^{^}
Netherlands (NVPI)	Platinum	80,000^{^}
New Zealand (RMNZ)	5× Platinum	75,000^{^}
United Kingdom (BPI)	4× Platinum	1,200,000^{‡}
Summaries
Europe (IFPI)	Platinum	1,000,000^{*}
^{*} Sales figures based on certification alone.^{^} Shipments figures based on certification alone.^{‡} Sales+streaming figures based on certification alone.
