= The Best of UB40 – Volume One =

Greatest hits album by UB40
- Released: 26 October 1987
- Recorded: 1980–1987
- Genre: Reggae
- Length: 57:22
- Label: Virgin

UB40 chronology
Rat in the Kitchen (1986)	The Best of UB40 – Volume One (1987)	UB40 (1988)

Singles from The Best of UB40 - Volume One
- 1. "Maybe Tomorrow" Released: 28 September 1987

Professional ratings
Review scores
Source	Rating
AllMusic	4/5 stars
Robert Christgau	(3-star Honorable Mention)

The Best of UB40 – Volume One is a compilation album by the British reggae band UB40. It was released in 1987 and includes a selection of the band's hits from 1980 to 1987.

The pub on the cover of the album is the Eagle and Tun, frequented by UB40 as it is close to their DEP International recording studios in Digbeth, Birmingham. The Best of UB40 – Volume One was re-released in July 1995 along with the release of The Best of UB40 – Volume Two.

== Track listing ==
=== Side 1 ===
1. "Food for Thought" – 4:09 from Signing Off, 1980
2. "King" – 4:35 from Signing Off, 1980
3. "My Way of Thinking" – 4:31 from My Way of Thinking - Single, 1980
4. "One in Ten" – 4:32 from Present Arms, 1981
5. "Red Red Wine" – 5:21 from Labour of Love, 1983
6. "Please Don't Make Me Cry" – 3:26 from Labour of Love, 1983
7. "Many Rivers to Cross – 4:31 from Labour of Love, 1983

=== Side 2 ===
1. "Cherry Oh Baby" – 3:18 from Labour of Love, 1983
2. "If It Happens Again" – 3:44 from Geffery Morgan, 1984
3. "I Got You Babe" – 3:09 from Baggariddim, 1985
4. "Don't Break My Heart" – 3:49 from Baggariddim, 1985
5. "Sing Our Own Song" – 3:59 from Rat in the Kitchen, 1986
6. "Rat in Mi Kitchen" – 6:56 from Rat in the Kitchen, 1986
7. "Maybe Tomorrow" – 3:23 from Maybe Tomorrow - Single, 1987

=== CD version ===
1. "Food for Thought" – 4:11 from Signing Off, 1980
2. "King" – 4:34 from Signing Off, 1980
3. "My Way of Thinking" – 3:24 from My Way of Thinking - Single, 1980
4. "The Earth Dies Screaming" – 4:38 from The Earth Dies Screaming - Single, 1980
5. "Dream a Lie" – 3:38 from The Earth Dies Screaming - Single, 1980
6. "Don't Let It Pass You By" – 7:45 from Present Arms, 1981
7. "Don't Slow Down" – 4:28 from Present Arms, 1981
8. "One in Ten" – 4:32 from Present Arms, 1981
9. "Red Red Wine" – 3:03 from Labour of Love, 1983
10. "Please Don't Make Me Cry" – 3:26 from Labour of Love, 1983
11. "Many Rivers To Cross" – 4:31 from Labour of Love, 1983
12. "Cherry Oh Baby" – 3:18 from Labour of Love, 1983
13. "If It Happens Again" – 3:44 from Geffery Morgan, 1984
14. "I Got You Babe" – 3:09 from Baggariddim, 1985
15. "Don't Break My Heart" – 3:49 from Baggariddim, 1985
16. "Sing Our Own Song" – 4:08 from Rat in the Kitchen, 1986
17. "Rat in Mi Kitchen" – 3:08 from Rat in the Kitchen, 1986
18. "Maybe Tomorrow" – 3:23 from Maybe Tomorrow - Single, 1987

Note

- "I Got You Babe" features Chrissie Hynde.

== Charts ==
=== Weekly charts ===
Chart (1987–90)	Peak position
Australian Albums (ARIA)	18
Dutch Albums (Album Top 100)	1
German Albums (Offizielle Top 100)	52
New Zealand Albums (RMNZ)	3
UK Albums (Official Charts)	3

=== Year-end charts ===
Chart (1987)	Position
Dutch Albums (Album Top 100)	43
New Zealand Albums (RMNZ)	47

== Certifications ==
Region	Certification	Certified units/sales
Argentina (CAPIF)	Platinum	60,000^{^}
Australia (ARIA)	Platinum	70,000^{^}
France (SNEP)	2× Gold	200,000^{*}
Germany (BVMI)	Gold	250,000^{^}
Netherlands (NVPI)	Platinum	100,000^{^}
New Zealand (RMNZ)	Platinum	15,000^{^}
Sweden (GLF)	Gold	50,000^{^}
United Kingdom (BPI)	6× Platinum	1,800,000^{^}
^{*} Sales figures based on certification alone.^{^} Shipments figures based on certification alone.
