= Kingston Town (song) =

1970 single by Lord Creator

Single by Lord Creator
- B-side: "Holly Holly" (by The Fabulous Flames)
- Released: 1970
- Genre: Reggae
- Label: Clandisc
- Songwriter: Kentrick Patrick
- Producer: Clancy Eccles

"Kingston Town" is a 1970 song by Lord Creator about Kingston, Jamaica, released as a single on producer Clancy Eccles' Clandisc label. It was also recorded in 1989 by reggae group UB40 and was released as the second single from their album Labour of Love II, reaching number four on the UK Singles Chart and number one in France and the Netherlands.

In June 2007, the copyright holders of the song, Sparta Florida Music Group, started legal action against Paris Hilton and Warner Chappell Music for plagiarism due to alleged similarities between "Kingston Town" and Hilton's song "Stars Are Blind". It was wrongly stated that UB40 was the suing party, which the band later confirmed as being incorrect on their website.

== UB40 version ==
"Kingston Town"

Single by UB40

from the album Labour of Love II
- B-side: "Lickwood"
- Released: 19 March 1990
- Genre: Reggae
- Length: 3:52
- Label: DEP International, Virgin
- Songwriter: Kentrick Patrick
- Producer: UB40

UB40 singles chronology
"Homely Girl" (1989)	"Kingston Town" (1990)	"Wear You to the Ball" (1990)

English reggae band UB40 covered "Kingston Town" in 1989 and released it as a single in March 1990. It became the group's sixth top-five hit on the UK Singles Chart, peaking at number four for three weeks in April 1990. Throughout the rest of 1990, the song charted in a number of countries, topping the Dutch Top 40 for two weeks in May and the French Singles Chart for three weeks in October and November.

In Australia, the song did not reach the top 100 on the ARIA Singles Chart during its original release. In 1991, after a re-release of "Here I Am (Come and Take Me)" reached number three, "Kingston Town" was re-issued and peaked at number 17 on the ARIA Singles Chart. In the United States, the song was serviced to rhythmic contemporary radio on 17 October 1995, in tandem with The Best of UB40 – Volume Two, but it failed to chart.

=== Critical reception ===
David Giles of Music Week described "Kingston Town" as a "pleasant but perfunctory cover" less commercial than UB40's previous two singles, and deemed it was likely not to be a hit.

=== Track listings ===
7-inch single

A. "Kingston Town"
B. "Lickwood"

12-inch single

A1. "Kingston Town" (extended mix)
B1. "Lickwood"
B2. "Kingston Town" (7-inch version)

CD single

1. "Kingston Town" (7-inch version)
2. "Lickwood"
3. "Kingston Town" (extended mix)

US CD and cassette single

1. "Kingston Town" – 3:46
2. "Superstition" – 5:18

Australian CD single (1991)

1. "Kingston Town" – 3:49
2. "Breakfast in Bed" – 3:15
3. "If It Happens Again" – 3:42
4. "Sing Our Own Song" – 4:05

=== Charts ===
==== Weekly charts ====
Chart (1990)	Peak position
Austria (Ö3 Austria Top 40)	5
Belgium (Ultratop 50 Flanders)	4
Europe (Eurochart Hot 100)	6
France (SNEP)	1
Ireland (IRMA)	8
Luxembourg (Radio Luxembourg)	5
Netherlands (Dutch Top 40)	1
Netherlands (Single Top 100)	2
New Zealand (Recorded Music NZ)	17
Sweden (Sverigetopplistan)	14
Switzerland (Schweizer Hitparade)	8
UK Singles (Official Charts)	4
West Germany (GfK)	5

Chart (1992)	Peak position
Australia (ARIA)	17

==== Year-end charts ====
Chart (1990)	Position
Austria (Ö3 Austria Top 40)	11
Belgium (Ultratop)	22
Europe (Eurochart Hot 100)	6
Europe (European Airplay Top 50)	1
Europe (European Hit Radio)	1
Germany (Media Control)	8
Netherlands (Dutch Top 40)	12
Netherlands (Single Top 100)	11
Sweden (Topplistan)	62
UK Singles (OCC)	35

==== Decade-end charts ====
Chart (1990–1999)	Rank
Austria (Ö3 Austria Top 40)	69

=== Certifications and sales ===
Region	Certification	Certified units/sales
Australia (ARIA)	Gold	35,000^{^}
France (SNEP)	Gold	400,000^{*}
Germany (BVMI)	Gold	250,000^{^}
New Zealand (RMNZ)	4× Platinum	120,000^{‡}
United Kingdom (BPI)	Platinum	600,000^{‡}
^{*} Sales figures based on certification alone.^{^} Shipments figures based on certification alone.^{‡} Sales+streaming figures based on certification alone.

=== Release history ===
Region	Date	Format(s)	Label(s)	Ref.
United Kingdom	19 March 1990	—N/a	DEP International; Virgin	
Australia	21 May 1990	7-inch vinyl; 12-inch vinyl; cassette	DEP International; Virgin	
Australia (re-release)	28 October 1991	CD; cassette	Virgin	
