= Cover Up (UB40 album) =

Studio album by UB40
- Released: 22 October 2001
- Studio: DEP International Studios, Birmingham
- Genre: Reggae; pop reggae
- Length: 60:14
- Label: Virgin; DEP International
- Producer: UB40; Gerry Parchment

UB40 chronology
The Very Best of UB40 (2000)	Cover Up (2001)	The Fathers of Reggae (2002)

Singles from Cover Up
- 1. "Since I Met You Lady" Released: October 2001; 2. "Cover Up" Released: 18 February 2002

Cover Up is the fourteenth (Note: This ordering includes the group's collaboration album The Dancehall Album (1998).) studio album by English reggae band UB40, released on 22 October 2001 through Virgin Records and DEP International. Recorded with co-producer Gerry Parchment at DEP International Studios in Birmingham, the album followed a musical break for the group. It exemplifies their distinct reggae/pop sound and uses programmed rhythms as the basis for songs; the incorporation of the latter caused friction within the band and singer Ali Campbell later criticised the production style.

On release, Cover Up reached number 29 on the UK Albums Chart and left the chart after three weeks, reflecting the group's diminishing profile. The lead single, "Since I Met You Lady", was a collaboration with dancehall singer Lady Saw. The song was shunned by BBC Radio 1, a decision criticised by Campbell, and reached number 40 on the UK Singles Chart. The second single, "Cover Up", reached number 54 and concerns AIDS prevention. In late 2001, following a charity concert at the National Exhibition Centre in Birmingham that commemorated the group's 21st anniversary, UB40 continued the celebration with The Cover Up Tour. The group also played several politicised shows in South Africa.

== Recording and composition ==
Cover Up marked UB40's return following an extended break, which had been punctuated by the release of The Very Best of UB40 (2000), a retrospective of the group's 20-year career up to that point. Produced by the group and Gerry Parchment, the album was recorded at DEP International Studios in Birmingham, with strings recorded at Angel Recording Studios in London.

The album was the first of two by UB40 – alongside its follow-up, Homegrown (2003) – to use computer-generated rhythms as the foundation for its tracks. According to band members Ali and Robin Campbell, this idea was insisted on by bandmates Jimmy Brown and Earl Falconer. Ali believed that this made both albums sound uninspired and later commented that UB40 "had finally stopped recording as a band and that had an impact on the sound." He regretted that differences in ego between band members disrupted the recording and believed that both records "suffered from our approach not just to production but actually recording. Our music is organic and has to be treated as such". He commented that the group discovered that songs on both of the "heavily programmed albums" sounded far better after they had repeatedly played them live, because "we settled into the songs, shifted them around and let them breath".

According to reviewer David Cheal, Cover Up is a typical UB40 album in that it explores "the narrow spectrum of sounds, from reggae to ragga via dancehall, that has served them so well". The songs are all variants on the group's "patented reggae/pop sound". "Sparkle of My Eyes" is a melodic song in the style of Sugar Minott, while "Since I Met You Lady" is a collaboration with dancehall singer Lady Saw. As described by Martin C. Strong, the title track refers to AIDS prevention, rather than "an indication of a covers set." The song was recorded in support of UNAIDS, the United Nations' campaign for global action on the AIDS pandemic. According to Ali and Robin, the song is "not only about wearing a condom to protect yourself from infection, but also about the fact that the Aids problem is all too often swept up under the carpet. This is a global epidemic of massive proportions and we felt that we had to let people know that essentially it comes down to economics. The people have been lied to, which is the biggest cover-up of all." It has been described as "prophylactic-proselytising". Some tracks have been described as "surprises", including "Something More Than This", which has been compared to the music of Roni Size, and the gritty "Write Off the Debt", which saw UB40 return to the political focus of their early work.

== Release and promotion ==
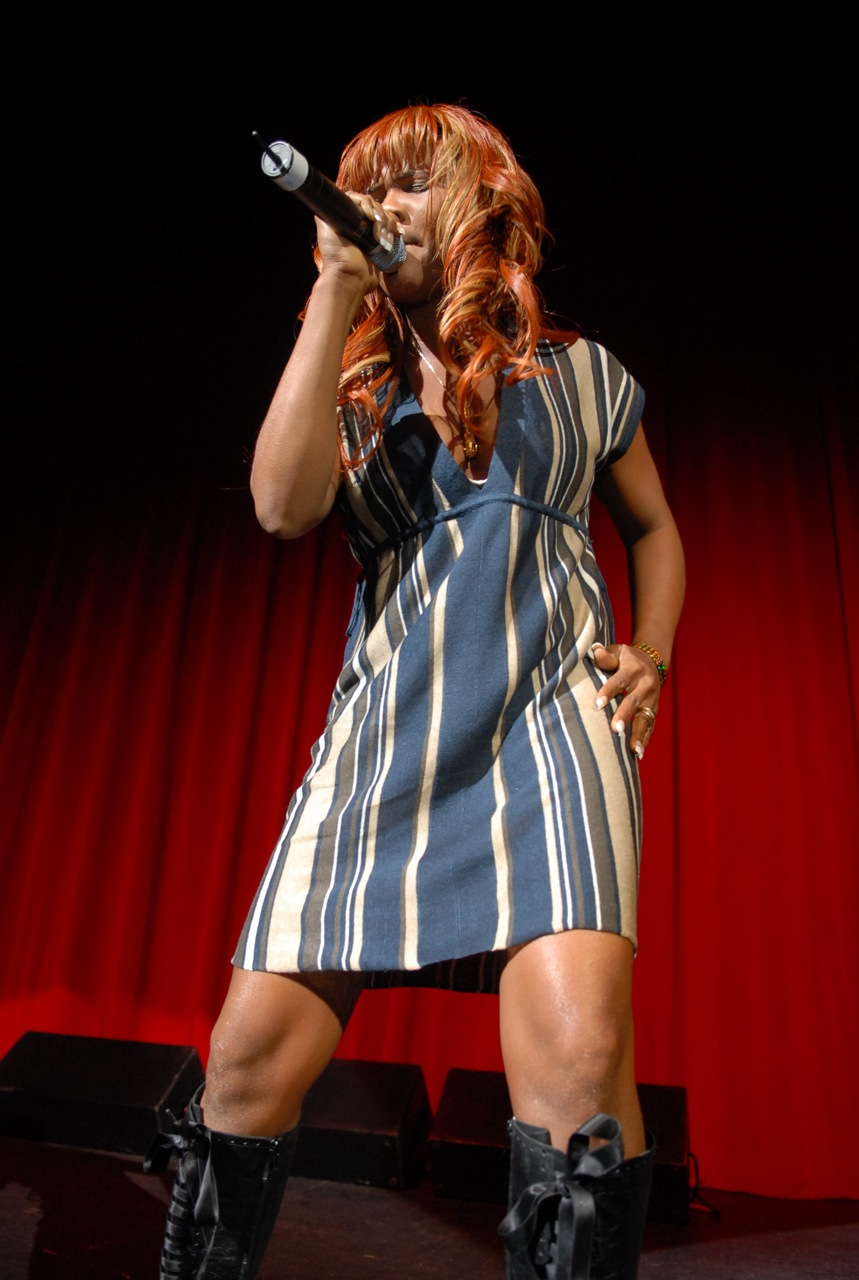
Lead single "Since I Met You Lady" features guest vocals from Lady Saw (pictured).

Cover Up was released on 22 October 2001 through Virgin Records. It debuted and peaked at number 29 on the UK Albums Chart, and dropped off after three weeks, which Vulture writer Larry Filtzmaurice felt was evidence of UB40's diminishing profile. The album's first single, the Lady Saw collaboration "Since I Met You Lady", was released in October 2001, and spent two weeks on the UK Singles Chart, peaking at number 40. Neither of the two songs on the single release are originals, which was used by John Aizlewood of The Guardian as evidence of the group's heavy reliance on cover versions. He added: "They did at least write the title track [of Cover Up]; its line about 'sitting in the shade of my family tree' serves only to inspire hopes that they might deploy their songwriting more regularly."

According to journalist Andrew Perry, airplay of the group had become increasingly grudging over the decades, which reached a nadir when the "excellent" lead single was shunned by BBC Radio 1. Ali said that the station told him they "weren't playing that kind of thing"; this, Perry wrote, was despite fellow reggae singer Shaggy being popular on their playlists. Ali criticised the decision, saying: "So, what's the point in trying to consciously trying to make something that will be palatable to the radio people?" Ali later commented that although Radio 1 ignored Lady Saw, they embraced her hit single with No Doubt, "Underneath It All" (2002), several months later. The record's second single was "Cover Up". Released on 18 February 2002, it was C-listed by BBC Radio 2, and reached number 54 on the UK chart.

=== Touring ===
On 13 September 2001, UB40 headlined the National Exhibition Centre (NEC) in their home city of Birmingham for the fourteenth time. The concert was for launching the album, commemorating their 21st anniversary as a band, and raising money for the United Nations' HIV/AIDS charity efforts in Botswana. The group played an array of new songs and appeared with numerous guest stars, including Lenny Henry as MC. The band used the show to warm up for (and preview) their extensive European tour, which began in Belgium on 22 October. Named The Cover Up Tour, it acted as the group's 21st anniversary celebration and featured support from the Pretenders. The tour's first British date was in Manchester on 28 October. A DVD of the NEC show, entitled UB40: The Collection, was released.

The group also played several shows in South Africa during the period, where they adapted the album's title track into a protest against how, according to Ali and Robin, president Thabo Mbeki and his government's ongoing practice of HIV/AIDS denialism had led to widespread infection and the loss of over five million lives. These dates were played with Afro-pop musician Ringo Madlingozi, who also released his own version of the song in collaboration with the group. The opening concert at Cape Town was dedicated to the country's recently deceased child AIDS victim Nkosi Johnson; the group also appeared in a South African television advertisement encouraging safe sex.

== Critical reception ==
Professional ratings
Review scores
Source	Rating
AllMusic	3/5 stars
The Encyclopedia of Popular Music	3/5 stars
The Great Rock Discography	5/10

David Cheal of The Daily Telegraph wrote that while, as a reggae band, UB40's lack of radical change in direction is understandable and should not be held against them, he found Cover Up to be largely lacklustre and unmemorable, adding: "It has moments, but they are far too few and much too far between." He highlighted three "singalong" songs as positives but wrote that otherwise, the album is "inoffensive, lightweight and eminently skippable." Sunday Life reviewer Neil McKay wrote that UB40 had been constantly "oblivious to fashion and fads" and, thus, Cover Up eschews "surprises or radical new directions" for variations on the group's reggae/pop style. He commented: "It's hard to dislike, and fans will lap it up, but at an hour long and without any really memorable songs, this time they have slipped just too far into the comfort zone".

In her review for The Telegraph & Argus, Lucy Quinton wrote that although UB40 create "great pop-reggae", Cover Up arrived at a time "when the autumn leaves appear to be falling on the band's career", and this explains why the album, while easily showcasing the group's sound, dispenses with the pop hooks of their biggest hits. She added that this was "no bad thing", noting several surprises on the record and commenting: "UB40 may not be troubling the upper reaches of the chart right now, but they carry on with their dignity firmly intact." In The Rough Guide to Rock (2003), Matthew Grant considered Cover Up to be as "equally lacklustre" as the group's preceding albums Guns in the Ghetto (1997) and Labour of Love III (1998).

== Track listing ==
All tracks composed by UB40; except where indicated

1. "Rudie" – 4:25
2. "Sparkle of My Eyes" (Garth Evans) – 4:12
3. "Really" – 4:13
4. "The Day I Broke the Law" – 3:27
5. "Let Me Know" – 4:17
6. "Cover Up" – 3:56
7. "Walk on Me Land" – 5:40
8. "Something More Than This" – 4:43
9. "Everytime" – 3:27
10. "I'm on the Up" – 3:13
11. "Look at Me" – 4:16
12. "Since I Met You Lady" (featuring Lady Saw) (Ivory Joe Hunter) – 3:13
13. "Walked in the Rain" – 5:57
14. "Write off the Debt" – 5:04

== Personnel ==
Adapted from the liner notes of Cover Up.

UB40

- UB40 – production, mixing, programming, design
- Ali Campbell – vocals, guitar
- Astro – vocals
- Brian Travers – saxophones, horn arrangements
- Earl Falconer – bass, vocals, keyboards
- James "Jimmy" Brown – drums
- Michael Virtue – keyboards
- Norman Lamont Hussan – percussion, vocals
- Robin Campbell – guitar, vocals

Other

- Gerry Parchment – production, mixing, programming
- Andrew Griffiths – mixing, programming, additional keyboards, additional keyboard programming
- Laurence Parry – trumpet, flugelhorn, trombone
- Martin Meredith – alto saxophone
- Lady Saw – additional vocals ("Since I Met You Lady")
- Huw Williams – additional programming
- Dan Sprigg – ProTools engineering
- London Session Orchestra – additional strings ("Really", "Let Me Know", "Walk on Me Land", "Look at Me" and "Since I Met You Lady")
- Wil Malone – arranging and conduction ("Really", "Let Me Know", "Walk on Me Land", "Look at Me" and "Since I Met You Lady")
- Ian Cooper – mastering
- Andy Earl – photography
- Gillian Lever – paintings
- John Whybrow Ltd. – painting photography
- BSS – design
- Stewart Young – management

== Charts ==
Weekly chart performance for Cover Up
Chart (2001)	Peak position
German Albums (Offizielle Top 100)	84
Dutch Albums (Album Top 100)	18
New Zealand Albums (RMNZ)	22
Scottish Albums (OCC)	67
UK Albums (OCC)	29
