= Homegrown (UB40 album) =

Studio album by UB40
- Released: 3 November 2003
- Studios: DEP International Studios, Birmingham
- Genre: Reggae
- Length: 51:47
- Labels: Virgin; DEP International
- Producers: UB40; Charlie Skarbek

UB40 chronology
The Fathers of Reggae (2002)	Homegrown (2003)	Who You Fighting For? (2005)

Singles from Homegrown
- 1. "Swing Low" Released: 13 October 2003

Homegrown is the sixteenth (Note: This ordering includes the group's collaboration albums The Dancehall Album (1998) and The Fathers of Reggae (2002).) studio album by English reggae band UB40, released on 3 November 2003 through Virgin Records and DEP International. The follow-up to Cover Up (2001), the album was produced by UB40 at DEP International Studios in Birmingham. Described by Robin Campbell as an old-fashioned UB40 record, Homegrown features both love songs and political numbers. As with Cover Up, its use of programmed rhythms was the cause of musical differences in the band and was later criticised by frontman Ali Campbell.

On release, Homegrown reached number 49 on the UK Albums Chart, their lowest charting album to date, and number 16 in the Netherlands. Music critics highlighted the album's darker songs. The album's single, a cover of the traditional spiritual "Swing Low", was recorded as the official anthem of the England national rugby union team's participation in the 2003 Rugby World Cup. After the England's team victory in the World Cup final, it reached number 15 on the UK Singles Chart, providing the album's biggest boost. UB40 toured in promotion of Homegrown in 2003 and released the live DVD Homegrown in Holland in 2004.

== Recording and composition ==
Homegrown was produced by UB40 and recorded at DEP International Studios in Birmingham, with co-production from Charlie Skarbek on one song, and mastered by Tim Young at London's Metropolis Studios. It was the follow-up to Cover Up (2001), although in the intervening time, the group had released UB40 Present the Fathers of Reggae (2002), an album of collaborations. Homegrown includes numerous political songs and several love songs, and was referred to by band member Robin Campbell as an "old-fashioned UB40 album".

As with Cover Up, the tracks on Homegrown incorporate computer-generated rhythms. According to band members Ali and Robin Campbell, this was insisted on by bandmates Jimmy Brown and Earl Falconer. Ali criticises the decision for making the albums sound uninspired and later lamented that UB40 had "stopped recording as a band and that had an impact on the sound." He regretted that band members' ego clashes and musical differences disrupted the recording and believed that both records "suffered from our approach not just to production but actually recording. Our music is organic and has to be treated as such". He contended that the group discovered that songs on both of the "heavily programmed albums" rapidly improved after they had repeatedly played them live, because "we settled into the songs, shifted them around and let them breath".

"I Knew You" was written by Robin about his strained marriage to Sindy, whom he divorced in 2002. He had written several earlier UB40 songs about their marital turmoil, including "Where Did I Go Wrong" (from UB40, 1988) and "Bring Me Your Cup" (from Promises and Lies, 1993). "Just Be Good" is an attack on US President George W. Bush, while "Young Guns" criticises the culture of violence in hip-hop. According to Ali, the latter song "took the gangsta-rap likes of 50 Cent to task for glorifying gun crime. We know for sure that young guns never grow old." The track features echoing, dub-style horns which, combined with its ominous, cautionary lyrics, contribute to the song's "husky, slow groove" being evocative of UB40's older material. The album closes with "Swing Low", an uplifting cover of the traditional spiritual, performed in collaboration with the United Colours of Sound. The song was recorded as the official anthem of the England national rugby union team's participation in the 2003 Rugby World Cup. Other songs include "Freestyler", which features raggamuffin vocals, and a dub remix of "Nothing Without You".

== Release and promotion ==
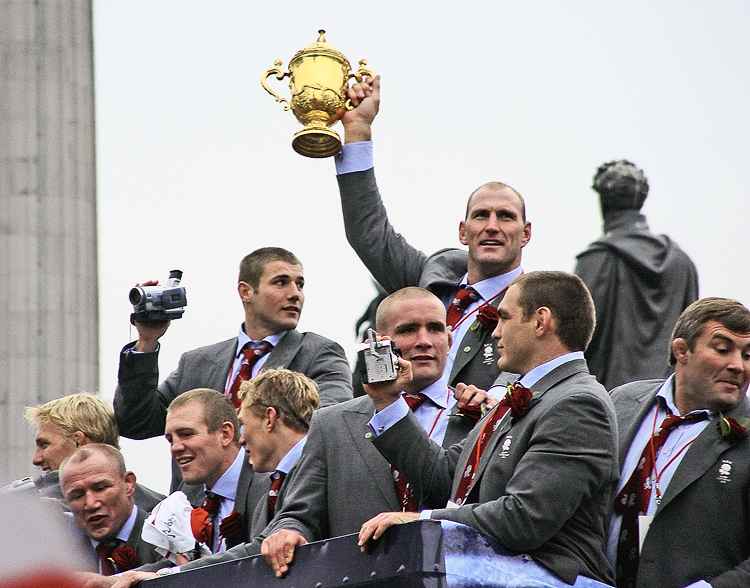
The success of "Swing Low" was bolstered after England's victory at the 2003 Rugby World Cup final (the team's victory parade pictured).

UB40's 22nd album overall, Homegrown was released on 3 November 2003 by Virgin Records. When preparing artwork for the album, the group were told by the label that they could not use a "weed-green" cover, as the cannabis connotation would discourage large retail chains, such as Woolworths, from stocking the record. Ali and Robin commented on this, saying that despite increasingly more lenient attitudes towards marijuana use in society, there is "a huge conservative streak running through big business when it comes to weed." (Note: The pair said that the group had previously "got the same reaction" when proposing to Virgin that they release their 1998 cover of "Legalize It" as a single.) Homegrown debuted and peaked at number 49 on the UK Albums Chart, becoming the band's lowest charter there to date. In the Netherlands, it peaked at number 16 on the Dutch Album Top 100 during a ten-week stay.

The album received its biggest boost when "Swing Low" became an unlikely hit. Released as England's official single for the Rugby World Cup on 13 October 2003, it also featured (as "Swing Low '03") on the tournament's official tie-in album, True Colours: The World in Union. Additionally, UB40 performed the song at London's Twickenham Stadium on 6 September before a match between England and France. Ali credited the television performance with reaching "millions of people". The song entered the UK Singles Chart at number 23, but following England's victory at the World Cup final, it reached a new peaked of number 15, in what became the ninth of fourteen weeks on the chart. Vulture contributor Larry Filtzmaurice wrote that, following several relatively unsuccessful releases, the success of the song disrupted UB40's increasingly diminishing international profile.

UB40 toured in promotion of Homegrown in 2003. This included gigs at Brighton Centre on 30 November, and two sold-out nights at Wembley Arena, London, on 3 and 4 December, all with support from the Stranglers. On 14 September 2004, the band released Homegrown in Holland, a live DVD recorded when the tour visited a Dutch arena of 30,000 fans; the release features five songs from Homegrown, played between lengthier sequences of hits. In a review of the DVD, Hal Horowitz noted the concert's "glossy presentation".

== Critical reception and legacy ==
Professional ratings
Review scores
Source	Rating
AllMusic	2.5/5 stars
The Encyclopedia of Popular Music	3/5 stars
The Great Rock Discography	4/10

In his review for AllMusic, David Jeffries wrote that Homegrown was a "slight return to form for UB40" after several bland, disappointing albums, adding that although not as "edgy and organic as longtime fans may have hoped", it contains great songs and avoids the group's "limp adult contemporary tendencies." He particularly praised the energy of the political songs, believing that even more energy and less filler would have made the album comparable to Rat in the Kitchen (1986), concluding that "Homegrown at least points UB40 in the right direction while adding some worthwhile material to the band's repertoire." A concert reviewer for The Sydney Morning Herald was unimpressed with the album's darker material.

In The Great Rock Discography (2006), Martin C. Strong believed that Homegrown was notable mostly for "Swing Low", the band's "highly unlikely contribution" to England's Rugby World Cup campaign, but added that there were "hints at the brooding brilliance of old", such as on "Young Guns" and its attack on violence in hip-hop culture. UB40's next album, Who You Fighting For? (2005), featured a more "organic" production in reaction to Cover Up and Homegrown.

== Track listing ==
All tracks composed by UB40; except where noted.

1. "So Destructive" – 5:15
2. "I Knew You" – 4:33
3. "Drop on By" – 4:25
4. "Someone Like Me" – 3:10
5. "Freestyler" – 5:13
6. "Everything Is Better Now" – 5:00
7. "Just Be Good" (Bushman Dub) – 5:00
8. "Young Guns" – 4:21
9. "Hand That Rocks The Cradle" – 4:10
10. "Nothing Without You" – 3:54
11. "Nothing Without You" (Dub) – 3:09
12. "Swing Low" (featuring United Colours of Sound) (traditional, Charlie Skarbek) (bonus track) – 3:29

== Personnel ==
Adapted from the liner notes of Homegrown.

- UB40 – production, mixing (tracks 3 and 12)
- Brian Travers – horn arrangements
- Jamie Travers – engineering, programming, additional keyboards, mixing (tracks 3, 11), additional mixing (tracks 1–11)
- Charlie Skarbek – co-production (track 12), arranging (track 12)
- Dan Sprigg – digital editing, mixing (track 3)
- Martin Meredith – alto saxophone
- Laurence Parry – trumpet, flugelhorn, trombone
- Rick Blaskey – executive producer (track 12)
- Neil Perch – mixing (tracks 1, 3–11)
- Austen Kilburn – mixing (track 12)
- United Colours of Sound – vocals (track 12)
- Tim Young – mastering

== Charts ==
Weekly chart performance for Homegrown
Chart (2003)	Peak position
Dutch Albums (Album Top 100)	16
UK Albums (Official Charts)	49
