= Present Arms =

Present Arms may refer to:

- Present Arms (album) by UB40, 1981
  - Present Arms in Dub, a remix version, 1981
- "Present Arms" (Dad's Army radio episode), 1974
- Present Arms (musical), a 1928 Broadway musical comedy
- Present arms (command), a military drill command
