= Toyi-toyi =

Type of dance

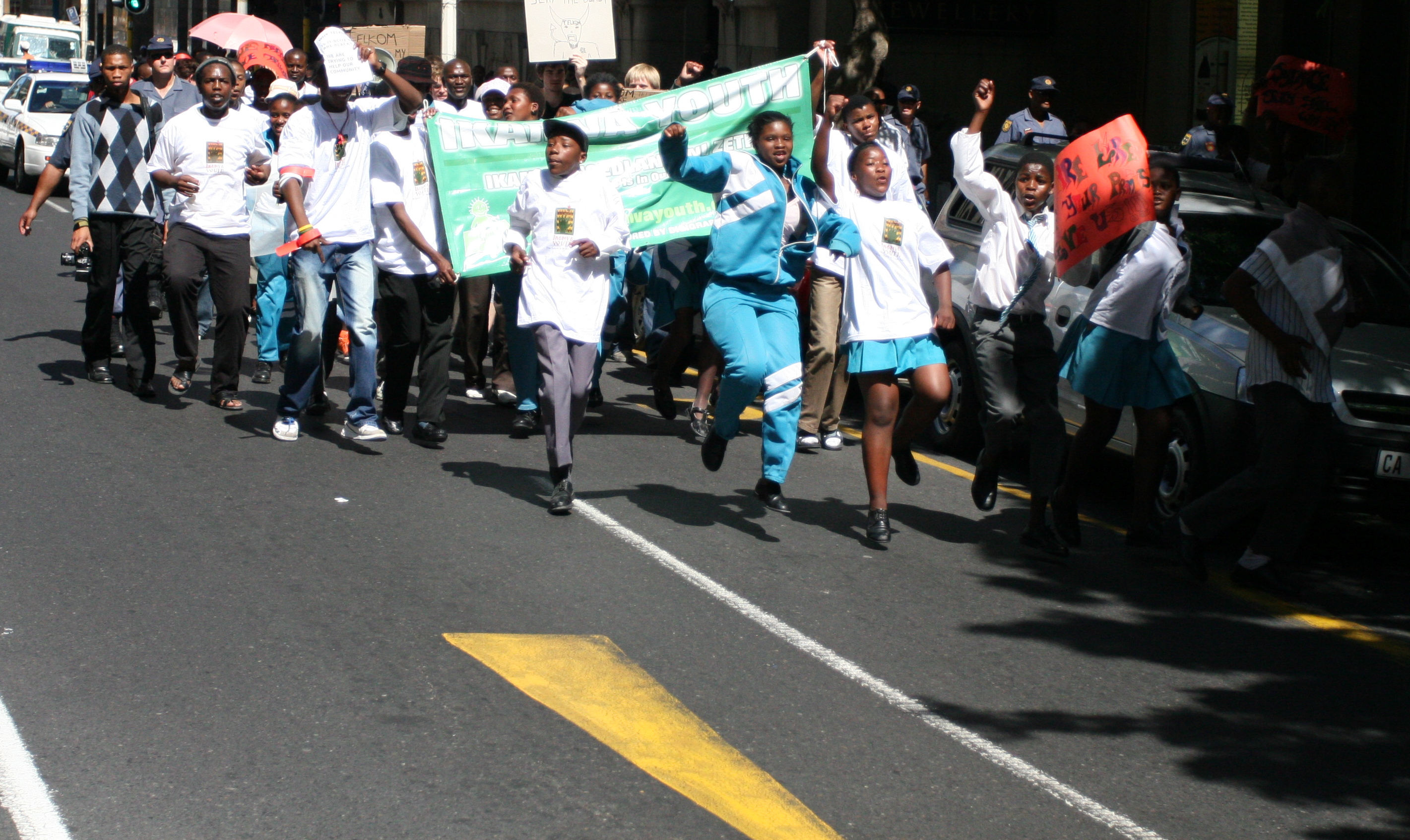
Toyi-toyi in South Africa 2007

Toyi-toyi is a Southern African dance used in political protests in South Africa.

Toyi-toyi could begin as the stomping of feet and spontaneous chanting during protests that could include political slogans or songs, either improvised or previously created.

== Use during Apartheid ==
South African flag during Apartheid South African Flag

Toyi-toyi was often used for intimidating the South African police and security forces during anti-apartheid demonstrations. The toyi-toyi was also used with chants such as the African National Congress's "Amandla" ("power") and "Awethu" ("ours") or the Pan African Congress's "One Settler, One Bullet".

After the 1976 Soweto massacre, the anti-apartheid movement became more militant. The toyi-toyi, a military march dance and song style became commonplace in massive street demonstrations. As one activist puts it, "The toyi-toyi was our weapon. We did not have the technology of warfare, the tear gas and tanks, but we had this weapon."

== Current use in South Africa ==
After Apartheid ended, people have used toyi-toyi to express their grievances against current government policies. Use of the dance has become very popular during service delivery protests and among trade unions. The Anti-Privatisation Forum has come out with a CD that they see as a compilation of music specially for toyi-toying.

== General ==
The UK band, UB40, incorporated the "Amandla, Awethu" chant into Sing Our Own Song from the 1986 album Rat In The Kitchen.

In October 2004 Robert Mugabe of Zimbabwe banned toyi-toyi even indoors because of its use as a protest.
