= The Best of UB40 – Volume Two =

Compilation album by UB40
- Released: 30 October 1995
- Recorded: 1988–1995
- Genres: Reggae; rock
- Length: 41:29 (US); 58:36 (UK)
- Label: Virgin
- Producers: UB40; John Shaw; Gerry Parchment

UB40 chronology
Labour of Love, Volumes I and II (1994)	The Best of UB40 – Volume Two (1995)	Guns in the Ghetto (1997)

The Best of UB40 – Volume Two is a compilation album by English reggae group UB40, released in 1995. In 2005, the album was re-released as a double pack without the song "The Way You Do the Things You Do". The Best of UB40 – Volume Two peaked at number 91 on German charts.

== Reception ==
Professional ratings
Review scores
Source	Rating
AllMusic	3/5 stars

Stephen Thomas Erlewine from AllMusic felt that with the focus of the collection on the group's "pop-reggae crossovers" from the 1990s "fans of UB40's political edge and their genuine reggae roots won't find much of interest here." However, he does believe it represents "a good summation of the band's second decade".

== Track listing ==
=== US version ===
No.	Title	Writer(s)	Album	Length
1.	"Where Did I Go Wrong?"	UB40	UB40, 1988	3:47
2.	"Here I Am (Come and Take Me)"	Al Green, Teenie Hodges	Labour of Love II, 1989	4:02
3.	"Kingston Town"	Kentrick Patrick	Labour of Love II, 1989	3:48
4.	"The Way You Do the Things You Do"	Smokey Robinson, Robert Rogers	Labour of Love II, 1989	3:43
5.	"(I Can't Help) Falling in Love with You"	George Weiss, Hugo Peretti, Luigi Creatore	Promises and Lies, 1993	3:28
6.	"Higher Ground"	UB40	Promises and Lies, 1993	4:21
7.	"Bring Me Your Cup"	UB40	Promises and Lies, 1993	5:42
8.	"Reggae Music"	Byron Lee	Promises and Lies, 1993	3:41
9.	"Superstition"	Stevie Wonder	Vampire in Brooklyn (Original Motion Picture Soundtrack), 1995	5:20
10.	"Until My Dying Day"	UB40	The Best of UB40 – Volume Two, 1995	3:53
Total length:				41:29

=== UK version ===
No.	Title	Writer(s)	Album	Length
1.	"Breakfast in Bed" (featuring Chrissie Hynde)	Eddie Hinton, Donnie Fritts	UB40, 1988	3:16
2.	"Where Did I Go Wrong?"	UB40	UB40, 1988	3:46
3.	"I Would Do for You"	UB40	UB40, 1988	5:34
4.	"Homely Girl"	Eugene Record, Stan McKenny	Labour of Love II, 1989	3:23
5.	"Here I Am (Come and Take Me)"	Al Green, Teenie Hodges	Labour of Love II, 1989	4:02
6.	"Kingston Town"	Kentrick Patrick	Labour of Love II, 1989	3:46
7.	"Wear You to the Ball"	John Holt	Labour of Love II, 1989	3:33
8.	"(I Can’t Help) Falling in Love with You"	George Weiss, Hugo Peretti, Luigi Creatore	Promises and Lies, 1993	3:27
9.	"Higher Ground"	UB40	Promises and Lies, 1993	4:20
10.	"Bring Me Your Cup"	UB40	Promises and Lies, 1993	5:41
11.	"C'est La Vie"	UB40	Promises and Lies, 1993	4:30
12.	"Reggae Music"	Byron Lee	Promises and Lies, 1993	4:05
13.	"Superstition"	Stevie Wonder	Vampire in Brooklyn (Original Motion Picture Soundtrack), 1995	5:20
14.	"Until My Dying Day"	UB40	The Best of UB40 – Volume Two, 1995	3:54
Total length:				58:36

== Charts ==
=== Weekly charts ===
Chart (1995)	Peak position
Dutch Albums (Album Top 100)	24
German Albums (Offizielle Top 100)	91
New Zealand Albums (RMNZ)	9
UK Albums (Official Charts)	12

=== Year-end charts ===
Chart (1995)	Position
UK Albums (OCC)	62

== Certifications and sales ==
Region	Certification	Certified units/sales
New Zealand (RMNZ)	Platinum	15,000^{^}
^{^} Shipments figures based on certification alone.
