= Who You Fighting For? =

Studio album by UB40
- Released: 13 June 2005
- Genre: Reggae
- Label: DEP International
- Producer: UB40

UB40 chronology
Homegrown (2003)	Who You Fighting For? (2005)	TwentyFourSeven (2008)

Professional ratings
Review scores
Source	Rating
Allmusic	4/5 stars
BBC Music	(positive)
Entertainment.ie	3/5 stars
musicOMH	(mixed)
Rolling Stone	3.5/5 stars
The Times	2/5 stars

Who You Fighting For? is the fifteenth album by UB40 released on 13 June 2005. The album was nominated for the reggae album Grammy in 2006. It marks the return of the rootsier, political sound that the group cultivated during the early 1980s. It was the band's first release by Rhino Records in the US.

== Track listing ==
All tracks composed by UB40; except where indicated

1. "Who You Fighting For?" – 3:30
2. "After Tonight" (Dennis Bovell, Errol Pottinger) – 3:42
3. "Bling Bling" – 3:21
4. "Plenty More" – 3:55
5. "War Poem" – 3:48
6. "Sins of the Fathers" – 4:28
7. "Good Situation" (Herman Davis, Russell Lewis) – 4:02
8. "Gotta Tell Someone" – 4:22
9. "Reasons" (Hunterz) – 3:53
10. "One Woman Man" – 3:21
11. "I'll Be on My Way" – 2:12 (Lennon–McCartney)
12. "Kiss and Say Goodbye" (Winfred Lovett) – 3:12
13. "Things You Say You Love" (Norris Weir, Tommy Cowan) – 3:24

== Reasons ==
"Reasons" is the 9th track in the album. The song reached number 75 on the UK singles chart. Hunterz and The Dhol Blasters also feature in the song. The song is distinguished by its chorus with Punjabi words, which is woven into a song with a reggae rhythm. The Punjabi lyrics are:

Tere bin meno chain na aveh, Oh soniye

These can be roughly translated as

without you I have no peace, O beautiful one

The song basically describes 9 reasons why the singer loves his beauty.

== Personnel ==
- Jim Brown – drums
- Ali Campbell – guitar, lead vocals
- Robin Campbell – lead guitar, vocals
- Earl Falconer – bass guitar, vocals
- Norman Lamont Hassan – percussion, trombone, vocals
- Brian Travers – saxophone
- Mickey Virtue – keyboards
- Astro – toasting vocals, percussion, trumpet, backing vocals

== Certifications ==
Certifications for Who You Fighting For?
Region	Certification	Certified units/sales
New Zealand (RMNZ)	Gold	7,500^{^}
United Kingdom (BPI)	Silver	60,000^{‡}
^{^} Shipments figures based on certification alone.^{‡} Sales+streaming figures based on certification alone.
