= UB44 =

Studio album by UB40
- Released: 27 September 1982
- Studios: Windmill Lane Studios, Dublin
- Genre: Reggae
- Length: 40:13
- Label: DEP International
- Producer: UB40

UB40 chronology
Present Arms (1981)	UB44 (1982)	Labour of Love (1983)

Professional ratings
Review scores
Source	Rating
AllMusic	3/5 stars
Sounds	3.5/5 stars

UB44 is the third studio album of original material by UB40, released on the DEP International label in 1982. It was advertised as their 'fourth album' (hence the title) although Present Arms in Dub had been a remix album. The album reached No. 4 in the UK album chart and the early release of the packaging had a hologram cover. UB44 was the Department of Employment form letter sent to British unemployment benefit claimants when they missed their 'signing on' appointment.

== Releases ==
The album was initially released on LP and cassette. A CD reissue followed in 1993. Some releases incorrectly state that the album was recorded in 1981.

== Content ==
This album was effectively the last one in their early musical style, again mixing heavy, doom-laden reggae soundscapes with politically and socially conscious lyrics. In particular, "I Won't Close My Eyes" and "Love is All is Alright" use reverb, echoes, and stereo positioning for a shimmering, three dimensional feel indicated by the 3D cover. Droning rhythms induce a trance, evoking reggae's substance behind the muse. "Love is All is Alright" is a slow number with close sounding, harmonised vocals. Sax and trumpet echo in a huge hall, sounding like some Caribbean band of long ago. A funky, effected, simple guitar twang adds to the old and new feel. The lyrics challenge the listener that "a little more hate" may be needed in polarised racial and class conflicts.

== Track listing ==
All tracks composed by UB40

1. "So Here I Am" – 3:54
2. "I Won't Close My Eyes" (remix) – 3:46
3. "Forget the Cost" – 4:22
4. "Love Is All Is Alright" (remix) – 4:57
5. "The Piper Calls the Tune" – 3:50
6. "The Key" – 5:05
7. "Don't Do the Crime" – 4:12
8. "Folitician" (remix) – 4:10
9. "The Prisoner" – 5:57

== Personnel ==
UB40

- Ali Campbell – vocals, guitar
- Astro – trumpet, vocals, toasting
- Brian Travers – saxophone
- Robin Campbell – guitar, vocals
- Michael Virtue – keyboards
- Earl Falconer – bass guitar
- James "Jim" Brown – drums, vocals, synthesized percussion
- Norman Hassan – percussion, trombone

Technical

- Rafe McKenna – assistant producer, mixing engineer
- Paul Thomas – recording engineer
- Optec Design – artwork, hologram
