= TwentyFourSeven (UB40 album) =

Studio album by UB40
- Released: 9 June 2008
- Genre: Reggae
- Length: 1:12:13
- Label: Edel Records 0191632ERE
- Producer: UB40

UB40 chronology
Who You Fighting For? (2005)	TwentyFourSeven (2008)	Greatest Hits (2008)

Professional ratings
Review scores
Source	Rating
Allmusic	3.5/5 stars

TwentyFourSeven is the sixteenth studio album by UB40. It is the last UB40 album to feature the classic line-up with vocalist/guitarist Ali Campbell and keyboardist Mickey Virtue. In 2008 both of them departed from the band.

== Background ==
Twentyfourseven was released as a free insert in The Mail on Sunday's 4 May 2008 issue, which sold nearly three million copies. This however, led to a backlash when the full 17-track version was released 21 June 2008, and most of the big retailers refused to stock it. It reached #81 in the UK Albums Chart in the UK. This was a first for UB40, as all the official albums had previously gone Top 50 on the UK Albums Chart.

The track "Rainbow Nation" refers to Gary Tyler once again, originally the subject of "Tyler", the first song on their first album, Signing Off. The original saxophone part from "Tyler" is played over the closing bars of the track.

UB40's next release (on EMI) was a collection called Love Songs. This reached number 3 in the UK Charts.

== Track listing ==
=== The Mail on Sunday version ===
1. "Rainbow Nation"
2. "End of War"
3. "Lost and Found"
4. "Here We Go Again"
5. "Oh America"
6. "Instant Radical Change of Perception"
7. "I'll Be There"
8. "Once Around"
9. "This Is How It Is"
10. "The Road"

=== Full CD version ===
1. "End of War"
2. "Lost and Found"
3. "Dance Until The Morning Light" (with Maxi Priest ft. DJ Rapper Truth)
4. "This Is How It Is"
5. "Rainbow Nation"
6. "Here We Go Again"
7. "I Shot the Sheriff" (with Maxi Priest, Marvin Priest & DJ Beniton)
8. "Oh America" (extended version; with One Love & Rasta Don of Arrested Development)
9. "Once Around"
10. "Slow Down"
11. "I'll Be Back" (Lennon/McCartney)
12. "Instant Radical Change of Perception"
13. "It's All in the Game" (with Duncan Campbell)
14. "I'll Be There"
15. "Middle of the Night"
16. "Securing The Peace"
17. "The Road"
