= Amandla (power) =

Xhosa anti-apartheid political slogan

Amandla in the Nguni languages, including Xhosa and Zulu, means 'power'. The word was a popular rallying cry in the days of resistance against apartheid, used by the African National Congress and its allies. The leader of a group would call out "Amandla!" and the crowd would respond with "Awethu" or "Ngawethu!" (to us), completing the South African version of the rallying cry "power to the people!". The word is still associated with struggles against oppression.

Mandla, which is derived from amandla, is also a common first name in South Africa. The Alternative Information and Development Centre (AIDC) publishes a magazine by the same name.

== Current use in South Africa ==
Amandla is a IsiXhosa and IsiZulu word used when people make a bet, deal or promise; they say the word and hold up their hands with their thumbs up.

Since apartheid ended, people have begun to use the rallying cry "Amandla" to express their grievances against current government policies including those of the ANC. Trade unions still use it at mass meetings and protests.

The use of the term has also become popular again during service delivery protests and among poor people's movements. South Africa's independent social movements such as Abahlali baseMjondolo, the Anti-Eviction Campaign and the Mandela Park Backyarders use "Amandla Ngawethu!" during their anti-government and anti-political party protests. The chant is often used by the movements as a way of beginning or ending a speech as well as quieting down a crowd when a speaker has something important to say.

Abahalali baseMjondolo have developed the anti-apartheid call and response slogan 'Amandla! Ngawethu!' (Power! It is ours!) to 'Amandla! Awethu ngenkani!' (Power! It is ours by force!)

The Anti-Eviction Campaign also uses the phrase "Power to the Poor People" as a variation on "Amandla Ngawethu" and "Power to the People" to denote the need of poor people's movements to control and speak for themselves and not have wealthy leftist NGOs speak for them.

== See also ==
- Amandla!: A Revolution in Four-Part Harmony
- Amandala, Belizean newspaper deriving its name from the word
- Amandla, the Miles Davis album released in 1989
- Amandla Festival, a 1979 world music festival held in Boston, Massachusetts
- Amandla Stenberg
- Anti-Eviction Campaign
- Abahlali baseMjondolo
- The Mandela Park Backyarders
- "Amandla Awethu" part of UB40's "Sing Our Own Song" from their album Rat in the Kitchen
