= Labour of Love II =

Studio album by UB40
- Released: 27 November 1989
- Recorded: January–September 1989
- Genre: Reggae
- Length: 52:02
- Label: Virgin/DEP
- Producer: UB40

UB40 chronology
| UB40 (1988) | Labour of Love II (1989) | Promises and Lies (1993) |

Singles from Labour of Love II
- 1. "Here I Am (Come and Take Me)" Released: 1990; 2. "Kingston Town" Released: 1990; 3. "Wear You to the Ball" Released: 1990; 4. "The Way You Do the Things You Do" Released: 1990

Professional ratings
Review scores
| Source | Rating |
|---|---|
| AllMusic | 2/5 stars |
| Chicago Tribune | 3/4 stars |
| Robert Christgau | B |
| Orlando Sentinel | 4/5 stars |
| Rolling Stone | 3/5 stars |

"Kingston Town"
Kingston Town audio sample

Labour of Love II is the ninth studio album by English reggae band UB40, released on 27th November 1989. It is the band's second album of cover versions (following 1983's Labour of Love) and contains two top-ten US Billboard Hot 100 hits – "Here I Am (Come and Take Me)" peaked at No. 7, "The Way You Do the Things You Do" peaked at No. 6 – and "Kingston Town" reached No. 4 on the UK Singles Chart.

== Track listing ==
1989 release
| No. | Title | Writer(s) | Original artist(s) | Length |
|---|---|---|---|---|
| 1. | "Here I Am (Come and Take Me)" | Al Green; Mabon Hodges | Al Green | 4:01 |
| 2. | "Tears from My Eyes" | Donna Dawson; John Noel Anderson; Sonny Roberts | Teddy Davis | 3:50 |
| 3. | "Groovin'" | Byron Lee | Byron Lee | 3:49 |
| 4. | "The Way You Do the Things You Do" | William "Smokey" Robinson; Robert Rogers | The Temptations | 3:02 |
| 5. | "Kingston Town" | Kentrick Patrick | Lord Creator | 3:48 |
| 6. | "Baby" | Barry Llewelyn; Earl Morgan; Leroy Sibbles | The Heptones | 3:22 |
| 7. | "Wedding Day" | Harold Logan; John Patton; Lloyd Price | Lloyd Price | 3:12 |
| 8. | "Wear You to the Ball" | John Holt | The Paragons | 3:31 |
| 9. | "Homely Girl" | Eugene Record; Stan McKenny | The Chi-Lites | 3:24 |
| 10. | "Impossible Love" | Keith "Honey Boy" Williams | Keith "Honey Boy" Williams | 5:10 |
| Total length: | | | | 37:14 |

1991 reissue
| No. | Title | Writer(s) | Original artist(s) | Length |
|---|---|---|---|---|
| 1. | "Here I Am (Come and Take Me)" | Al Green; Mabon Hodges | Al Green | 4:01 |
| 2. | "Tears from My Eyes" | Donna Dawson; John Noel Anderson; Sonny Roberts | Teddy Davis | 3:50 |
| 3. | "Groovin'" | Byron Lee | Byron Lee | 3:49 |
| 4. | "The Way You Do the Things You Do" | William "Smokey" Robinson; Robert Rogers | The Temptations | 3:02 |
| 5. | "Wear You to the Ball" | John Holt | The Paragons | 3:31 |
| 6. | "Singer Man" | Cebert "Jackie" Bernard; Derrick Harriott | The Kingstonians | 3:51 |
| 7. | "Kingston Town" | Kentrick Patrick | Lord Creator | 3:48 |
| 8. | "Baby" | Barry Llewelyn; Earl Morgan; Leroy Sibbles | The Heptones | 3:22 |
| 9. | "Wedding Day" | Harold Logan; John Patton; Lloyd Price | Lloyd Price | 3:12 |
| 10. | "Sweet Cherrie" | Keith "Honey Boy" Williams | Keith "Honey Boy" Williams | 3:16 |
| 11. | "Stick By Me" | John Holt | Shep and the Limelites | 3:45 |
| 12. | "Just Another Girl" | Ken Boothe; Harris Seaton | Ken Boothe | 3:33 |
| 13. | "Homely Girl" | Eugene Record; Stan McKenny | The Chi-Lites | 3:24 |
| 14. | "Impossible Love" | Keith "Honey Boy" Williams | Keith "Honey Boy" Williams | 5:10 |
| Total length: | | | | 51:34 |

== Personnel ==
UB40

- Ali Campbell – lead vocals and backing vocals, rhythm guitar
- Robin Campbell – lead and rhythm guitar, backing vocals
- Astro – trumpet, toast and backing vocals
- Earl Falconer – bass and synthesizer, lead vocals on "Baby"
- Michael Virtue – synthesizers and sampler
- Brian Travers – saxophones
- Norman Hassan – trombone, lead vocals on "Singer Man"
- Jim Brown – electronic drums and drum machine

with:

- Patrick Tenyue – trumpet
- Henry Tenyue – trombone

Technical

- Gary Parchment, John Shaw – engineer, programming, mixing
- Barry Kamen – cover painting

== Charts ==
Chart performance for Labour of Love II
| Chart (1989–1990) | Peak position |
|---|---|
| Australian Albums (ARIA) | 20 |
| Austrian Albums (Ö3 Austria) | 6 |
| Dutch Albums (Album Top 100) | 1 |
| German Albums (Offizielle Top 100) | 9 |
| New Zealand Albums (RMNZ) | 1 |
| Swedish Albums (Sverigetopplistan) | 13 |
| UK Albums (Official Charts) | 3 |
| US Billboard 200 | 30 |

== Certifications ==
Certifications for Labour of Love II
| Region | Certification | Certified units/sales |
|---|---|---|
| Australia (ARIA) | Platinum | 70,000^{^} |
| Canada (Music Canada) | Gold | 50,000^{^} |
| France (SNEP) | 2× Platinum | 600,000^{*} |
| Netherlands (NVPI) | Platinum | 100,000^{^} |
| New Zealand (RMNZ) | 2× Platinum | 30,000^{‡} |
| Sweden (GLF) | Gold | 50,000^{^} |
| Switzerland (IFPI Switzerland) | Platinum | 50,000^{^} |
| United Kingdom (BPI) | 3× Platinum | 900,000^{^} |
| United States (RIAA) | Platinum | 1,000,000^{^} |
^{*} Sales figures based on certification alone.^{^} Shipments figures based on certification alone.^{‡} Sales+streaming figures based on certification alone.
