= Love Songs (UB40 album) =

Compilation album by UB40

Compilation album by UB40
- Released: 2009
- Recorded: 1980 – 2009
- Genre: Reggae
- Label: Virgin Records

UB40 chronology
Greatest Hits (2008)	Love Songs (2009)	Best of Labour of Love (2009)

Love Songs is a compilation album by British reggae band UB40. It was released in 2009 and includes all the love songs from by the band. The album includes 17 solo tracks as well as the 2 tracks that the band performed with Chrissie Hynde from the Pretenders and the Robert Palmer track "I'll Be Your Baby Tonight."

The album was released in time for Valentine's Day. Upon entering the UK albums chart at #3, it had become the band's highest charting album since 1993.

== Track listing ==
1. "(I Can't Help) Falling In Love With You"
2. "I Got You Babe" (Featuring Chrissie Hynde)
3. "Kiss and Say Goodbye"
4. "You're Always Pulling Me Down"
5. "Don't Break My Heart"
6. "Please Don't Make Me Cry"
7. "I Love It When You Smile"
8. "Homely Girl"
9. "Where Did I Go Wrong"
10. "Come Back Darling"
11. "Impossible Love"
12. "Dream a Lie"
13. "Tears from My Eyes"
14. "Breakfast in Bed" (UB40 And Chrissie Hynde)
15. "I'll Be Your Baby Tonight" (Robert Palmer Featuring UB40)
16. "Bring Me Your Cup"
17. "I'll Be There"
18. "Gotta Tell Someone"
19. "Here I Am (Come And Take Me)"
20. "I Would Do for You"

== Charts ==
=== Weekly charts ===
Chart (2009)	Peak position
Irish Albums (IRMA)	14
New Zealand Albums (RMNZ)	8
UK Albums (OCC)	3

=== Year-end charts ===
Chart (2009)	Position
UK Albums (OCC)	183

== Certifications ==
Region	Certification	Certified units/sales
New Zealand (RMNZ)	Platinum	15,000^{‡}
United Kingdom (BPI)	Gold	100,000^{*}
^{*} Sales figures based on certification alone.^{‡} Sales+streaming figures based on certification alone.
