= Don't Let It Pass You By / Don't Slow Down =

Single by UB40

from the album Present Arms
- Released: 1981
- Genre: Reggae
- Length: 4:33
- Label: DEP International
- Songwriter: UB40
- Producer: UB40

UB40 singles chronology
"The Earth Dies Screaming" / "Dream a Lie" (1980)	"Don't Let It Pass You By / Don't Slow Down" (1981)	"One in Ten" (1981)

"Don't Let It Pass You By / Don't Slow Down" is a double A-side single by British group UB40. It was released in 1981 as the first single from the band's second album Present Arms. The single reached No. 16 on the UK Singles Chart in May 1981, staying for nine weeks. and also peaked at No.1 on the UK Indie Chart.

== Charts ==
Chart (1981)	Peak position
Ireland (IRMA)	18
UK Singles (OCC)	16
