= One in Ten =

1981 single by UB40

Single by UB40

from the album Present Arms
- A-side: "Present Arms in Dub"
- Released: 31 July 1981
- Genre: Reggae
- Length: 4:31
- Label: DEP International
- Songwriter: UB40
- Producers: Ray "Pablo" Falconer; UB40

UB40 singles chronology
"Don't Let It Pass You By" / "Don't Slow Down" (1980)	"One in Ten" / "Present Arms in Dub" (1981)	"I Won't Close My Eyes" (1982)

"One in Ten" is a song by British reggae band UB40, released in July 1981 by DEP International as a single from their second album, Present Arms (1981). It became the band's fourth top-ten hit, peaking at number seven on the UK Singles Chart.

== Background and release ==
The song title refers to the approximately 10% of the local workforce claiming unemployment benefit in the band's home region of West Midlands in the summer of 1981 when the song was recorded and released. It is a protest against the then-Prime Minister Margaret Thatcher at a time when there was rising unemployment and inequality in the UK. The song also highlights the inequalities in the UK and around the world, referencing poverty, hunger, suicide, drug addiction and homelessness.

"One in Ten" was released in the UK as a double A-side single with "Present Arms in Dub", a dub version of the Present Arms title track which was included on the dub remix album Present Arms in Dub. Elsewhere, in Europe, "One in Ten" was released as the sole A-side with a different B-side, "Sardonicus", taken from Present Arms. In Australia, "Wildcat", also from the album, was released as the B-side.

== Charts ==
Chart (1981)	Peak position
Australia (Kent Music Report)	87
Ireland (IRMA)	18
New Zealand (Recorded Music NZ)	20
UK Singles (OCC)	7
UK Independent Singles (MRIB)	1

== Certifications ==
Region	Certification	Certified units/sales
New Zealand (RMNZ)	Gold	15,000^{‡}
^{‡} Sales+streaming figures based on certification alone.

== 808 State version ==
"One in Ten"

Single by 808 State and UB40

from the album Gorgeous
- B-side: "One in Ten (UB40 Vocal)"
- Released: 30 November 1992
- Genre: Breakbeat; house
- Length: 2:40
- Label: ZTT
- Songwriters: UB40; 808 State
- Producer: 808 State

808 State singles chronology
"Time Bomb" (1992)	"One in Ten" (1992)	"Plan 9" (1993)

UB40 singles chronology
"Baby" (1991)	"One in Ten" (1992)	"(I Can't Help) Falling in Love with You" (1993)

In November 1992, British electronic group 808 State released a remix of "One in Ten" as a single from their fourth album, Gorgeous (1993). It became the group's sixth and penultimate top-twenty hit in the UK, peaking at number 17.

=== Background and release ===
808 State's remix has been described as one of the first popular mash-ups, in this case taking the original UB40 recording and superimposing elements, mainly the vocals and saxophone, onto a track recorded by 808 State. Mash-ups had been growing in popularity since the beginning of the 1990s with Beats International's "Dub Be Good to Me" in 1990 and "You Got the Love" in 1991 by the Source featuring Candi Staton, both of which had huge chart success. The remix of "One in Ten" came about after record label ZTT Records wanted the group to record a song with vocals on so it would gain more airplay.

The single was originally set for release in the UK and Europe in October 1992 with the ZTT Records catalogue number ZANG 35; however, it was withdrawn before release due to incorrect copyright crediting. It received its release with the catalogue number ZANG 39 at the end of November. "One in Ten" also saw a release in the US on Tommy Boy Records.

== Track listings ==
- 7": ZTT / ZANG 39
1. "One in Ten" (808 7") – 2:40
2. "One in Ten" (UB40 Vocal) – 4:00
- 12": ZTT / ZANG 39T
1. "One in Ten" (808 Original Mix) – 4:16
2. "One in Ten" (Fast Fon Mix) – 3:58
3. "One in Ten" (808 7") – 2:40
- 12": ZTT / ZANG 39TX
1. "One in Ten" (UB40 Vocal) – 4:00
2. "One in Ten" (UB40 Instrumental) – 5:00
- 12": Tommy Boy / TB 553 (US)
1. "One in Ten" (808 Original Mix) – 4:16
2. "One in Ten" (Fast Fon Mix) – 3:58
3. "One in Ten" (UB40 Vocal) – 4:00
4. "One in Ten" (UB40 Instrumental) – 5:00
- CD: ZTT / ZANG 39CD & Tommy Boy / TBCD 553 (US)
1. "One in Ten" (808 7") – 2:40
2. "One in Ten" (808 Original Mix) – 4:16
3. "One in Ten" (Fast Fon Mix) – 3:58
4. "One in Ten" (UB40 Vocal) – 4:00
5. "One in Ten" (UB40 Instrumental) – 5:00

=== Charts ===
Chart (1992–93)	Peak position
Australia (ARIA)	135
Ireland (IRMA)	19
Netherlands (Dutch Top 40)	25
Netherlands (Single Top 100)	22
UK Singles (OCC)	17
UK Airplay (Music Week)	21
UK Dance (Music Week)	4
UK Club Chart (Music Week)	33
