= Higher Ground (UB40 song) =

1993 single by UB40

Single by UB40

from the album Promises and Lies
- B-side: "Chronic"
- Released: 9 August 1993
- Genre: Reggae
- Length: 4:22
- Label: DEP International; Virgin
- Songwriter: UB40
- Producer: UB40

UB40 singles chronology
"(I Can't Help) Falling in Love With You" (1993)	"Higher Ground" (1993)	"Bring Me Your Cup" (1993)

Music video
- "Higher Ground" on YouTube

"Higher Ground" is a song written and performed by English reggae band UB40. It was released in August 1993 by Virgin Records as the second single from their 10th album, Promises and Lies. The song, which was also produced by the band, reached the top 10 in Iceland, Ireland, the Netherlands, New Zealand, and the United Kingdom. In the US, it reached number 45 on the Billboard Hot 100 chart.

== Critical reception ==
Alan Jones from Music Week gave the song a score of four out of five, writing, "Given the daunting task of following the number one success of "I Can't Help Falling in Love with You", "Higher Ground" is a brave try. A bright but old-fashioned reggae song — no ragga influences here — it bounds along and quickly engrains itself on the subconscious. Not a number one but sure to reach the Top 10."

== Track listings ==
- CD maxi and 12-inch single
1. "Higher Ground" – 4:22
2. "Chronic" – 3:54
3. "Higher Ground" (Punjabi Dub – Gerry Parchment mix) – 5:07
- CD and 7-inch single
1. "Higher Ground" – 4:22
2. "Chronic" – 3:54

== Personnel ==
- All tracks produced by UB40
- Co-produced and engineered by Gerry Parchment and Delroy McLaan
- Front image cover : "Skin". Raw Orange into Black (1991–1993) by Peter Max Kandhola
- Calligraphy : Ruth Rowland
- Design : Bill Smith Studio
- Management : David Harper Management Ltd.

== Charts ==
=== Weekly charts ===
Chart (1993)	Peak position
Australia (ARIA)	40
Austria (Ö3 Austria Top 40)	16
Belgium (Ultratop 50 Flanders)	14
Canada Top Singles (RPM)	65
Europe (Eurochart Hot 100)	25
Europe (European Hit Radio)	6
France (SNEP)	23
Germany (GfK)	21
Iceland (Íslenski Listinn Topp 40)	2
Ireland (IRMA)	9
Netherlands (Dutch Top 40)	8
Netherlands (Single Top 100)	9
New Zealand (Recorded Music NZ)	8
Sweden (Sverigetopplistan)	27
Switzerland (Schweizer Hitparade)	19
UK Singles (Official Charts)	8
UK Airplay (Music Week)	3
US Billboard Hot 100	45
US Alternative Airplay (Billboard)	14
US Pop Airplay (Billboard)	16
US Cash Box Top 100	40

=== Year-end charts ===
Chart (1993)	Position
Europe (European Hit Radio)	30
Germany (Media Control)	96
Iceland (Íslenski Listinn Topp 40)	14
Netherlands (Dutch Top 40)	55
Netherlands (Single Top 100)	89
UK Singles (OCC)	68
UK Airplay (Music Week)	26

== Certifications ==
Region	Certification	Certified units/sales
New Zealand (RMNZ)	Gold	15,000^{‡}
^{‡} Sales+streaming figures based on certification alone.

== Release history ==
Region	Date	Format(s)	Label(s)	Ref.
United Kingdom	9 August 1993	7-inch vinyl; CD; cassette	DEP International; Virgin	
Australia	6 September 1993	CD; cassette	DEP International; Virgin	
