= Honey Boy (singer) =

Jamaican reggae singer

- Born: Keith Williams c. 1955
- Origin: Saint Elizabeth Parish, Jamaica
- Genres: Reggae, lovers rock
- Instrument: Vocals
- Years active: 1970s–present
- Labels: Cactus, Third World, Trojan, Diamond

Keith Williams (born c. 1955), better known as Honey Boy, is a Jamaican reggae singer best known for his recordings in the 1970s who is regarded as one of the pioneers of lovers rock.

== Biography ==
Williams was born in Saint Elizabeth Parish c. 1955. He moved to the United Kingdom in the late 1960s, living in Oxford before settling in London. He found work as a backing vocalist with Laurel Aitken before recording his debut single "Jamaica" for Trojan in 1971 and for Junior Lincoln's Banana label, beginning with the "Homeward Bound" single. Several singles followed, credited to Honey Boy and other pseudonyms such as Happy Junior and Boy Wonder. He contributed "Jamaica" to the 1971 live album Trojan Reggae Party, and his first album, This Is Honey Boy, was released in 1973.

In the mid-1970s he worked with former Studio One musician Winston Curtis, who had relocated to the UK and moved into production. He also recorded for Count Shelley. With the advent of lovers rock in the mid-1970s, Honey Boy became a major figure in the scene, having several hits on the reggae charts in 1977. In 1980 he recorded the Arise album with members of Aswad. In 2002, Honey Boy was featured vocalist on "Always There" on UB40's album UB40 Present the Fathers of Reggae.

== Album discography ==
- This Is Honey Boy (1973), Count Shelley
- Sweet Cherries Impossible Love (1974), Cactus
- Taste of Honey (1975), Cactus
- Strange Thoughts (1976), Trojan
- Lovers (1976), Third World
- Dark End of the Street (1978), Diamond
- Arise (1980), Diamond
- Love You Tonight (1995)
- Master Piece (2000) Cactus
- The Gospel and I, Pt.2 (2007), Jet Star
