= Sing Our Own Song =

1986 single by UB40

Single by UB40

from the album Rat in the Kitchen
- B-side: "Sing Our Own Song" (version)
- Released: 30 June 1986
- Genre: Reggae fusion
- Length: 4:00
- Label: DEP International
- Songwriter: UB40
- Producer: UB40

UB40 singles chronology
"Don't Break My Heart" (1985)	"Sing Our Own Song" (1986)	"All I Want to Do" (1986)

"Sing Our Own Song" is a song written and performed by British reggae group UB40. It features backing singers Jaki Graham, Mo Birch and Ruby Turner and appeared as the ninth and final track on their seventh album, Rat in the Kitchen (1986). Released in 1986, it reached number five on the UK Singles Chart and became a number-one hit in the Netherlands.

The song was written as an anti-apartheid song and was censored in South Africa. Featuring the ANC rallying cry of "Amandla Awethu", it is considered a protest song of the time.

== Charts ==
=== Weekly charts ===
Weekly chart performance for "Sing Our Own Song"
Chart (1986)	Peak position
Australia (Kent Music Report)	76
Belgium (Ultratop 50 Flanders)	7
Canada Top Singles (RPM)	70
Europe (European Hot 100 Singles)	17
Ireland (IRMA)	4
Netherlands (Dutch Top 40)	1
Netherlands (Single Top 100)	1
New Zealand (Recorded Music NZ)	7
UK Singles (Official Charts)	5
US Dance Club Songs (Billboard)	22

=== Year-end charts ===
Year-end chart performance for "Sing Our Own Song"
Chart (1986)	Position
Belgium (Ultratop 50 Flanders)	42
Netherlands (Dutch Top 40)	4
Netherlands (Single Top 100)	7
UK Singles (OCC)	98
