= Labour of Love III =

Studio album by UB40
- Released: 12 October 1998
- Recorded: 1998
- Genre: Reggae
- Length: 62:56
- Label: DEP
- Producers: UB40; Dan Armstrong; Danny Canaan

UB40 chronology
Guns in the Ghetto (1997)	Labour of Love III (1998)	Cover Up (2001)

Professional ratings
Review scores
Source	Rating
AllMusic	2/5 stars
Chicago Tribune	mixed
Rolling Stone	2/5 stars

Labour of Love III is the twelfth album and third covers album by UB40, released on DEP International label in 1998.

== Track listing ==
1. "Holly Holy" (original by Neil Diamond)
2. "It's My Delight" (original by The Melodians)
3. "Come Back Darling" (original by Johnny Osbourne)
4. "Never Let You Go" (original by Slim Smith)
5. "Soul Rebel" (original by Bob Marley)
6. "My Best Girl" (original by The Paragons)
7. "Good Ambition" (original by The Ethiopians)
8. "The Train Is Coming" (original by Ken Boothe)
9. "Blood and Fire" (original by Niney the Observer)
10. "Mr. Fix It" (original by Winston Francis)
11. "Stay a Little Bit Longer" (original by Delano Stewart)
12. "Someone Like You" (original by The Mighty Diamonds)
13. "The Time Has Come" (original by Slim Smith)
14. "Crying Over You" (original by Ken Boothe)
15. "Legalize It" (original by Peter Tosh)
  - "Brahm's Lullaby" (hidden track which follows silence after "Legalize It")

== Charts ==
Chart performance for Labour of Love III
Chart (1998)	Peak position
Dutch Albums (Album Top 100)	17
New Zealand Albums (RMNZ)	5
UK Albums (Official Charts)	8

== Certifications ==
Region	Certification	Certified units/sales
New Zealand (RMNZ)	Platinum	15,000^{^}
United Kingdom (BPI)	Gold	100,000^{^}
^{^} Shipments figures based on certification alone.
