= Breakfast in Bed =

1969 single by Dusty Springfield

Single by Dusty Springfield

from the album Dusty in Memphis
- A-side: "Don't Forget About Me"
- B-side: "Breakfast in Bed"
- Released: 1969
- Genre: Soul
- Length: 2:57
- Label: Atlantic, Philips
- Songwriters: Eddie Hinton, Donnie Fritts

Dusty Springfield singles chronology
"Don't Forget About Me" (1969)	"Breakfast in Bed" (1969)	"The Windmills of Your Mind" (1969)

"Breakfast in Bed" is a soul–R&B song written by Muscle Shoals songwriters Eddie Hinton and Donnie Fritts for Dusty Springfield. It takes a knowing spin on the line "You Don't Have to Say You Love Me", the title of a song that had previously been a number one hit for her in the UK. After being released on her 1969 album Dusty in Memphis, it was recorded and popularized the same year by Baby Washington. Harry J produced three reggae versions in 1972, by Lorna Bennett, Scotty, and Bongo Herman.

== UB40 and Chrissie Hynde version ==
"Breakfast in Bed"
- UK 12-inch single artwork

Single by UB40 and Chrissie Hynde

from the album UB40
- Released: 6 June 1988
- Genre: Reggae
- Length: 3:17 (album version); 4:08 (7-inch edit)
- Label: DEP International
- Songwriters: Eddie Hinton, Donnie Fritts
- Producer: UB40

UB40 singles chronology
"Maybe Tomorrow" (1987)	"Breakfast in Bed" (1988)	"Where Did I Go Wrong" (1988)

Chrissie Hynde singles chronology
"I Got You Babe" (1985)	"Breakfast in Bed" (1988)	"Spiritual High (State of Independence)" (1992)

Music video
- "Breakfast in Bed" on YouTube

English reggae and pop band UB40 collaborated with Chrissie Hynde of the English-American band the Pretenders for a cover version of "Breakfast in Bed", included on the band's self-titled eighth album (1988). This was the group's second time recording with Hynde for a single release, after "I Got You Babe", in 1985. UB40 chose to record the song after hearing Lorna Bennett's rendition. Released as a single in 1988, this version peaked at number six on the UK Singles Chart and entered the top ten in Belgium, Ireland, the Netherlands, and New Zealand. In the United States, the song reached number four on the Billboard Modern Rock Tracks chart.

=== Track listings ===
Non-US 7-inch single

A. "Breakfast in Bed"
B. "Breakfast in Bed" (instrumental)

Non-US 12-inch single and UK CD single

1. "Breakfast in Bed" (extended mix) – 5:34
2. "Breakfast in Bed" (12-inch dub mix parts I and II) – 7:42

US 7-inch and cassette single

A. "Breakfast in Bed" (7-inch edit) – 4:08
B. "Breakfast in Bed" (LP version) – 3:17

US 12-inch single

A1. "Breakfast in Bed" (extended version) – 5:34
B1. "Breakfast in Bed" (dub part 1) – 3:28
B2. "Breakfast in Bed" (dub part 2) – 4:17

Japanese mini-CD single

1. "Breakfast in Bed"
2. "Breakfast in Bed" (extended mix)

=== Charts ===
==== Weekly charts ====
Chart (1988)	Peak position
Australia (ARIA)	43
Belgium (Ultratop 50 Flanders)	10
Canada Top Singles (RPM)	91
Europe (Eurochart Hot 100)	19
Ireland (IRMA)	9
Netherlands (Dutch Top 40)	4
Netherlands (Single Top 100)	10
New Zealand (Recorded Music NZ)	5
Switzerland (Schweizer Hitparade)	16
UK Singles (Official Charts)	6
US Alternative Airplay (Billboard)	4
West Germany (GfK)	40

==== Year-end charts ====
Chart (1988)	Position
Belgium (Ultratop)	85
Netherlands (Dutch Top 40)	31
Netherlands (Single Top 100)	68
New Zealand (RIANZ)	43
UK Singles (OCC)	85

=== Certifications ===
Region	Certification	Certified units/sales
New Zealand (RMNZ)	Gold	15,000^{‡}
^{‡} Sales+streaming figures based on certification alone.

== Other cover versions ==
- 1979 Sheila Hylton; reached number 57 in the UK Singles Chart in 1979
- 2004 Nicole Scherzinger of the Pussycat Dolls on the soundtrack of the film 50 First Dates
