= Rat in Mi Kitchen =

1987 single by UB40

Single by UB40

from the album Rat in the Kitchen
- B-side: "Rat in Mi Kitchen" (version)
- Released: 5 January 1987
- Length: 6:58
- Label: DEP International
- Songwriter: UB40
- Producer: UB40

UB40 singles chronology
"All I Want to Do" (1986)	"Rat in Mi Kitchen" (1987)	"Watchdogs" (1987)

Official audio
- "Rat in Mi Kitchen" on YouTube

"Rat in Mi Kitchen" is a song written and performed by British reggae and pop group UB40. It features Herb Alpert on trumpet and is the sixth track on their seventh album, Rat in the Kitchen (1986). Released as a single on 5 January 1987, it reached number 12 on the UK Singles Chart later the same month, staying on the chart for seven weeks. The sleeve artwork is by Bob Linney.

== Background ==
Although "Rat in Mi Kitchen" is attributed to the whole group, like many UB40 songs, it was written by Astro. At the time, lead singer Ali Campbell had moved into a new home in Balsall Heath, Birmingham and was troubled by rodents. When asked by Astro if he had any ideas for new songs he replied, "Oh God, I don't care about the album for a minute, I've got a rat in the kitchen!" Astro, who sings lead vocals on the song, wrote the track in response.

== Charts ==
=== Weekly charts ===
Chart (1987)	Peak position
Australia (Kent Music Report)	84
Belgium (Ultratop 50 Flanders)	4
Europe (European Hot 100 Singles)	23
Ireland (IRMA)	7
Netherlands (Dutch Top 40)	7
Netherlands (Single Top 100)	7
New Zealand (Recorded Music NZ)	45
UK Singles (Official Charts)	12

=== Year-end charts ===
Chart (1987)	Position
Belgium (Ultratop)	64
Netherlands (Dutch Top 40)	47
Netherlands (Single Top 100)	41

== Certifications ==
Region	Certification	Certified units/sales
New Zealand (RMNZ)	Gold	15,000^{‡}
United Kingdom (BPI)	Silver	200,000^{‡}
^{‡} Sales+streaming figures based on certification alone.
