= Geffery Morgan =

Studio album by UB40
- Released: 8 October 1984
- Studio: The Abattoir, Birmingham
- Genre: Reggae
- Length: 39:00
- Label: DEP International
- Producer: UB40, Howard Gray

UB40 chronology
Labour of Love (1983)	Geffery Morgan (1984)	Baggariddim (1985)

Professional ratings
Review scores
Source	Rating
AllMusic	4.5/5 stars
Robert Christgau	A−
Rolling Stone	4/5 stars

Geffery Morgan is the fifth album by UB40. Released in 1984, it takes its title from a band roadie who had a friend named Geffery Morgan who loved white girls. Following the success of their covers album, Labour of Love, all tracks on this album are self-penned. The album contained the hit "If It Happens Again", which reached No. 9 in the UK Singles Chart.

== Track listing ==
All tracks composed and arranged by UB40

1. "Riddle Me" – 3:57
2. "As Always You Were Wrong Again" – 3:37
3. "If It Happens Again" – 3:44
4. "D.U.B." – 4:52
5. "The Pillow" – 3:26
6. "Nkomo-A-Go-Go" – 3:06
7. "Seasons" – 3:48
8. "You're Not an Army" – 3:46
9. "I'm Not Fooled So Easily" – 4:14
10. "Your Eyes Were Open" – 5:00

== Personnel ==
UB40

- Ali Campbell – lead vocals and backing vocals, rhythm guitar
- Robin Campbell – lead vocals and backing vocals, lead guitar
- Astro – trumpet and backing vocals
- Brian Travers – saxophone and lyricon
- Michael Virtue – synthesizers and electric piano
- Earl Falconer – bass
- Norman Hassan – trombone, percussions and backing vocals
- Jim Brown – electronic drums and drum machine
