= If It Happens Again =

1984 single by UB40

Single by UB40

from the album Geffery Morgan
- B-side: "Nkomo A Go-Go"
- Released: 10 September 1984
- Genre: Reggae fusion
- Length: 3:39
- Label: DEP International; A&M
- Songwriter: UB40
- Producers: UB40; Howard Gray

UB40 singles chronology
"Cherry Oh Baby" (1984)	"If It Happens Again" (1984)	"Riddle Me" (1984)

"If It Happens Again" is a song and single written and performed by British group, UB40. It was featured on their album Geffery Morgan and was released in 1984 reaching 9, on the UK charts, staying for eight weeks. It also made 9 on the Irish charts and 8 on the Dutch charts.

"If It Happens Again" was originally an instrumental called "Bouncing Around" dating back to when the band formed in 1978. The lyrics were later written as the group's response to Margaret Thatcher's Conservative Party's victory in the 1983 UK election. It contains the lines "If it happens again I'm leaving, I'll pack my things and go... I won't say I told you so" and is considered a protest song of the time.

== Track listing ==
7": DEP International / DEP 11

1. "If It Happens Again" – 3:39
2. "Nkomo A Go-Go" – 3:14

12": DEP International / DEP 10-12

1. "If It Happens Again" (Dance Mix) – 6:26
2. "Nkomo A Go-Go" (Dance Mix) – 4:56

12": A&M / SP-12112 (US)

1. "If It Happens Again" (Extended Version) – 6:25
2. "If It Happens Again" (Single Version) – 3:40
3. "Nkomo A Go-Go" – 4:56

== Charts ==
=== Weekly charts ===
Chart (1984)	Peak position
Australia (Kent Music Report)	55
Belgium (Ultratop 50 Flanders)	11
Canada Top Singles (RPM)	56
Ireland (IRMA)	9
Netherlands (Dutch Top 40)	7
Netherlands (Single Top 100)	8
New Zealand (Recorded Music NZ)	28
UK Singles (Official Charts)	9
US Dance Club Songs (Billboard) If It Happens Again / Nkomo A Go-Go	69

=== Year-end charts ===
Chart (1984)	Position
Netherlands (Dutch Top 40)	57
Netherlands (Single Top 100)	64

== Certifications ==
Region	Certification	Certified units/sales
New Zealand (RMNZ)	Gold	15,000^{‡}
^{‡} Sales+streaming figures based on certification alone.
