= Lord Creator =

Trinidadian musical artist (1935–2023)

Lord Creator OD
- Born: Kentrick Randolph Patrick; 21 August 1935; San Fernando, Trinidad and Tobago
- Died: 30 June 2023 (aged 87)
- Genres: Calypso, rocksteady, ska
- Instrument: Vocals
- Labels: Island Records, Melodisc Records

Kentrick Randolph Patrick OD (21 August 1935 – 30 June 2023), known professionally as Lord Creator, was a Trinidadian calypso, R&B, ska, and rocksteady musician and singer. Alongside Cuban-born Roland Alphonso, Barbadian Jackie Opel and fellow Trinidadians Lynn Taitt and Lord Brynner, Lord Creator was an important and positive "outside" influence during the early development of the Jamaican music scene.

== Life and career ==
Kentrick Patrick was born in San Fernando, Trinidad and Tobago on 21 August 1935.

Patrick started as a calypso singer in Trinidad under the stage name Lord Creator and recorded his first hits, "The Cockhead" and "Evening News", in Trinidad in 1958 and 1959, respectively, with Fitz Vaughan Bryan's big band. Due to the success of his hit "Evening News", which was released in Trinidad on the Cook label and also in the UK on the Melodisc label, he moved to Jamaica in late 1959 to perform and record and decided to settle there. In 1962, he recorded "Independent Jamaica" with producer Vincent "Randy" Chin, which became the official song marking Jamaica's independence from the United Kingdom's British Empire on 6 August 1962 after 307 years. That song was also the first record on Chris Blackwell's newly founded Island Records label in the United Kingdom (Island 001). In 1963, "Don't Stay Out Late", produced by Chin, became a hit in Jamaica.

In 1964, he had a further hit with "Big Bamboo", produced by Coxsone Dodd with Tommy McCook on saxophone. After "Little Princess" in 1964, he recorded a calypso album, Jamaica Time, at Studio One. It included calypso classics like "Jamaica Farewell" and "Yellowbird", as well as a cover of Bob Dylan's "Blowin' in the Wind". His next album, Big Bamboo, was recorded at Dynamic Studios sometime after 1969, when the studio was established by Byron Lee. Carlton Lee is listed as the producer.

Lord Creator had another big hit with "Kingston Town", a tune he recorded for producer Clancy Eccles in 1970. After that, Lord Creator virtually disappeared from the music industry; although in 1976, he still recorded "Big Pussy Sally", a no-holding-back, free-spirited song which was done on the same tape as Fay Bennett's equally lewd and light-hearted "Big Cocky Wally" for Lee 'Scratch' Perry in the Black Ark studio. Both songs were released on two separate Island Records singles in the UK, both on the B-side accompanied by two different Upsetters dubs. In 1977 Lord Creator returned to the Black Ark to re-record his contemplative conscious roots song, "Such is Life" (originally a Randy Chin-Vincent Chin 1968 production). Using the artist name Prodigal Creator, the song was also re-released as the 'b' side of the Jolly Brothers aka Jolly Boys' discomix 'Conscious Man' on the Ballistic Record label.

Lord Creator returned to Trinidad and Tobago after suffering two strokes.

In 1989, the British band UB40 recorded a cover version of "Kingston Town", which helped to revive Lord Creator's career. He appeared in oldies shows in Jamaica, and toured Japan.

Following the success of the UB40 cover, Patrick returned to Jamaica, living in Montego Bay. As of August 2020 Patrick resided in Hanover Parish. In 2022 he was the recipient of Jamaica's Order of Distinction (Officer).

Lord Creator died on 30 June 2023, at the age of 87.
