= Guns in the Ghetto =

Studio album by UB40
- Released: 30 June 1997
- Genre: Pop; reggae
- Length: 38:38
- Label: DEP International
- Producer: UB40

UB40 chronology
Promises and Lies (1993)	Guns in the Ghetto (1997)	Labour of Love III (1998)

Professional ratings
Review scores
Source	Rating
AllMusic	2/5 stars
Chicago Tribune	2/4 stars
The Encyclopedia of Popular Music	3/5 stars
MusicHound Rock: The Essential Album Guide	2.5/5 stars
NME	5/10
The New Rolling Stone Album Guide	2.5/5 stars

Guns in the Ghetto is the eleventh studio album by UB40. It was released in 1997 on the DEP International label.

== Critical reception ==
NME wrote that the band "play reggae with the edges filed off, made anodyne and palatable for people who aren't that interested in music any more." The New Rolling Stone Album Guide wrote that the album "has good instincts and solid playing but generally weak material."

== Track listing ==
All tracks composed by UB40

1. "Always There"
2. "Hurry Come Up"
3. "I Love It When You Smile"
4. "I've Been Missing You"
5. "Oracabessa Moonshine"
6. "Guns in the Ghetto"
7. "Tell Me Is It True"
8. "Friendly Fire"
9. "I Really Can't Say"
10. "Lisa"

== Charts ==
Chart (1997)	Peak position
Australian Albums (ARIA)	147
Austrian Albums (Ö3 Austria)	20
French Albums (SNEP)	36
German Albums (Offizielle Top 100)	75
Dutch Albums (Album Top 100)	16
New Zealand Albums (RMNZ)	16
Swiss Albums (Schweizer Hitparade)	20
US Billboard 200	176
US Top Reggae Albums	1
