= UB40 (album) =

Studio album by UB40
- Released: 11 July 1988
- Studio: The Abattoir, Birmingham
- Genre: Reggae
- Length: 41:22
- Label: DEP International
- Producer: UB40

UB40 chronology
The Best of UB40 – Volume One (1987)	UB40 (1988)	Labour of Love II (1989)

Singles from UB40
- 1. "Breakfast in Bed" Released: 1988; 2. "Where Did I Go Wrong" Released: 1988; 3. "Come Out to Play" Released: 1988; 4. "I Would Do for You" Released: 1988

Professional ratings
Review scores
Source	Rating
AllMusic	4/5 stars
Robert Christgau	B+
Los Angeles Times	2.5/4 stars

UB40 is the eighth album by British reggae band UB40, released on the DEP International label in 11 July 1988. This album contained the hit single "Breakfast in Bed" with Chrissie Hynde, which reached No. 6 in the UK charts.

== Track listing ==
All tracks composed and arranged by UB40; except where indicated

1. "Dance With the Devil" – 5:43
2. "Come Out to Play" – 3:15 *
3. "Breakfast in Bed" (Eddie Hinton, Donnie Fritts) – Dusty Springfield Cover – 3:21 *
4. "You're Always Pulling Me Down" – 4:02
5. "I Would Do For You" – 5:36 *
6. "'Cause It Isn't True" – 2:58
7. "Where Did I Go Wrong" – 3:52 *
8. "Contaminated Minds" – 4:48
9. "Matter of Time" – 3:22
10. "Music So Nice" – 3:41
11. "Dance with the Devil (Reprise)" – 2:16

UK Singles *

== Personnel ==
- Dee Johnson, Linda Sandiford – backing vocals
- Patrick Tenyue – guest trumpet
- Henry Tenyue – guest trombone
- Neil Ferris – Thai bells

Technical

- Steve Masterson – cover painting

== Charts ==
Chart performance for UB40
Chart (1988)	Peak position
Australian Albums (ARIA)	41
Dutch Albums (Album Top 100)	7
German Albums (Offizielle Top 100)	62
New Zealand Albums (RMNZ)	11
Swedish Albums (Sverigetopplistan)	32
Swiss Albums (Schweizer Hitparade)	15
UK Albums (OCC)	12
US Billboard 200	44

== Certifications ==
Certifications for UB40
Region	Certification	Certified units/sales
Netherlands (NVPI)	Gold	50,000^{^}
New Zealand (RMNZ)	Gold	7,500^{^}
United Kingdom (BPI)	Gold	100,000^{^}
^{^} Shipments figures based on certification alone.
