= Present Arms (album) =

- Standard vinyl/CD cover art

Studio album by UB40
- Released: 29 May 1981
- Studios: The Music Centre, Wembley
- Genre: Reggae
- Length: 47:09 (original version); 167:45 (deluxe edition)
- Labels: DEP International (1981); Universal Music/Virgin EMI (2014)
- Producers: Ray Falconer; Bob Lamb; UB40

UB40 chronology
Signing Off (1980)	Present Arms (1981)	UB44 (1982)

Singles from Present Arms
- 1. "Don't Let It Pass You By / Don't Slow Down" Released: May 1981; 2. "One in Ten" Released: July 1981

"One in Ten"
"One in Ten" audio sample

Professional ratings
Review scores
Source	Rating
AllMusic	3/5 stars
Christgau's Record Guide	A−
Encyclopedia of Popular Music	3/5 stars
The Great Rock Discography	7/10
MusicHound	3/5
Record Mirror	4.5/5 stars
The Rolling Stone Album Guide	3.5/5 stars
Smash Hits	7½/10
Uncut	8/10

Present Arms is the second album by UB40 and was released in 1981. It spent 38 weeks on the UK album charts, reaching number 2. An album of original songs, it spawned two top 20 hits in "One in Ten" (number 7) and "Don't Let It Pass You By/Don't Slow Down" (16).

Like their first album Signing Off, Present Arms contained many socially and politically charged lyrics, from the anti-military title track to "Sardonicus" which was linked to both President Ronald Reagan and risus sardonicus, an ironic smile on tetanus victims' faces, The UK top-ten hit "One in Ten" was an attack on Thatcherism. The album also touches on a subject very dear to UB40's heart: 'Lamb's Bread' and 'Don't Walk On The Grass' are written as part of the band's longstanding campaign for the legalisation of cannabis. Musically, the album continued in the heavy, reverb-drenched, mellifluous style of the debut.

The title track has been used to open UB40 concerts from the mid 1990s onwards, usually with the blasting horn section beginning the concert.

Like Signing Off, Present Arms was critically acclaimed and commercially successful in the UK.

A dub version of this album called Present Arms in Dub was released soon after.

In 2014, the album was rereleased as a deluxe 3-CD edition.

Track 13 of the third disc of the deluxe edition, the song "Burden of Shame" is misspelled "Burdon of Shame".

Most if not all CD iterations of the album (including the 2014 Deluxe Edition) have the titles of "Don't Walk on the Grass" and "Dr. X" transposed; "Dr. X" is the shorter of the two tracks, and begins with a count-in.

== Track listing ==
=== LP version ===
All tracks composed by UB40

==== Disc one (album) ====
Side 1

1. "Present Arms" – 4:08
2. "Sardonicus" – 4:29
3. "Don't Let It Pass You By" – 7:45
4. "Wildcat" – 3:04

Side 2

1. "One in Ten" – 4:32
2. "Don't Slow Down" – 4:28
3. "Silent Witness" – 4:15
4. "Lamb's Bread" – 4:48

==== Disc two (EP) ====
With the original 1981 release was a 12" single (7" single in some countries) containing two instrumental tracks. These were added to the CD album.

1. "Don't Walk on the Grass" – 5:20
2. "Dr X" – 5:07

=== CD version ===
1. "Present Arms" – 4:08
2. "Sardonicus" – 4:29
3. "Don't Let It Pass You By" – 7:45
4. "Wildcat" – 3:04
5. "One in Ten" – 4:32
6. "Don't Slow Down" – 4:28
7. "Silent Witness" – 4:15
8. "Lamb's Bread" – 4:48
9. "Dr. X" – 5:07
10. "Don't Walk on the Grass" – 5:20

=== 2014 deluxe edition ===
Disc 1: Present Arms

1. "Present Arms" – 4:10
2. "Sardonicus" – 4:29
3. "Don't Let It Pass You By" – 7:46
4. "Wildcat" – 3:04
5. "One in Ten" – 4:34
6. "Don't Slow Down" – 4:29
7. "Silent Witness" – 4:15
8. "Lamb's Bread" – 4:48
9. "Dr. X" – 5:07
10. "Don't Walk on the Grass" – 5:20
11. "Don't Slow Down" (extended version) – 7:14

Disc 2: Present Arms in Dub

1. "Present Arms in Dub" – 3:04
2. "Smoke It" – 3:23
3. "B-Line" – 4:36
4. "King's Row" – 4:57
5. "Return of Dr. X" – 5:23
6. "Walk Out" – 3:13
7. "One in Ten" (Present Arms in Dub version) – 4:17
8. "Neon Haze" – 4:21

Disc 3: BBC Live Sessions

BBC Radio 1 Session 23/04/81

1. "One in Ten"
2. "Present Arms"
3. "Silent Witness"
4. "Sardonicus"

BBC Radio 1 in Concert 13/06/81

5. "Present Arms" (includes intro by Gary Crowley)
6. "Tyler"
7. "Food for Thought"
8. "Don't Let It Pass You By"
9. "Sardonicus"
10. "One in Ten"
11. "Madame Medusa"
12. "Don't Slow Down"
13. "Burden of Shame"
14. "Don't Walk on the Grass"
15. "I Think It's Going to Rain Today / Dream a Lie / My Way of Thiniking" (Medley)

== Personnel ==
UB40

- Astro – trumpet, vocals, toasting
- Jimmy Brown – drums, vocals
- Ali Campbell – vocals, guitar
- Robin Campbell – vocals, guitar
- Earl Falconer – bass guitar
- Norman Hassan – electronic drums, percussion, trombone
- Brian Travers – saxophone
- Michael Virtue – keyboards

with:

- Neil Black – violin on "Dr. X"

Production

- Ray "Pablo" Falconer – producer
- Pete Wandless – engineer
- Neil Black – assistant engineer

== Certifications ==
Region	Certification	Certified units/sales
Netherlands (NVPI)	Gold	50,000^{^}
United Kingdom (BPI)	Platinum	300,000^{^}
^{^} Shipments figures based on certification alone.
