= Promises and Lies =

Studio album by UB40
- Released: 12 July 1993
- Genre: Reggae
- Length: 47:09
- Label: Virgin/DEP
- Producer: UB40

UB40 chronology
Labour of Love II (1989)	Promises and Lies (1993)	Guns in the Ghetto (1997)

Professional ratings
Review scores
Source	Rating
AllMusic	2/5 stars
Calgary Herald	C+
Robert Christgau	(dud)
Entertainment Weekly	A−
Los Angeles Times	2/4 stars
Music Week	3/5 stars
The Observer	(favorable)
Q	4/5 stars

Promises and Lies is the tenth album by the British reggae band UB40, released in 1993. It includes the hit from the soundtrack of the 1993 movie Sliver, "Can't Help Falling in Love", originally sung by Elvis Presley. The album reached No. 1 in the UK and No. 6 in the United States. It is the band's best-selling album, having sold over 9 million copies.

== Track listing ==
All tracks are written by UB40 (Brian Travers, Ali Campbell, Earl Falconer, Jimmy Brown, Norman Hassan, Robin Campbell, Mickey Virtue and Terence Wilson), unless otherwise noted.

No.	Title	Writer(s)	Length
1.	"C'est La Vie"		4:31
2.	"Desert Sand"		4:48
3.	"Promises and Lies"		3:38
4.	"Bring Me Your Cup"		5:41
5.	"Higher Ground"		4:21
6.	"Reggae Music"		4:06
7.	"(I Can't Help) Falling in Love with You" (Elvis Presley cover)	Luigi Creatore, Hugo Peretti, George David Weiss	3:27
8.	"Now and Then"		3:40
9.	"Things Ain't Like They Used to Be"		4:01
10.	"It's a Long Long Way"		4:29
11.	"Sorry"		4:27
Total length:			47:09

== Charts ==
=== Weekly charts ===
Weekly chart performance for Promises and Lies
Chart (1993–94)	Peak position
Australian Albums (ARIA)	1
Austrian Albums (Ö3 Austria)	2
Canada Top Albums/CDs (RPM)	2
Dutch Albums (Album Top 100)	1
European Albums (European Top 100 Albums)	2
German Albums (Offizielle Top 100)	2
Hungarian Albums (MAHASZ)	6
New Zealand Albums (RMNZ)	1
Norwegian Albums (VG-lista)	6
Swedish Albums (Sverigetopplistan)	4
Swiss Albums (Schweizer Hitparade)	2
UK Albums (Official Charts)	1
US Billboard 200	6

=== Year-end charts ===
1993 year-end chart performance for Promises and Lies
Chart (1993)	Position
Austrian Albums (Ö3 Austria)	15
Canada Top Albums/CDs (RPM)	20
Dutch Albums (Album Top 100)	21
European Albums (European Top 100 Albums)	12
German Albums (Offizielle Top 100)	23
New Zealand Albums (RMNZ)	7
Spanish Albums (AFYVE)	9
Swiss Albums (Schweizer Hitparade)	11
UK Albums (OCC)	7
US Billboard 200	77

1994 year-end chart performance for Promises and Lies
Chart (1994)	Position
New Zealand Albums (RMNZ)	39

== Certifications and sales ==
Certifications and sales for Promises and Lies
Region	Certification	Certified units/sales
Argentina	—	67,000
Australia (ARIA)	Gold	35,000^{^}
Austria (IFPI Austria)	Gold	25,000^{*}
Canada (Music Canada)	Platinum	100,000^{^}
Colombia	—	40,000
France (SNEP)	Platinum	300,000^{*}
Germany (BVMI)	Platinum	500,000^{^}
Indonesia	—	250,000
Ivory Coast	—	22,000
Netherlands (NVPI)	Platinum	100,000^{^}
New Zealand	—	72,000
Spain (Promusicae)	3× Platinum	300,000^{^}
Sweden (GLF)	Gold	50,000^{^}
Switzerland (IFPI Switzerland)	Platinum	50,000^{^}
South Africa	—	150,000
United Kingdom (BPI)	2× Platinum	600,000^{^}
United States (RIAA)	Platinum	1,000,000^{^}
^{*} Sales figures based on certification alone.^{^} Shipments figures based on certification alone.

== See also ==
- List of best-selling albums in Indonesia
