= Present Arms in Dub =

Remix album by UB40
- Released: October 1981
- Studios: The Music Centre, Wembley
- Genres: Reggae, dub
- Length: 33:32
- Label: DEP International
- Producers: UB40, Ray "Pablo" Falconer

UB40 chronology
Present Arms (1981)	Present Arms in Dub (1981)	The Singles Album (1982)

Present Arms in Dub is a remix album by UB40 released in October 1981. The album contains eight remixed instrumental versions of original tracks from Present Arms and its bonus 12" single; only the tracks "Don't Let It Pass You By" and "Don't Slow Down" are not remixed and included. The album was the first dub album to enter the UK top 40, where it reached number 38 and spent 7 weeks in the chart. The dub style is characterised as a mainly instrumental version of an existing song, typically emphasising the drums and bass.

== Track listing ==
1. "Present Arms in Dub" – 3:04
2. "Smoke It" – 3:23
3. "B-Line" – 4:36
4. "Kings Row" – 4:57
5. "Return of Dr X" – 5:23
6. "Walk Out" – 3:13
7. "One in Ten" – 4:15
8. "Neon Haze" – 4:21
- The song "Neon Haze" ends at 4:02. At minute 4:06, begins a hidden track: it is an industrial noise that closes the album.

== Connection to Present Arms album ==
Present Arms in Dub title	Linked to	Present Arms title
Present Arms in Dub	>>	Present Arms
Smoke It	>>	Don't Walk on the Grass ###
B-Line	>>	Lambs Bread
Kings Row	>>	Sardonicus
Return of Dr X	>>	Dr X ###
Walk Out	>>	Wild Cat
One in Ten	>>	One in Ten
Neon Haze	>>	Silent Witness

The track listing shows that most of the dub versions have different song titles to those used on Present Arms. But in keeping with typical reggae dubs, they still have some sort of song title connection to the original song title names.

Note ### = 12" record included free with the original album

== Personnel ==
UB40

- Jim Brown – drums
- Earl Falconer – bass guitar
- Ali Campbell – rhythm guitar
- Robin Campbell – lead guitar
- Michael Virtue – keyboards
- Norman Hassan – syn percussion, trombone, congas
- Brian Travers – saxophone
- Astro – trumpet

Production

- Produced by UB40 and Ray "Pablo" Falconer
- Recorded at the Music Centre, Wembley
- Pete Wandless – engineer
