= Rat in the Kitchen =

Studio album by UB40
- Released: 28 July 1986
- Genre: Reggae
- Length: 43:06
- Label: DEP / Virgin / A&M (US)
- Producer: UB40

UB40 chronology
Baggariddim (1985)	Rat in the Kitchen (1986)	The Best of UB40 - Volume One (1987)

Singles from Rat in the Kitchen
- 1. "Sing Our Own Song" Released: 1986; 2. "All I Want to Do" Released: 1986; 3. "Rat in Mi Kitchen" Released: 1987

Professional ratings
Review scores
Source	Rating
AllMusic	4.5/5 stars
Christgau's Record Guide	B+
Encyclopedia of Popular Music	3/5 stars
The Great Rock Discography	7/10
MusicHound	3.5/5
Los Angeles Times	favourable
Record Mirror	4/5
Rolling Stone	favourable
The Rolling Stone Album Guide	3.5/5 stars
Smash Hits	6/10

Rat in the Kitchen is the seventh album by UB40, released in July 1986. This album contained two UK hits, "Sing Our Own Song" (UK No. 5 in 1986) and "Rat in Mi Kitchen" (UK No. 12 in 1987). The album itself reached 8 in the UK album charts in 1986 staying in the charts for twenty weeks. The album provoked a positive reception from critics.

== Reception ==
AllMusic said the album was "as usual, a tuneful collection of reggae" and later described the album as "edgy".

== Track listing ==
All tracks composed by UB40

1. "All I Want to Do" – 5:33
2. "You Could Meet Somebody" – 4:52
3. "Tell It Like It Is" – 3:36
4. "The Elevator" – 3:25
5. "Watchdogs" – 4:18
6. "Rat in Mi Kitchen" – 6:58
7. "Looking Down at My Reflection" – 3:27
8. "Don't Blame Me" – 3:36
9. "Sing Our Own Song" – 7:21

== Personnel ==
- The guest vocalists who appeared on the album were Mo Birch, Jaki Graham & Ruby Turner
- Herb Alpert (co-founder of A&M Records) played trumpet on "Rat in Mi Kitchen"

== Charts ==
=== Weekly charts ===
1986–87 weekly chart performance for Rat in the Kitchen
Chart (1986–87)	Peak position
Australian Albums (Kent Music Report)	51
Canada Top Albums/CDs (RPM)	37
Dutch Albums (Album Top 100)	3
European Albums (Music & Media)	37
New Zealand Albums (RMNZ)	4
Swiss Albums (Schweizer Hitparade)	21
UK Albums (Official Charts)	8
US Billboard 200	53

=== Year-end charts ===
1986 year-end performance for Rat in the Kitchen
Chart (1986)	Position
Dutch Albums (Album Top 100)	37
New Zealand Albums (RMNZ)	45

1987 year-end performance for Rat in the Kitchen
Chart (1987)	Position
Dutch Albums (Album Top 100)	39

== Certifications and sales ==
Region	Certification	Certified units/sales
Canada (Music Canada)	Gold	50,000^{^}
Netherlands (NVPI)	Gold	50,000^{^}
New Zealand (RMNZ)	Gold	7,500^{^}
United Kingdom (BPI)	Gold	100,000^{^}
^{^} Shipments figures based on certification alone.
