= DEP International =

Defunct British record label founded by the band UB40

DEP International Ltd.
- DEP International logo
- Parent company: Universal Music Group
- Founded: 1980
- Founder: UB40
- Defunct: April 2008
- Distributor: Virgin Records; A&M Records
- Country of origin: United Kingdom
- Location: Digbeth, Birmingham

Dep International was a British record label founded in 1980 by members of British group UB40. It specialised in reggae and dub music. The label went into administration in October 2006 and into insolvent liquidation in April 2008. It was based in DEP International Studios in Digbeth, Birmingham.

== History ==
DEP International was formed in 1980 by members of UB40 to keep control over their record output and to release tracks by other artists. A worldwide distribution deal was struck with Virgin Records in 1982. It was the first label to release a dub album; Present Arms in Dub, which appeared in the British pop charts. They also had the first commercial application of a British method of mass-producing holograms with the limited-edition version of UB44 having a hologram covering the record sleeve. Although the label was wound-up in 2007, in 2011 five founder members of the group and directors of the label, had bankruptcy proceedings started against them relating to debts of the record label. The five named were Robin Campbell, Brian Travers, Terence Wilson, Norman Hassan and James Brown.

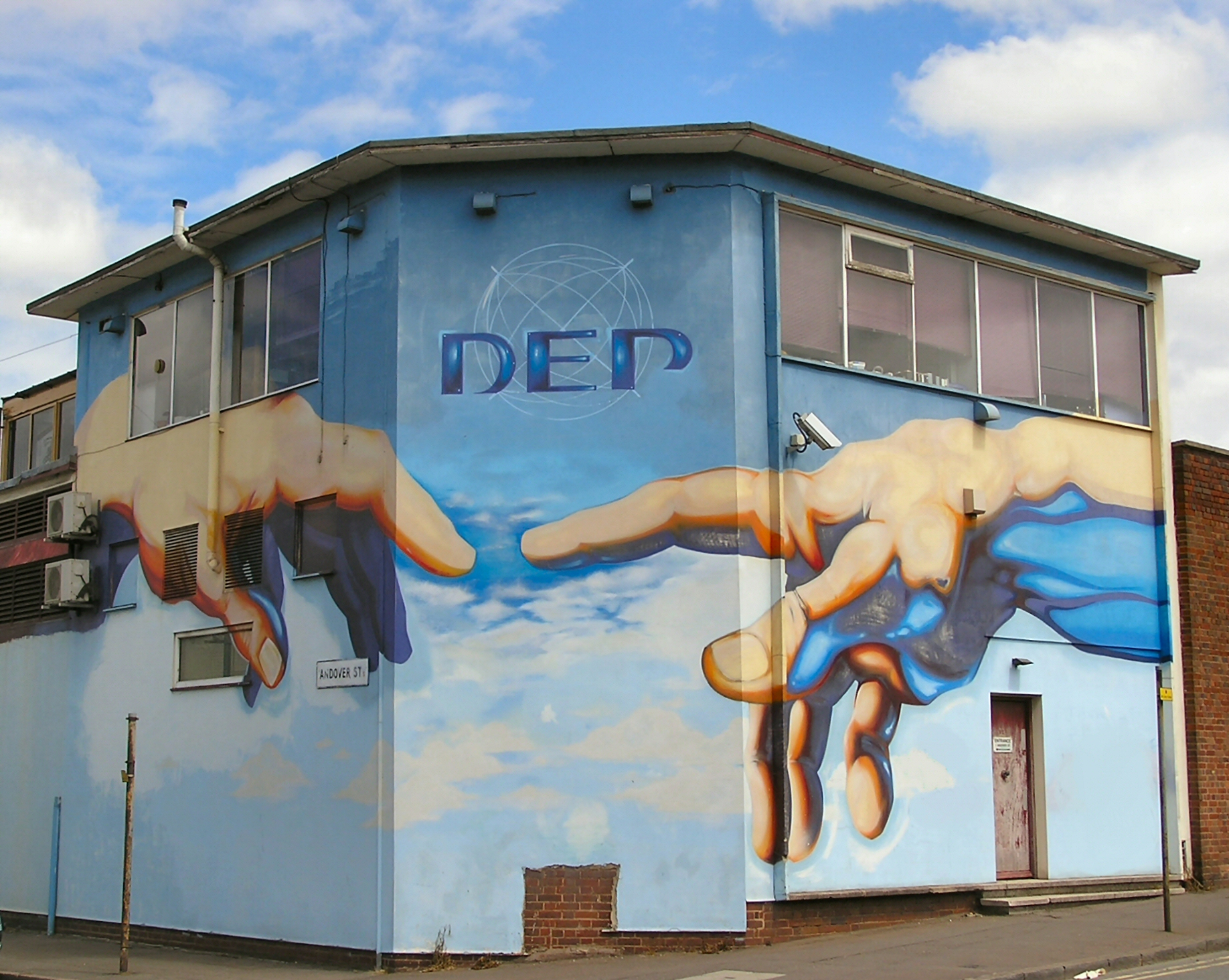
DEP Andover St. Birmingham April 2005
