= Toots and the Maytals discography =

Band discography

- Studio albums: 24
- EPs: 6
- Live albums: 7
- Compilation albums: 21
- Singles: 137 (of which 49 are split)
- Box sets: 1

This is the discography of Jamaican reggae group Toots and the Maytals, including their releases as 'the Maytals' as well as the solo discography of their lead singer Toots Hibbert.

== Albums ==
=== Studio albums ===
Title	Album details	Peak chart positions				
Title	Album details	FRA	SWI	UK	US	US Reggae
Never Grow Old	Released: 1964; Label: Studio One, Ska Beat; Formats: LP	—	—	—	—	—
The Sensational Maytals	Released: 1965; Label: BMN; Formats: LP	—	—	—	—	—
Sweet and Dandy	Released: 1969; Label: Beverley's; Formats: LP	—	—	—	—	—
Monkey Man	Released: 1970; Label: Trojan; Formats: LP	—	—	—	—	—
Greatest Hits	Released: 1971; Label: Beverley's; Formats: LP	—	—	—	—	—
Slatyam Stoot	Released: 1972; Label: Dynamic Sounds; Formats: LP	—	—	—	—	—
Funky Kingston	Released: March 1973; Label: Dragon; Formats: LP, MC	—	—	—	—	—
From the Roots	Released: 1973; Label: Trojan; Formats: LP; Recorded in 1970	—	—	—	—	—
Roots Reggae	Released: 1974; Label: Dynamic Sounds; Formats: LP	—	—	—	—	—
In the Dark	Released: September 1974; Label: Dynamic Sounds; Formats: LP, MC	—	—	—	—	—
Reggae Got Soul	Released: April 1976; Label: Dynamic Sounds, Island; Formats: LP, MC, 8-track	—	—	—	157	—
Toots Presents the Maytals	Released: 1977; Label: Chin Randys, State; Formats: LP	—	—	—	—	—
Pass the Pipe	Released: April 1979; Label: Tuff Gong, Island, Mango; Formats: LP	—	—	—	—	—
Just Like That	Released: March 1980; Label: Island, Mango; Formats: LP, MC	—	—	—	—	—
Knock Out!	Released: November 1981; Label: Sonic Sounds, Island, Mango; Formats: LP, MC	—	—	—	—	—
Toots in Memphis	Released: September 1988; Label: Sonic Sounds, Island, Mango; Formats: CD, LP, MC; Toots Hibbert solo album	—	—	—	—	—
Recoup	Released: 4 November 1997; Label: Artists Only!; Formats: CD	—	—	—	—	—
Ska Father	Released: 4 August 1998; Label: Artists Only!; Formats: CD	—	—	—	—	—
World Is Turning	Released: 29 July 2003; Label: D&F; Formats: CD	—	—	—	—	—
True Love	Released: 6 April 2004; Label: V2; Formats: CD, 2×LP, MC	36	84	163	177	2
Light Your Light	Released: 28 August 2007; Label: Fantasy; Formats: CD	—	—	—	—	9
Flip and Twist	Released: 20 April 2010; Label: D&F Music; Formats: CD, digital download	—	—	—	—	11
Pressure Drop – The Golden Tracks	Released: 25 January 2011; Label: Cleopatra/Purple Pyramid; Formats: CD, LP, digital download; Re-recordings	—	—	—	—	—
Got to Be Tough	Released: 28 August 2020; Label: Trojan Jamaica/BMG; Formats: CD, LP, digital download	—	—	—	—	9
"—" denotes releases that did not chart or were not released in that territory.

=== Live albums ===
Title	Album details	Peak chart positions
Title	Album details	US Reggae
Live	Released: 30 September 1980; Label: Toots, Island, Mango; Formats: LP, MC	—
Live at Reggae Sunsplash	Released: 1983; Label: Sunsplash, Vista Sounds; Formats: LP, MC	—
An Hour Live	Released: 1990; Label: Genes; Formats: CD, MC	—
Live in London	Released: 19 February 1999; Label: Trojan; Formats: 2×CD	—
Live at Red Rocks	Released: 2000; Label: PRG/Allah Son; Formats: CD	—
Unplugged on Strawberry Hill	Released: 7 February 2012; Label: Phree Music/Isis Productions; Formats: CD+DVD, digital download	9
Live!	Released: 4 December 2012; Label: Island; Formats: CD	—
"—" denotes releases that did not chart.

=== Compilation albums ===
Title	Album details	Peak chart positions	
Title	Album details	US	US Reggae
Prince Buster Record Shack Presents – The Original Golden Oldies Vol. 3	Released: September 1973; Label: Prince Buster; Formats: LP	—	—
Funky Kingston	Released: September 1975; Label: Island/Mango; Formats: LP, MC, 8-track; Revision of eponymous studio album, adding tracks from In the Dark and the single "Pressure Drop"	164	4 (Note: Charted in 2021)
The Best of Toots and the Maytals	Released: 1979; Label: Trojan; Formats: LP, MC	—	—
Reggae Greats	Released: 7 July 1984; Label: Island, Mango; Formats: CD, LP, MC	—	—
Do the Reggae 1966–70	Released: 1988; Label: Attack; Formats: LP	—	—
A Reggae Collection	Released: 1992; Label: Essex Entertainment; Formats: CD	—	—
The Collection	Released: 1995; Label: Spectrum Music; Formats: CD	—	—
Time Tough – The Anthology	Released: 18 June 1996; Label: Island Jamaica; Formats: 2×CD, 2×MC	—	—
The Very Best of Toots & the Maytals	Released: 19 August 1997; Label: Music Club; Formats: CD	—	—
Jamaican Monkey Man	Released: 15 September 1998; Label: Recall 2cd; Formats: 2×CD	—	—
The Very Best of Toots & the Maytals	Released: 25 April 2000; Label: Island; Formats: CD	—	4 (Note: Charted in 2020)
20 Massive Hits	Released: 25 April 2000; Label: Metro; Formats: CD	—	—
Fever	Released: 2000; Label: Metrodome; Formats: CD	—	—
54-46 Was My Number – Anthology 1964 to 2000	Released: November 2001; Label: Metro; Formats: CD	—	—
Sweet and Dandy: The Best of Toots & the Maytals	Released: 22 October 2002; Label: Trojan; Formats: CD	—	—
This Is Crucial Reggae	Released: 8 June 2004; Label: Sanctuary; Formats: CD	—	—
Pressure Drop – The Definitive Collection	Released: 21 April 2005; Label: Trojan; Formats: 2×CD	—	—
The Essential Collection	Released: June 2006; Label: Metro Doubles/Union Square Music; Formats: 2×CD	—	—
Reggae Legends	Released: 10 June 2008; Label: Trojan/Universal Music Group; Formats: 2×CD	—	—
Pressure Drop – The Best of Toots and the Maytals	Released: 18 June 2012; Label: Universal UMC/Island; Formats: 2×CD	—	—
The Best of the Maytals	Released: 6 May 2016; Label: Trojan/BMG; Formats: 2×CD, digital download	—	—
"—" denotes releases that did not chart or were not released in that territory.

=== Box sets ===
Title	Album details
Roots Reggae – The Classic Jamaican Albums	Released: October 2005; Label: Trojan; Formats: 6×CD

== EPs ==
Title	Album details	Peak chart positions
Title	Album details	UK
Toots & the Maytals E.P.	Released: 25 July 1980; Label: Island; Formats: 7"; UK-only release	—
Classic Tracks	Released: November 1988; Label: Classic Tracks; Formats: CD; Split EP with Bob Marley; UK-only release	—
Pressure Drop	Released: April 1989; Label: Mango; Formats: 7", 12"; Split EP with other reggae artists; UK-only release	86
Acoustically Live at Music Millennium	Released: 25 July 2006; Label: Junketboy; Formats: CD; US and Canada-only release	—
Christmas Specials	Released: 13 December 2011; Label: D&F Music; Formats: CD, digital download	—
Ska Never Grow Old	Released: 15 August 2012; Label: D&F Music; Formats: digital download	—
"—" denotes releases that did not chart.

== Singles ==
This list of singles is not in chronological order due to a lack of information and because many Jamaican releases did not have catalogue numbers. All singles refer to the Jamaican releases unless otherwise noted. This first table features solely singles where both sides are by Toots & the Maytals. The second table comprises split singles featuring the group, as there have been numerous releases of this sort. The final third table is solo singles by lead singer Toots Hibbert.

Title	Year	Peak chart positions	
Title	Year	NZ	UK
"Helping Hands" / "Hallelujah"	1963	—	—
"Six and Seven Books of Moses" / "Fly Butterfly"	1963	—	—
"I'll Never Grow Old" / "Irene"	1963	—	—
"Just Got to Be" / "You Make Me Do"	1963	—	—
"Fever" / "Cheer Up"	1963	—	—
"This Way" / "Study War (No More)"	1963	—	—
"Life Could Be a Dream" / "I Am in Love"	1963	—	—
"Christmas Season" / "Let's Kiss"	1963	—	—
"Hurry Up" / "Love Divine"	1964	—	—
"Dog War" (with Prince Buster's All Stars) / "Little Flea"	1964	—	—
"Not Too Old to Learn" / "Domino" (both with Prince Buster)	1964	—	—
"I Got a Pain" / "I Love You So"	1964	—	—
"West Road" / Light of the World" (both with C. Campbell)	1964	—	—
"John James" / "Lost Penny"	1964	—	—
"Hey Hey Girl" / "Are You Mine"	1964	—	—
"Heaven Declair" / "Love Lane"	1964	—	—
"He'll Provide" / "Give Me Your Love"	1964	—	—
"Daddy" / "It's You"	1964	—	—
"My Daily Food" / "One Look" (both with the Skatalites)	1964	—	—
"Judgement Day" / "Goodbye Jane"	1964	—	—
"He Is Real" / "Jamaica Ska" (both with Prince Buster and the Ska Busters)	1964	—	—
"You Got Me Spinning" / "Lovely Walk" (UK-only release)	1964	—	—
"Down By the Riverside" / "This Way" (UK-only release; as the Vikings)	1964	—	—
"Treat Me Bad" / "Sitting on Top" (UK-only release; as the Vikings)	1964	—	—
"Come into My Parlour" / "I Am in Love" (UK-only release; as the Vikings)	1964	—	—
"He's the Greatest" / "Someone Going to Call" (UK-only release; as the Flames)	1964	—	—
"When I Get Home" / "Neither Silver Nor Gold" (UK-only release; as the Flames)	1964	—	—
"Broadway Jungle" / "Beat Lied" (UK-only release; as the Flames)	1964	—	—
"Never You Change" / "What's on Your Mind?"	1965	—	—
"You You You" / "Love Is a Special Feeling"	1965	—	—
"Peggy" / "Tell Me You Love Me"	1965	—	—
"My New Name" / "It's No Use"	1965	—	—
"When I Laugh" / "I Know"	1965	—	—
"Let's Jump" / "Joy and Jean"	1965	—	—
"Tell Me the Reason" / "Please Don't Leave Me"	1965	—	—
"Hilly Billy" / "You're Mine"	1965	—	—
"If You Act This Way" / "You Make Me Feel the Way I Do" (both with Byron Lee and the Dragonaires)	1965	—	—
"Bam-Bam" / "So Mad in Love" (both with Byron Lee and the Dragonaires)	1966	—	—
"Ain't Got No Tip" / "I'm a Big Man"	1967	—	—
"Just Tell Me" / "Reborn"	1968	—	—
"Bim Today – Bam Tomorrow" / "Hold On"	1968	—	—
"School Days" (with Beverley''s All Stars) / "Big Man" (UK-only release)	1968	—	—
"Scare Him" / "You Are a Traitor"	1968	—	—
"Alidina" / "Hold On"	1968	—	—
"Sweet and Dandy" / "Oh – Yea"	1969	—	—
"Monkey Man" / "Day and Night"	1969	—	47
"Bla, Bla, Bla" / "Reborn"	1970	—	—
"Water Melon" / "She's My Scorcher"	1970	—	—
"Dr. Lester" / "Sun, Moon and Stars"	1970	—	—
"54-46 Was My Number" / "The Man" (US-only release)	1972	—	—
"Louie Louie" / "Pressure Drop '72"	1972	—	—
"Pomp and Pride" / "Pomp and Pride Part 2"	1972	—	—
"Country Road" / "Version"	1972	—	—
"Daddy" / "It Was Written Down"	1972	—	—
"Happy Christmas" / "If You Act This Way"	1972	—	—
"Sit Right Down" / "Screwface Underground" / "Pomp and Pride" (UK-only release)	1973	—	—
"In the Dark" / "Sailing On"	1973	—	—
"Image Get a Lick" / "Licking"	1976	—	—
"Reggae Got Soul" / "Dog War"	1976	—	55 (Note: Chart positions are from the "Star Breakers" list, an official extension of the BRMB Top 50 Singles Chart.)
"Never Go Down" / "In the Fire"	1976	—	—
"Give Us a Piece of the Action" / "Virgo"	1977	—	—
"Disco Reggae" / "Dub a Little Reggae" (UK and North America-only release)	1978	—	—
"Home Sweet Home" / "Confess Up Your Sins" (as Toots and Bredrens)	1978	—	—
"Take It from Me" / "Premature" (UK-only release)	1979	—	—
"Famine" / "Pass the Pipe" (UK and France-only release)	1979	—	—
"Israel Children" / "Turn It Up"	1979	—	—
"One Family" / "Missing You"	1979	—	—
"Chatty, Chatty" / "Turn It Up" (not released in Jamaica)	1980	—	—
"Just Like That" / "Gone with the Wind" (UK and France-only release)	1980	—	—
"Monkey Man" / "Hallelujah" (both live; UK-only release)	1980	—	—
"Papa D" / "You Never Know"	1981	—	—
"Papa Dee Mama Dear" / "Dilly Dally" (UK-only release)	1981	—	—
"Beautiful Woman" / "Careless Ethiopians" (Note: Released outside of Jamaica with the B-side "Beautiful Version".)	1981	1	—
"I Can See Clearly Now" / "Dilly Dally" (not released in Jamaica)	1981	—	—
"I Know We Can Make It" / "Spend a Weekend" (New Zealand-only release)	1982	—	—
"When I Remember" / "When I Remember (Version)"	1994	—	—
"More and More" / "Version"	1998	—	—
"Fool for You" / "Version"	1998	—	—
"Jungle" / "Hit Meck" (France-only release)	2003	—	—
"Bam Bam" (feat. Shaggy And Rahzel; not released in Jamaica)	2004	—	—
"True Love Is Hard to Find" (with Bonnie Raitt; US-only release)	2004	—	—
"I've Got a Woman (A Tribute to Ray Charles)" / "I've Got a Woman (Dancehall Mix)"	2006	—	—
"Sunny"	2011	—	—
"Reggae Day"	2014	—	—
"God Bless You" (feat. Suga Roy, Lil' Mo & Conrad Crystal)	2016	—	—
"A Song Call Marley"	2018	—	—
"Jamaica Anthem Party" (feat. Red Fox)	2020	—	—
"Freedom Train" (Samantha Ronson & Peter Nappi Remix)	2021	—	—
"—" denotes releases that did not chart or were not released in that territory.

=== Split singles ===
Title	Year	Peak chart positions
Title	Year	UK
"Matthew Mark" / "Royal Flush" (by Don Drummond)	1963	—
"Adams Apple" (by Tommy McCook) / "Everytime"	1963	—
"Fever Fever" / "Village Hap" (by Clue J. & the Blues Blasters)	1963	—
"When I Get Home" (with Beverley's All Stars) / "The Chapel" (by Vinley Gayle)	1964	—
"Another Chance" / "Always on Sunday" (by Frankie Anderson and His Group)	1964	—
"Baskin Hop" (by Lester Sterling & His Group) / "Shining Light"	1964	—
"Hot Cargo" (by Lester Sterling & His Group) / "Marching On"	1964	—
"A Man Who Knows" / "Tribute to Kennedy" (by Roland Alphonso with Lester Sterling & His Group)	1964	—
"Jack Ruby" (by Roland Alphonso) / "Hello Honey"	1964	—
"Ska Boo" (by Randy's All Stars) / "He Is the Greatest"	1964	—
"But I Do" (by Winston Stewart) / "Four Seasons"	1964	—
"I've Got a Pain" / "City Riot" (by Buster's All Star; UK-only release)	1964	—
"John and James" / "Sailing On" (by Theo Beckford; UK-only release)	1965	—
"Ska War" / "Perhaps" (by the Skatalites; UK-only release)	1965	—
"Pussy Cat" (by Stranger Cole with Baba Brooks Band) / "Sweet Sweet Jenny" (UK-only release)	1965	—
"Looking Down the Street" / "Blues Market" (by Prince Buster; UK-only release)	1965	—
"Wide Awake in a Dream" (by Philip James and the Blues Busters) / "Tell Me the Reason" (UK-only release)	1965	—
"My Destination" / "Spred Satin" (by Roland Alphonso)	1965	—
"My Darling" / "Best Friend" (by the Charmers)	1966	—
"Ska-ing West (Riding West)" (by Sir Lord Comic & His Cowboys) / "I Just Can't"	1966	—
"Struggle" / "Stream of Life" (by Roland Alphonso & Beverley's All Stars)	1968	—
"We Shall Overcome" / "Vat 7" (by Beverley's All Stars)	1968	—
"Do the Reggae" / "Take Five" (by Beverley's All Stars)	1968	—
"54-46 That's My Number" / "Dream-Land" (by Roland Alphonso & Beverley's All Stars)	1968	—
"Don't Trouble Trouble" / "Double Action" (by Beverley's All Stars)	1968	—
"Pressure Drop" / "Smoke Screen" (by Beverley's All Stars)	1969	—
"I Feel All Right" / "Version" (by Beverley's All Stars)	1970	—
"Peeping Tom" / "Version" (by Beverley's All Stars)	1970	—
"54-46 Was My Number" / "Version" (by Beverley's All Stars)	1970	53
"One Eye Enos" / "Version" (by Beverley's All Stars)	1971	—
"Monkey Girl" / "Version" (by Beverley's All Stars)	1971	—
"Teacher Teacher" / "Version" (by Beverley's All Stars)	1971	—
"Walk with Love" / "Version" (by Beverley's All Stars)	1971	—
"Johnny Cool Man" / "Version" (by Beverley's All Stars)	1971	—
"Thy Kingdom Come" / "Version" (by Beverley's All Stars)	1972	—
"Funky Funky" / "Version" (by Beverley's All Stars)	1972	—
"It Must Be True Love" / "Version" (by Beverley's All Stars)	1972	—
"Redemption Song" / "Version" (by the Dynamites)	1972	—
"Screwface Underground" / "Version" (by Internationals)	1973	—
"I Can't Believe" / "5446 Version" (by Internationals)	1974	—
"I Alone" / "Version" (by Internationals)	1974	—
"Time Tough" / "Version" (by Internationals)	1974	—
"You Don't Love Me (So Bad)" / "Version" (by Internationals)	1974	—
"Who Knows Better" / "Version" (by Hot Shot! All Star)	1974	—
"Reggae Got Soul" / "Version" (by the Dynamites)	1975	—
"Harvest Is Plenty" (by Denroy Morgan & Morgan Heritage) / "Lost Your Character"	1999	—
"Prayer of David" / "Horns of Blessing" (by Bobby Treasure)	1999	—
"Humble" / "Respect All Women" (by L.M.S.)	2002	—
"Be My Guest" (by Ben Harper & the Skatalites) / "I Want You to Know" (US-only release)	2007	—
"—" denotes releases that did not chart or were not released in that territory.

=== Toots Hibbert solo singles ===
Title	Year	Peak chart positions			
Title	Year	UK	BE (WA)	FRA	NZ
"Revival Time" / "Peace Perfect Peace" (South Africa-only release)	1981	—	—	—	—
"Spiritual Healing" / "Spiritual Healing (Instrumental)"	1983	—	—	—	—
"Hard Time Situation" / "Version"	1985	—	—	—	—
"Walk Away with Love" (with Denroy Morgan) / "Version"	1986	—	—	—	—
"Knock on Wood" / "Love the Rain" (Australia and New Zealand-only release)	1988	—	—	—	43
"Hard to Handle" / "54-46 (That's My Number)" (UK-only release)	1989	92	—	—	—
"Irie" (with Scotty) / "Irie (Version)"	1990	—	—	—	—
"54/46" (Buju Banton feat. Toots Hibbert) / "54/46 (Remix Version)"	1997	—	—	—	—
"Broadway Jungle" / "Broadway Jungle" (Europe-only release)	2000	77	—	—	—
"Start Me Up" / "Start Me Up (Version)"	2001	—	—	—	—
"Look in the Mirror" (Marathonians feat. Toots; France-only release)	2002	—	—	—	—
"Pumps & Pride" (with Anthony B) / "Version"	2002	—	—	—	—
"I'm a Worried Man" (Willie Nelson feat. Toots Hibbert; not released in Jamaica)	2005	—	—	—	—
"Reggae Reggae" (with Queen Ifrica) / "Version"	2007	—	—	—	—
"Adieu Haïti" / "Transibérien" (Raphaël feat. Toots; France-only release)	2008	—	27	22	—
"Don't You Try" (Chainska Brassika feat. Toots Hibbert; UK-only release)	2016	—	—	—	—
"Come and Get It" (with Sly & Robbie)	2017	—	—	—	—
"—" denotes releases that did not chart or were not released in that territory.
