= Pass the Pipe =

Studio album by Toots and the Maytals
- Released: 1979
- Genre: Reggae
- Label: Mango

Toots and the Maytals chronology
Toots Presents The Maytals (1977)	Pass the Pipe (1979)	Just Like That (1980)

Pass the Pipe is an album by the Jamaican reggae band Toots and the Maytals. It was released in 1979 on Mango Records.

== Critical reception ==
Professional ratings
Review scores
Source	Rating
AllMusic	2.5/5 stars
Robert Christgau	B+
DownBeat	3.5/5 stars
The Encyclopedia of Popular Music	3/5 stars
The Rolling Stone Album Guide	3.5/5 stars

New York praised the "raspy lushness" of Toots Hibbert's vocals. The New York Times wrote: "Although customarily raucous, the Maytals' reggae retains a marked gospel intensity. As such, Pass the Pipe does not represent a new direction so much as a greater concentration on one aspect of Toots and company's mature gifts. Highly recommended." The Bay State Banner thought that the "guitar and bass men shun the usual metallic riffing in favor of a reedy vegetable sound that purrs and mushes against your speakers." Stereo Review deemed Pass the Pipe "a recording of special merit."

Dave Thompson, in Reggae & Caribbean Music, thought that on Pass the Pipe "jazz influences creep into the now solidly soulful brew."

== Track listing ==
1. "Famine" - 3:13
2. "Inside Outside" - 4:00
3. "Feel Free" - 4:38
4. "Get Up, Stand Up" - 6:18
5. "No Difference Here" - 5:42
6. "Rhythm Down Low" - 3:29
7. "My Love Is So Strong" - 4:35
8. "Take It from Me (No Money, No Love) - 6:20

== Personnel ==
- Toots Hibbert – vocals
- Ansell Collins – piano
- Raleigh Gordon – backing vocals
- Jerry Mathias – backing vocals
- Rad Bryan – lead guitar
- Ranchy McLean – bass
- Hux Brown – rhythm guitar
- Paul Douglas – drums
- Winston Wright – organ
