= Marching On =

Marching On may refer to:

- Marching On, a 1927 novel by James Boyd
- Marching On!, a 1943 American race film directed and written by Spencer Williams
- "Marchin On", a 2010 song by One Republic
- "Marching On" (Dami Im song), 2020
- "Marching On", single by The Alarm, MacDonald & Peters from Declaration, 1982
- "Marching On", a 1979 song by BZN
- "Marching On", a 1964 song by The Maytals
