= Reggae Got Soul =

Studio album by Toots and the Maytals
- Released: July 1976
- Studio: Harry J's, Dynamic Sounds, Basing Street
- Genre: Reggae
- Length: 35:00
- Label: Island
- Producer: Chris Blackwell (tracks: B1), Joe Boyd (A1 to A5, B2 to B5), Warrick Lyn

Toots and the Maytals chronology
In the Dark (1973)	Reggae Got Soul (1976)	Toots Presents The Maytals (1977)

Reggae Got Soul is an album by the Jamaican reggae group Toots and the Maytals, released in July 1976 by Island Records.

== Critical reception ==
Professional ratings
Review scores
Source	Rating
AllMusic	3.5/5 stars
Christgau's Record Guide	B+

Reviewing in Christgau's Record Guide: Rock Albums of the Seventies (1981), Robert Christgau wrote: "In Toots the physical voice is all but equivalent to the artistic 'voice,' the way that term is applied to poets sometimes, and all its warmth, humor, and vivacity come through here. But what has made Toots doubly impressive is the amazing hit songs his voice was attached to. For starters: 'Sweet and Dandy,' '5446 Was My Number,' 'Monkey Man,' and 'African Doctor.' None of these has been released on an American Maytals album, and nothing on this album, not even 'Rasta Man' or 'True Love Is Hard to Find,' equals any of them."

The title track was released a single in Jamaica and the US in 1975 and in the UK in 1976.

== Track listing ==
All songs written by Frederick "Toots" Hibbert except as indicated.

Side one

1. "Rasta Man" – 5:56
2. "Premature" – 3:11
3. "So Bad" – 2:57
4. "Six and Seven Books" – 3:30
5. "I Shall Sing" (Van Morrison) – 2:41

Side two

1. "Reggae Got Soul" (Warwick Lyn) – 3:08
2. "Everybody Needs Lovin" – 3:10
3. "Living in the Ghetto" – 3:40
4. "True Love Is Hard to Find" – 4:14
5. "Never You Change" – 3:11

== Charts ==
Year	chart	Peak positions
Year	chart	US Mod
1976	Billboard 200	157

== Personnel ==
Musicians

- Frederick "Toots" Hibbert – vocals
- Ralphus "Raleigh" Gordon – vocals
- Nathaniel "Jerry" Matthias – vocals
- Dudu Pukwana, Ray Allen – alto saxophone
- Jackie Jackson – bass
- Paul Douglas – drums
- "Chicago Steve" (track B1, B2) – harmonica
- Lynford "Hux" Brown, Junior Kerr – lead guitar
- Jean Alain Roussel – Hammond B3, keyboards
- Emmanuel Rentzos, Pablo Black (track A1), Sonny Binns, Steve Winwood (track B3), Winston Wright – organ
- Fitzroy "Brother" James, Bruce Rowland, Denzil Laing, Tony Uter – percussion
- Gladstone Anderson, Steve Winwood (track A2) – piano
- Earl "Chinna" Smith, Radcliffe "Dougie" Bryan, Willie Lindo – rhythm guitar
- George Lee, Tommy McCook – tenor saxophone
- Jerome Francis, Rico Rodriguez – trombone
- Bobby Ellis, Eddie Quansah – trumpet

Technical

- Eckford/Stimpson – design
- John Burns, Ronald Logan, Sylvan Morris – engineers
- John Burns, Keith Harwood – mixer
- Larry Cohen, Marilyn Rickard, Roberto Morrison – photography
