= In the Dark (Toots and the Maytals album) =

Studio album by Toots & the Maytals
- Released: September 1974
- Recorded: 1973
- Studio: Dynamic Sounds, Kingston, Jamaica
- Genre: Reggae
- Length: 39:15
- Label: Dragon
- Producer: Byron Lee (exec.); Warwick Lyn; Neville Hinds; Carlton Lee

Toots & the Maytals chronology
Funky Kingston (1972)	In the Dark (1974)	Reggae Got Soul (1976)

Professional ratings
Review scores
Source	Rating
AllMusic	4.5/5 stars
Rolling Stone	5/5 stars

In the Dark is the second international album release by the reggae singing group Toots and the Maytals, issued in Jamaica and in the United Kingdom on Dragon Records, DRLS 5004, a subsidiary label owned by Chris Blackwell. It was released in September 1974.

== Content ==
To follow up Funky Kingston, label owner Blackwell returned Toots and the Maytals to Dynamic Sound Studios in Kingston for new recordings. Included were songs previously released as singles, "54-46 Was My Number" and "Pomp and Pride." Continuing interesting choices of cover material aimed at the English market, the Maytals included a version of the hit single by John Denver, "Take Me Home, Country Roads," which replaces West Virginia with West Jamaica in the lyric.

For a hybrid release of Funky Kingston for the United States, six songs from this album were substituted for five others from the original Jamaican version of Funky Kingston, adding in the 1969 "Pressure Drop" single. On March 25, 2003, In the Dark was released on compact disc by Universal complete in its original format, along with the Jamaican Funky Kingston album and the "Pressure Drop" single.

== Track listing ==
All tracks written by Frederick "Toots" Hibbert except where noted.

=== Side one ===
1. "Got to Be There" – 3:06
2. "In the Dark" (F. Hibbert, E. Chin) – 2:48
3. "Having a Party" – 2:48
4. "Time Tough" – 4:23
5. "I See You" (B. Davidson) – 3:16
6. "Take a Look in the Mirror" – 3:17

=== Side two ===
1. "Take Me Home, Country Roads" (John Denver, Taffy Nivert, Bill Danoff) – 3:23
2. "Fever" – 2:26
3. "Love's Gonna Walk Out on Me" – 3:15
4. "Revolution" – 3:31
5. "54-46" – 3:24
6. "Sailing On" – 3:35

== Personnel ==
- Frederick "Toots" Hibbert – vocals
- Ralphus "Raleigh" Gordon – vocals
- Nathaniel "Jerry" Matthias – vocals
- Neville Hinds – keyboards
- Hux Brown – guitar
- Jackie Jackson – bass
- Winston Grennan – drums
