= Toots in Memphis =

Studio album by Toots Hibbert
- Released: 1988
- Studio: Ardent
- Genre: Reggae, R&B, soul
- Label: Mango
- Producer: Jim Dickinson

Toots Hibbert chronology
Reggae Greats (1984)	Toots in Memphis (1988)	Do the Reggae 1966–70 (1988)

Toots in Memphis is an album by the Jamaican musician Toots Hibbert. Released in 1988, Toots in Memphis was recorded without the Maytals. The majority of the album's tracks are covers of American R&B songs.

The album was nominated for a Grammy Award for "Best Reggae Recording". Toots supported the album by embarking on a three-month tour of North America, where he was backed by his late-1980s lineup of the Maytals.

== Production ==
Recorded in 10 days at Ardent Studios, in Memphis, the album was produced by Jim Dickinson. The backing band included the rhythm section of Sly and Robbie, with Memphis musicians such as guitarist Teenie Hodges; Michael Chung contributed as well.

The concept for what became Toots in Memphis transformed over the years. A few years before, Toots had pondered making a roots R&B album with Ry Cooder. The idea for a Memphis album originated in part with Chris Blackwell and record executive Jerry Rappaport, both of whom advocated for some of the song selections. At one point Rappaport had wanted Toots to record in New Orleans with the Neville Brothers; Toots, while in the studio with Dickinson, was somewhat annoyed that he couldn't record more of his original songs.

"Love the Rain" is a version of Ann Peebles's "I Can't Stand the Rain". "See It My Way" is the only song that Toots had a hand in writing.

== Critical reception ==
Professional ratings
Review scores
Source	Rating
AllMusic	4.5/5 stars
Robert Christgau	B+
The Encyclopedia of Popular Music	3/5 stars
The Philadelphia Inquirer	3/4 stars
The Rolling Stone Album Guide	4/5 stars

Spin wrote that, "here the concept of 'cover' is transformed to 're-cover'—recover past songs to make a musical future." Robert Christgau thought that, "like all aging soul men, he can no longer flush out the gravel at will, but the vocalese is incorrigibly exuberant, the material ranges within the concept, and Sly & Robbie synthesize the unimaginable groove you'd expect." The Gazette noted that, "emotionally, Hibbert never loses his focus, even through a weeping performance of 'Love Attack' that would be maudlin were it not so heartfelt." The Sunday Times stated that, "here reggae has consciously come full circle, revisiting its own black American roots in the southern soul associated with the Stax label in Memphis."

The Chicago Tribune determined that "sinuous Memphis soul simply explodes when the added rhythmic push of reggae is put behind it"; the paper later named Toots in Memphis the best album of 1988. The Philadelphia Inquirer concluded that Toots "has made a reggae album that percolates without compensating, that swings without being bound to the horse-and-buggy rhythm." The St. Louis Post-Dispatch opined that Toots in Memphis "may be the best R&B and the best reggae album to come out this year." The Republican declared: "If you've been bored by scores of lounge bands slamming through 'Knock on Wood' or embarrassed for them as they attempted 'Love and Happiness', you're in for a treat, as Hibbert brings a new dimension to them and rekindles your interest."

AllMusic wrote that, "though Toots never quite takes these tunes away from Otis Redding, Al Green, James Carr, or any of the other masters who first recorded them, he never fails to put his own stamp on the material, and the result is one of the great cross-cultural party albums of all times."

== Track listing ==
No.	Title	Length
1.	"I've Got Dreams to Remember"
2.	"Knock on Wood"
3.	"Love and Happiness"
4.	"Love Attack"
5.	"Hard to Handle"
6.	"Love the Rain"
7.	"It's a Shame"
8.	"Precious, Precious"
9.	"Freedom Train"
10.	"See It My Way"
