= Funky Kingston =

Studio album by Toots and the Maytals
- Released: circa March / April 1973 (UK); 1975 (US)
- Recorded: 1972
- Studios: Dynamic Sounds, Kingston; Island, London
- Genre: Reggae
- Length: 34:56
- Labels: Dragon (Jamaica, U.K.); Mango (U.S.)
- Producers: Chris Blackwell, Warwick Lyn, Dave Bloxham

Toots and the Maytals chronology
Slatyam Stoot	Funky Kingston (1973)	In the Dark (1973)

Funky Kingston is the name of two albums by Jamaican reggae group Toots and the Maytals. The first was issued in Jamaica and the United Kingdom in 1973 on Dragon Records, a subsidiary label of Island Records, owned by Chris Blackwell. A different album, with the same cover and title, was issued in the United States in 1975 on Mango Records. That album was compiled from three previous Maytals albums by Island Records employee Danny Holloway and peaked at No. 164 on the Billboard 200. It was voted the eleventh best album of 1975 in the annual Pazz & Jop poll. In 2003, the American version was placed at number 378 on Rolling Stone's list of "The 500 Greatest Albums of All Time", 380 in a 2012 revised list and 344 in a 2020 revised list.

== Background ==
The Maytals had been consistent hit makers in Jamaica during the 1960s, and had even given the genre its name with their single "Do the Reggay". But when the music for Funky Kingston was recorded at Dynamic Sound Studios in Kingston, reggae music was little known outside of its native Jamaica, other than in musical circles. For instance, demonstrating unfamiliarity with the genre, a 1973 review in International Times called Funky Kingston's music "Jamaican rock'n'roll". Awareness of reggae began to change in 1972 with the release of the seminal film The Harder They Come, which became a cult hit that year in the UK, with its soundtrack featuring two songs by the Maytals. As he would with the Wailers the following year, producer Chris Blackwell tailored the Maytals for the international market on this album.

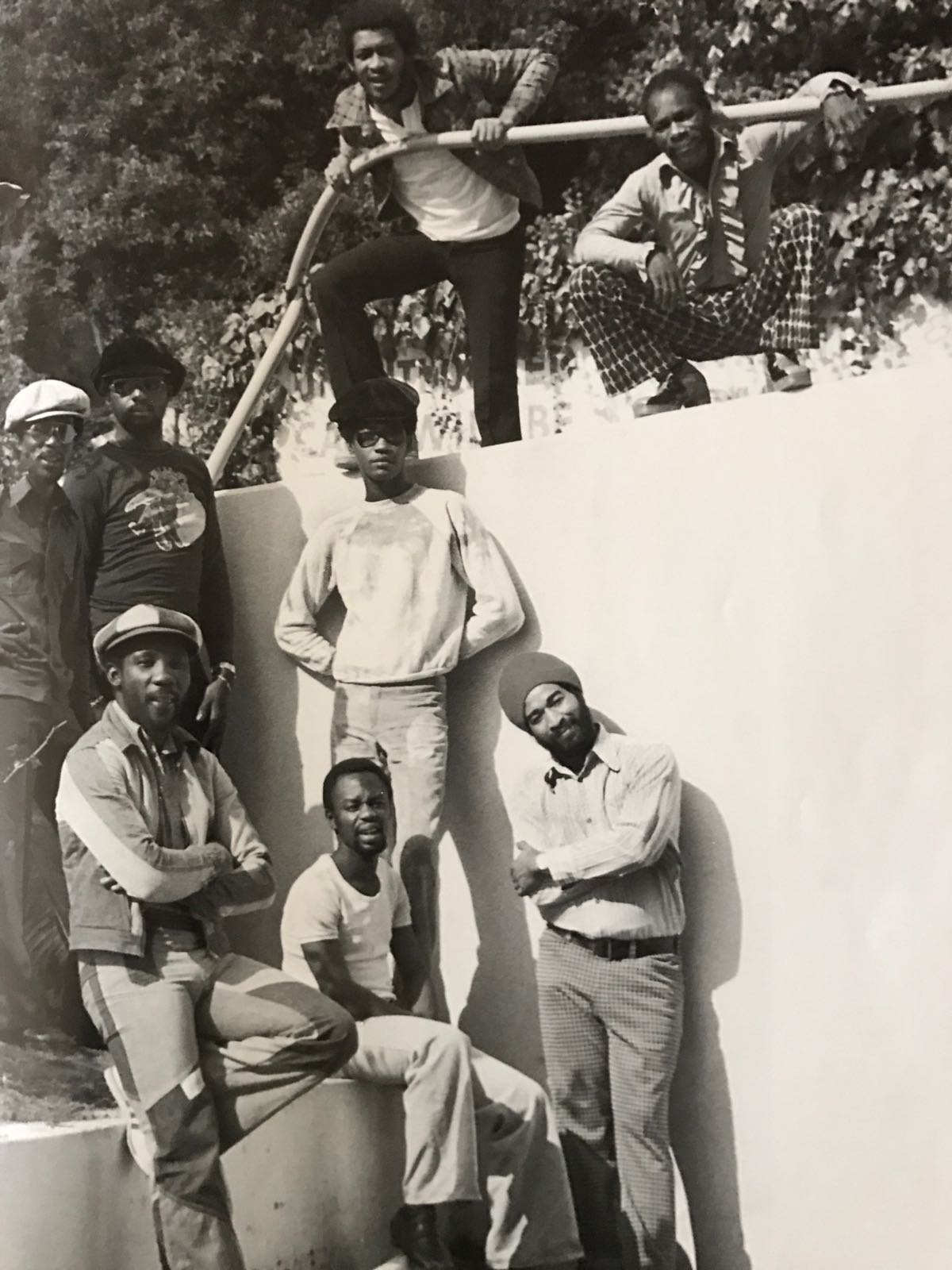
Toots and the Maytals circa 1976

== Music and lyrics ==
Funky Kingston's lyrics refer to the difficulties of being working-class, of living in the country in Jamaica, and celebrating life despite ongoing hardship.

In general, Funky Kingston is considered an authentic reflection of Jamaican music at the time. While other Jamaican recordings had additions by record producers in an effort to increase their international appeal, Blackwell made only minor additions to the recording. One notable addition is horn overdubs by the Sons of the Jungle, a Ghanaian band.

The album acknowledges American rhythm and blues with covers of songs by Ike Turner and Shep and the Limelites, along with a reggae take on Richard Berry's composition, "Louie Louie". The American release also contains a cover of John Denver's "Take Me Home, Country Roads", with lyrics slightly altered to refer to Jamaica. The album's title came from a suggestion by producer Chris Blackwell who noted the success of The Beginning of the End's 1971 semi-crossover hit "Funky Nassau", with the "funky" referencing an increasingly popular genre at the time.

== Release ==
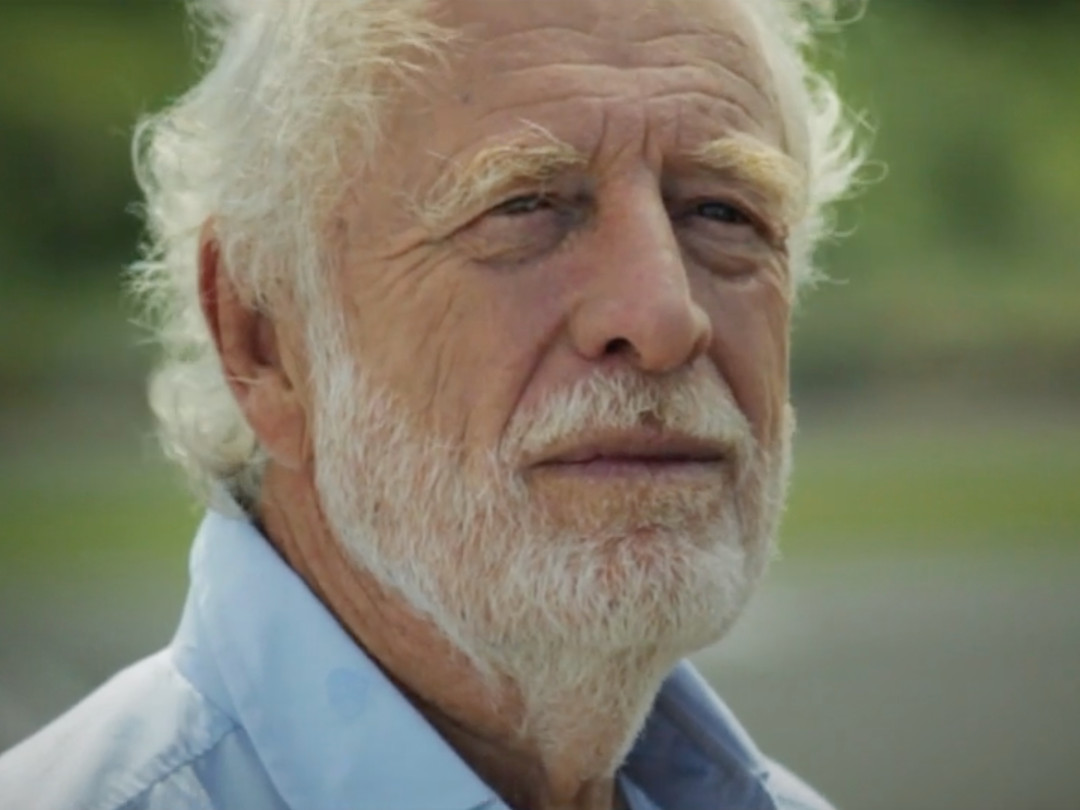
Producer Chris Blackwell

In 1975, a revised version of the album was released in the United States. It kept only three tracks from the Jamaican album, substituting six taken from the follow-up In the Dark, adding in the 1969 "Pressure Drop" single which had been previously issued on album with The Harder They Come.

On March 25, 2003, Funky Kingston was released on compact disc by Universal complete in its original format, along with the Jamaican In the Dark album and the "Pressure Drop" single.

== Reception ==
Professional ratings
Review scores
Source	Rating
AllMusic	4/5 stars
Christgau's Record Guide	A−
Pitchfork	9.0/10
Rolling Stone	5/5 stars
Sputnikmusic	4.0/5 stars

Given the significant differences between the two versions of this album, critical reception varies depending on which version is being reviewed. The reception of the US release invariably regards it as a classic given its inclusion in several "best of" lists. The original Rolling Stone review states that "this is the cream of their crop, with a couple of exceptions".

Funky Kingston, Toots and the Maytals’ first release to be distributed by Chris Blackwell’s Island Records label proved to be a critical triumph. Rock critic Lester Bangs, writing in Stereo Review, described the album as "perfection, the most exciting and diversified set of reggae tunes by a single artist yet released."

"Funky Kingston"
Funky Kingston audio sample

Reviewing the 1975 American release, Robert Christgau wrote in Christgau's Record Guide: Rock Albums of the Seventies (1981): "The quick way to explain the Maytals is to say that in reggae they're the Beatles to the Wailers' Rolling Stones. But how do I explain Toots himself? Well, he's the nearest thing to Otis Redding left on the planet: he transforms 'do re mi fa sol la ti do' into joyful noise. I wish he had real politics—any Jamaican who can only pray to God about this time tough hasn't ever been compelled to explore all his options—and lately his arrangements have been looser than I'd like, but this is a gift."

Toots Hibbert's vocals were widely praised on the 1975 release due to his "Motown inflections" that seems to, rather innovatively, bridge together the reggae genre with soul.

Funky Kingston was ranked at number 380 in Rolling Stone's 2012 list of greatest albums of all time, with the magazine saying, "Loose, funky, exuberant, Kingston is the quintessential document of Jamaica's greatest act after Bob Marley."

In a retrospective review in 2020, Pitchfork's Wayne Marshall wrote that Funky Kingston is more "reflective of the core Jamaican sound" than Bob Marley's music. He called Funky Kingston a "classic", saying that it "captured the country soul of roots reggae at its creative peak", and that it is a "wry testament to the shared circumstances of the black and working-class masses".

== Appearances in other media ==
The title track, "Funky Kingston", appears in the Grand Theft Auto: San Andreas video game soundtrack, on the fictitious radio station K-Jah West. "Funky Kingston" also appears in the Shark Tale video game soundtrack. It also features as the opening theme for the reality show Miami Ink. It was the basis for the "Funky Vodka" track, which in turn fueled "Don't Stop The Party". The song can be heard in the film Notes on a Scandal where the Hart family can be seen dancing to it. The song "Time Tough" was featured on the soundtrack for Tony Hawk's Project 8. Their version of "Louie Louie" from this album appears in the Coen Brothers' debut film Blood Simple.

== Track listing ==
All songs written by Frederick "Toots" Hibbert except as indicated.

=== Side one ===
1. "Sit Right Down" — 4:44
2. "Pomps and Pride" — 4:30
3. "Louie Louie" (Richard Berry) — 5:46
4. "I Can't Believe" (Ike Turner) — 3:29

=== Side two ===
1. "Redemption Song" — 3:26
2. "Daddy's Home" (James Sheppard, Clarence Bassett, Charles Baskerville) — 5:05
3. "Funky Kingston" — 4:54
4. "It Was Written Down" — 3:04

== 1975 track listing ==
=== Side one ===
1. "Time Tough" — 4:23
2. "In the Dark" (F. Hibbert, E. Chin) — 2:48
3. "Funky Kingston" — 4:54
4. "Love Is Gonna Let Me Down" — 3:15 listed as "Love's Gonna Walk Out on Me" on Jamaican release
5. "Louie Louie" (Richard Berry) — 5:46

=== Side two ===
1. "Pomp and Pride" — 4:30
2. "Got to Be There" — 3:06
3. "Country Road" (Bill Danoff, John Denver, Taffy Nivert) — 3:23
4. "Pressure Drop" — 3:46
5. "Sailin' On" — 3:35

== Personnel ==
- Frederick "Toots" Hibbert - vocals
- Ralphus "Raleigh" Gordon - vocals
- Nathaniel "Jerry" Matthias - vocals
- Radcliffe "Dougie" Bryan - guitar
- Neville Hinds - keyboards
- Jackie Jackson - bass
- Paul Douglas - drums

=== Additional musicians ===
- Winston Grennan - drums
- Sons of the Jungle - horns

== Charts ==
Chart (1976)	Peak position
Billboard Pop Albums	164
