= Do the Reggay =

1968 song which introduced the word Reggae

Single by the Maytals
- Released: 1968
- Genre: Reggae; rocksteady
- Length: 3:16
- Label: Beverley's (Jamaica); Pyramid Records (United Kingdom)
- Songwriter: Toots Hibbert
- Producer: Leslie Kong

"Do the Reggay" is a reggae song by the Maytals, written by Toots Hibbert, produced by Leslie Kong and released on Beverley's in Jamaica and Pyramid Records in the UK in 1968. It was the first popular song to use the word "reggae" and defined the developing genre by giving it its name. At that time, "reggay" had been the name of a passing dance fashion in Jamaica, but the song's connection of the word with the music itself led to its use for the style of music that developed from it.

Hibbert claimed in a BBC Radio 6 Music interview that he took the word from a slang term for a person who is a bit scruffy or not well-kempt.
