= Toots Hibbert =

Jamaican musician (1942–2020)

Toots Hibbert OJ
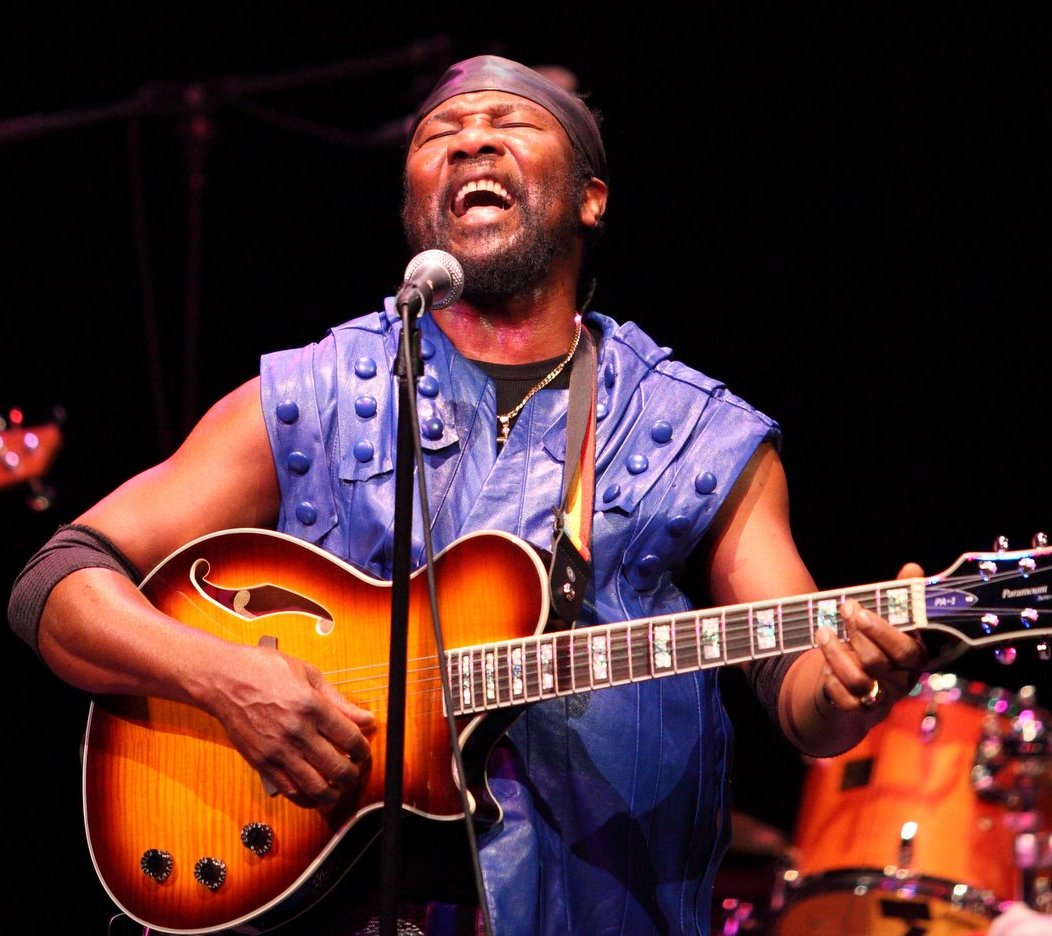
- Hibbert performing in 2010

Background information
- Born: Frederick Nathaniel Hibbert; 8 December 1942; May Pen, Colony of Jamaica
- Origin: Kingston, Jamaica
- Died: 11 September 2020 (aged 77) Kingston, Jamaica
- Genres: Ska; rocksteady; reggae; roots reggae; R&B; soul music
- Occupations: Singer; musician; songwriter; bandleader
- Instruments: Vocals; guitar; Hammond organ
- Years active: 1961–2020
- Formerly of: Toots and the Maytals

Frederick Nathaniel "Toots" Hibbert, OJ (8 December 1942 – 11 September 2020) was a Jamaican singer and songwriter who was the lead vocalist for the reggae and ska band Toots and the Maytals. A reggae pioneer, he performed for six decades and helped establish some of the fundamentals of reggae music. Hibbert's 1968 song "Do the Reggay" is widely credited as the genesis of the genre name reggae. His band's album True Love won a Grammy Award in 2005.

== Early life ==
Hibbert was born on 8 December 1942 in May Pen, Jamaica, the youngest of his siblings. Hibbert's parents were both strict Seventh-day Adventist preachers so he grew up singing gospel music in a church choir. Both parents died young and, by the age of 11, Hibbert was an orphan who went to live with his brother John in the Trenchtown neighborhood of Kingston. While working at a local barbershop, he met his future bandmates Raleigh Gordon and Jerry Matthias.

== Career ==
=== 1960s ===
Hibbert, a multi-instrumentalist, formed Toots and the Maytals in 1961. He could play every instrument used in his band and would later cite Otis Redding, Ray Charles, Wilson Pickett, and James Brown as key influences. According to Hibbert, Maytals is a reference to the Rastafari term for "do the right thing". There are also statements attributing the source of the name to Hibbert's hometown of May Pen. The band was originally a trio with Gordon and Mathias, and later added Jackie Jackson and Paul Douglas.

Much of Hibbert's early recorded output, such as "Hallelujah" (1963), reflects his Christian upbringing. He was also known to write about Rastafarian religious themes, and in an early Maytals song, "Six And Seven Books of Moses" (1963), he addressed the folk magic of obeah and its use of the occult literature of Biblical grimoires, such as the Sixth and Seventh Books of Moses.

The Maytals became one of the more popular vocal groups in Jamaica in the mid-1960s, recording with producers Coxsone Dodd, Prince Buster, Byron Lee, Ronnie Nasralla, and Leslie Kong. This success included winning Jamaica's National Popular Song Contest three times with songs Hibbert wrote: in 1966 with "Bam Bam", which won a national song competition, 1969 with "Sweet and Dandy" and 1972 with "Pomps & Pride".

In 1966, Hibbert was sentenced to 18 months in prison for possession of marijuana. This experience provided the inspiration for one of his best known songs, "54-46 That's My Number". Hibbert was one of the first artists to use the word "reggae" on a record, in 1968's "Do the Reggay".

The quick way to explain the Maytals is to say that in reggae they're the Beatles to the Wailers' the Rolling Stones. But how do I explain Toots himself? Well, he's the nearest thing to Otis Redding left on the planet: he transforms 'do re mi fa sol la ti do' into joyful noise.

— Christgau's Record Guide: Rock Albums of the Seventies (1981)

In his 2016 "The Rise of Reggae and the influence of Toots and the Maytals", Matthew Sherman wrote:

"In the winter of 1968, the cool rocksteady beat gave way to a faster, brighter, more danceable sound. Reggae was born. Toots heralded the new sound with the seminal, complex groove monster 'Do the Reggay' advertising 'the new dance, going around the town.' Toots wanted 'to do the Reggae, with you!' ... From '69 to '71, Toots could do no wrong recording for Leslie Kong. With the consistent nucleus of musicians, the Beverley's All-Stars (Jackie Jackson, Winston Wright, Hux Brown, Rad Bryan, Paul Douglas, and Winston Grennan) and The Maytals' brilliant harmonizing, Toots wrote and sang his unmistakable voice about every subject imaginable."

=== 1970s ===
The first Toots and the Maytals album released and distributed by Chris Blackwell's Island Records was Funky Kingston. Music critic Lester Bangs described the album in Stereo Review as "perfection, the most exciting and diversified set of reggae tunes by a single artist yet released." Chris Blackwell had a strong commitment to Toots and the Maytals, saying "I've known Toots longer than anybody – much longer than Bob [Bob Marley]. Toots is one of the purest human beings I've met in my life, pure almost to a fault."

In 1970, the band first charted overseas with "Monkey Man" reaching No. 47 in Britain.

Hibbert also appeared in the groundbreaking Jamaican film The Harder They Come, in which his band sings "Sweet and Dandy". The film's soundtrack included the Maytals' 1969 hit song "Pressure Drop". The Harder They Come features fellow musician and actor Jimmy Cliff in the leading role as Ivan, a character whose story resembles Hibbert's.

On 1 October 1975, Toots and the Maytals were broadcast live on KMET-FM as they performed at the Roxy Theatre in Los Angeles. This broadcast was re-mastered and released as an album titled Sailin' On via Klondike Records.

=== 1980s and 1990s ===
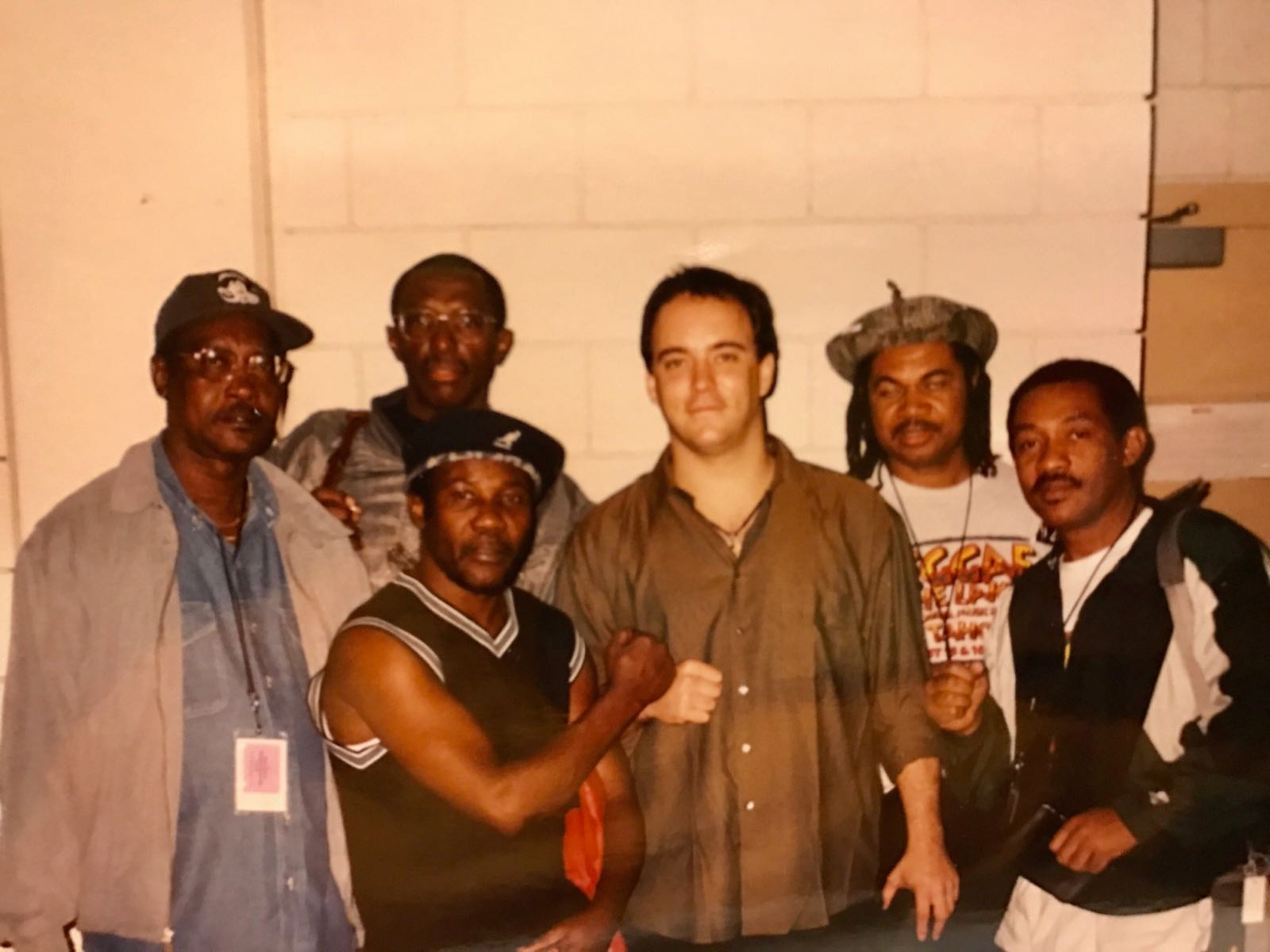
Toots and the Maytals with Dave Matthews when performing together in 1998

The band's 1980 performance at Hammersmith Palais in London was released as an album, Live, less than 24 hours after it was recorded, making it into the Guinness Book of World Records. The band released Knock Out! in 1981, after which the original Maytals trio broke. After a hiatus, Hibbert continued to tour as a solo artist. In 1988, he released Toots in Memphis, for which he earned his first Grammy nomination. Hibbert restarted his band in the mid-1990s without Gordon and Mathias.

=== 2000s ===
In 2004, Hibbert was featured in Willie Nelson's Outlaws and Angels. Hibbert carried on touring the world, and his band's True Love won the Grammy Award for Best Reggae Album in 2005. Nelson released a reggae album titled Countryman (2005) which featured Hibbert on the song "I'm a Worried Man". Hibbert was also featured in the music video for the song, which was filmed in Jamaica.

In 2006, Toots and the Maytals covered Radiohead's "Let Down" for the Easy Star All-Stars album Radiodread, a reggae version of the English rock band's OK Computer. At the end of the year, Hibbert joined Gov't Mule for their New Year's Eve concert, documented in their Dub Side of the Mule release.

In 2009, Hibbert collaborated with MCPR Music and Steel Pulse's Sidney Mills, who produced Jamaican percussionist Larry McDonald's album Drumquestra. His track is called "What about the Children?" The same year he also performed vocals with Iowa reggae band Public Property on their album Work to Do.

Hibbert was also a judge for the 10th annual Independent Music Awards to support independent artists' careers.

Hibbert collaborated with the U.S. southern rock/blues group, JJ Grey & Mofro. He is featured in their song, "The Sweetest Thing", on their album, Georgia Warhorse.

=== 2010s ===
In 2011, Hibbert was featured in the documentary Reggae Got Soul: The Story of Toots and the Maytals which was aired on BBC. Described as "The untold story of one of the most influential artists ever to come out of Jamaica", it features appearances by Marcia Griffiths, Jimmy Cliff, Bonnie Raitt, Eric Clapton, Keith Richards, Willie Nelson, Anthony DeCurtis, Ziggy Marley, Chris Blackwell, Paolo Nutini, Paul Douglas, Sly Dunbar, and Robbie Shakespeare.

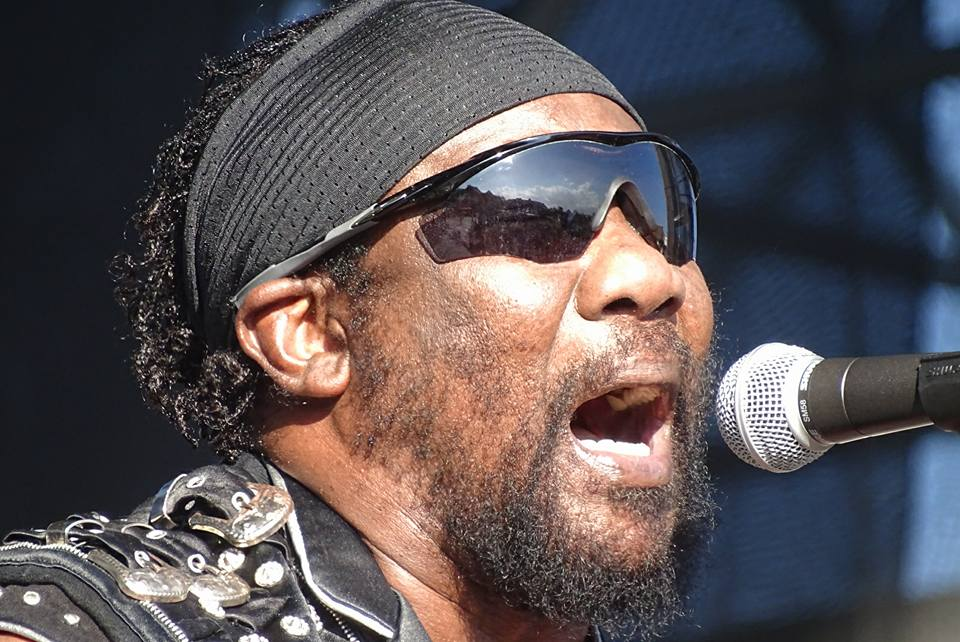
Hibbert at the One Big Holiday 2018, Punta Cana, Dominican Republic

In May 2013, Hibbert received a head injury after being hit by a thrown bottle during a performance at the River Rock Festival in Richmond, Virginia, U.S. forcing him to cancel several months of live shows. The bottle was thrown by William C Lewis. Lewis was facing a charge of malicious wounding, but he pleaded guilty to lesser charges. Despite Hibbert pleading in a letter to the judge, "He is a young man, and I have heard what happens to young men in jail. My own pain and suffering would be increased substantially knowing that this young man would face that prospect," the judge gave Lewis a six-month sentence.

After a three-year hiatus following the incident at the River Rock Festival, in 2016 Toots and the Maytals returned to the stage and began touring again. Hibbert's vocals appear in the Major Lazer and Bad Royale 2016 collaboration, "My Number", which samples his band's earlier song "54-46 That's My Number".

On 25 July 2018, Hibbert performed on the U.S. television show The Tonight Show Starring Jimmy Fallon with Toots and the Maytals where they debuted an original song titled "Marley" as well as performing their classic hit song "Funky Kingston" in a live performance.

Toots and the Maytals have been cited as inspiration for other music artists as per career longevity. Jamaican artist Sean Paul explained this in saying, "I've seen some great people in my industry, you know, people like Toots...Toots and the Maytals. Toots, he's a great reggae artist and he's still doing it...He's up there in years and he's doing it. Those kind of artists inspire me. I know I'm just going to keep on doing music as long as I can."

== Personal life ==
Hibbert married Doreen as a teenager. They had seven children. Two of his songs, "It's You" and "Never You Change" were written for Doreen when she was 18 years old. His son Clayton followed him into a career in music, performing and recording under the name 'Junior Toots'. His daughter, Jenieve, also followed him into music, most popularly performing as one half of a gospel duo with now ex-husband, Robert Bailey.

== Death ==
In August 2020, it was reported that Hibbert was in hospital "fighting for his life" in a medically induced coma. On 12 September 2020, a statement on the band's Facebook page announced that he had died, at the age of 77. The Gleaner and Rolling Stone later confirmed the announcement, reporting that Hibbert had died at the University Hospital of the West Indies in Kingston, in a medically induced coma. It was later confirmed that COVID-19 during the pandemic in Jamaica was the underlying cause of his death.

== Honors ==
In 2010, Hibbert ranked No. 71 in Rolling Stone magazine's "100 Greatest Singers of All Time". In August 2012, it was announced that he would receive the Order of Jamaica, the country's fifth highest honour.

== See also ==
- Peter Tosh
- Bunny Wailer
