= 1957 =

1957 in various calendars
- Gregorian calendar: 1957; MCMLVII
- Ab urbe condita: 2710
- Armenian calendar: 1406; ԹՎ ՌՆԶ
- Assyrian calendar: 6707
- Baháʼí calendar: 113–114
- Balinese saka calendar: 1878–1879
- Bengali calendar: 1363–1364
- Berber calendar: 2907
- British Regnal year: 5 Eliz. 2 – 6 Eliz. 2
- Buddhist calendar: 2501
- Burmese calendar: 1319
- Byzantine calendar: 7465–7466
- Chinese calendar: 丙申年 (Fire Monkey); 4654 or 4447 — to — 丁酉年 (Fire Rooster); 4655 or 4448
- Coptic calendar: 1673–1674
- Discordian calendar: 3123
- Ethiopian calendar: 1949–1950
- Hebrew calendar: 5717–5718
- Hindu calendars
- Vikram Samvat: 2013–2014
- Shaka Samvat: 1878–1879
- Kali Yuga: 5057–5058
- Holocene calendar: 11957
- Igbo calendar: 957–958
- Iranian calendar: 1335–1336
- Islamic calendar: 1376–1377
- Japanese calendar: Shōwa 32 (昭和３２年)
- Javanese calendar: 1888–1889
- Juche calendar: 46
- Julian calendar: Gregorian minus 13 days
- Korean calendar: 4290
- Minguo calendar: ROC 46 民國46年
- Nanakshahi calendar: 489
- Thai solar calendar: 2500
- Tibetan calendar: མེ་ཕོ་སྤྲེ་ལོ་ (male Fire-Monkey); 2083 or 1702 or 930 — to — མེ་མོ་བྱ་ལོ་ (female Fire-Bird); 2084 or 1703 or 931

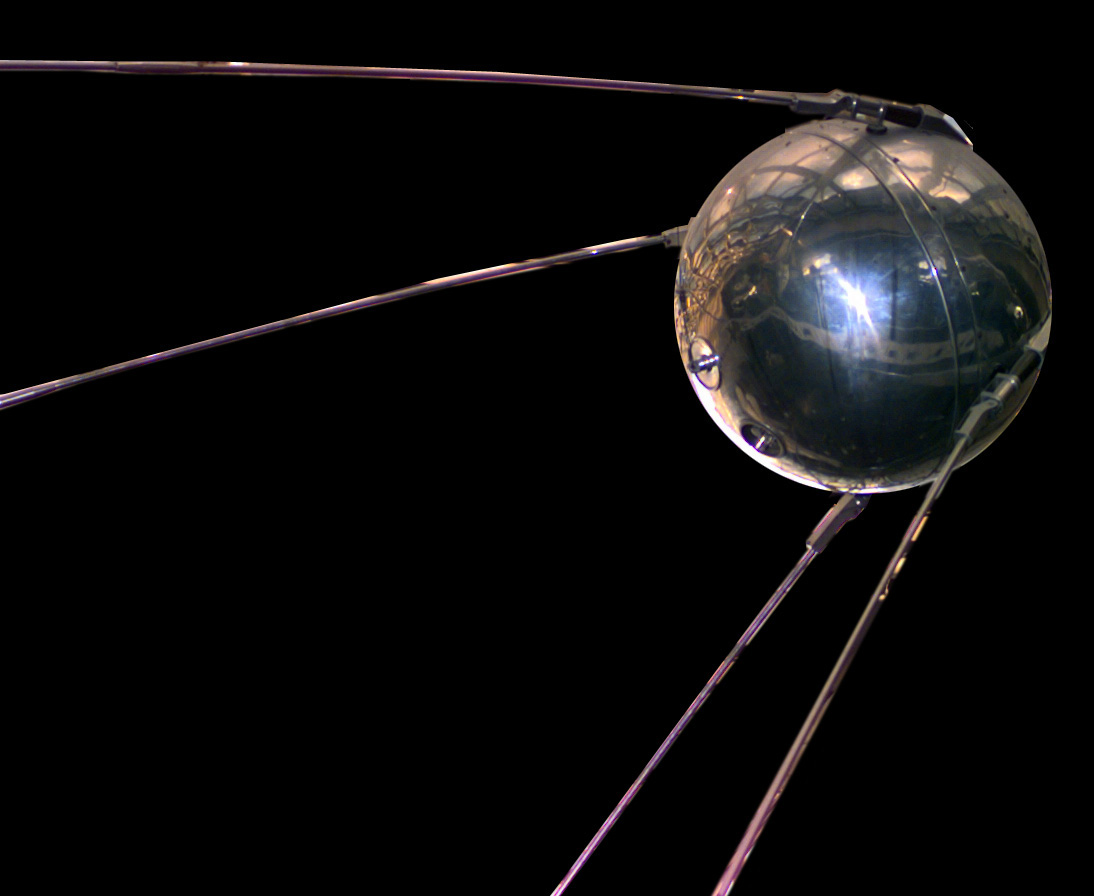
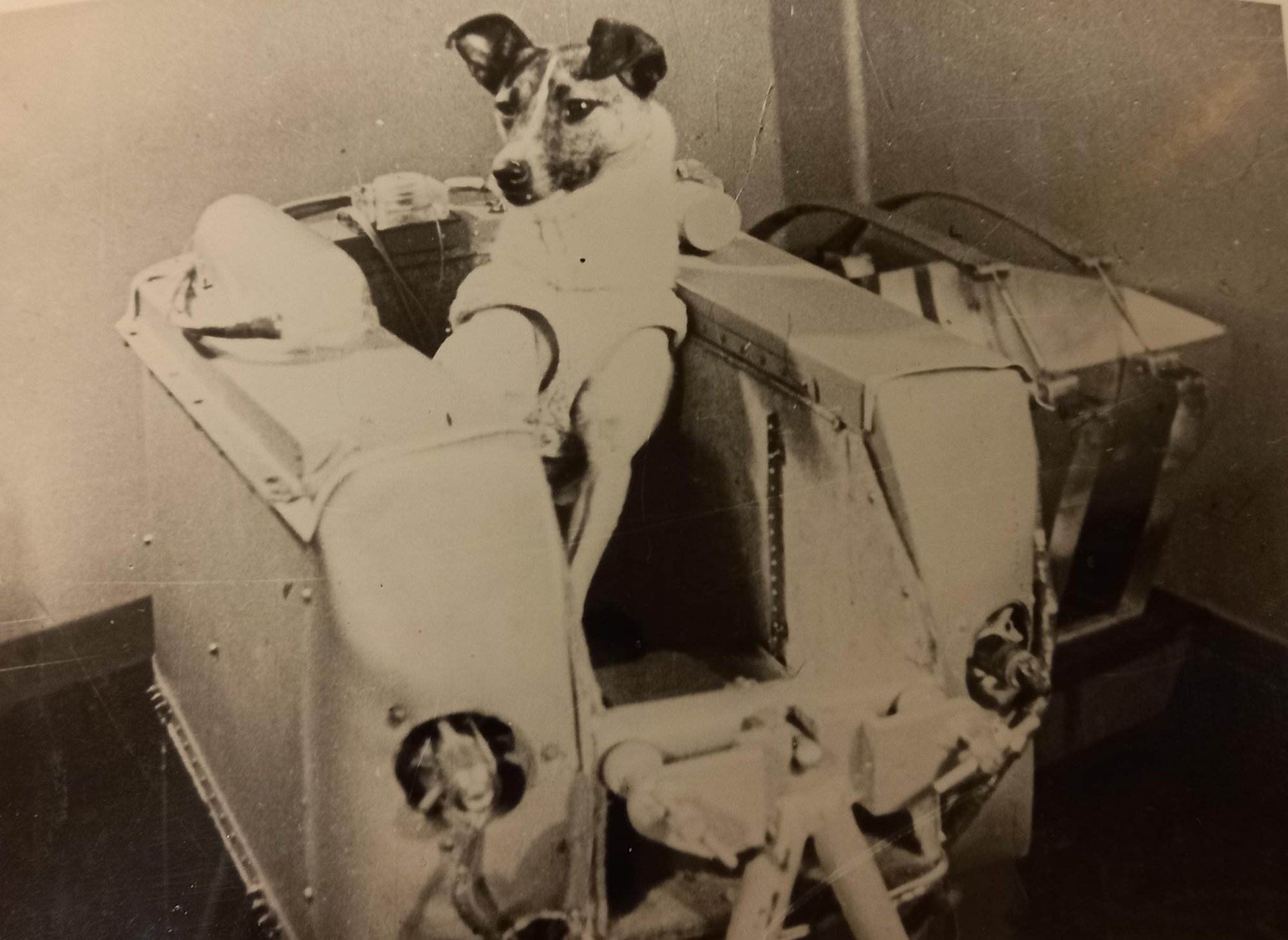
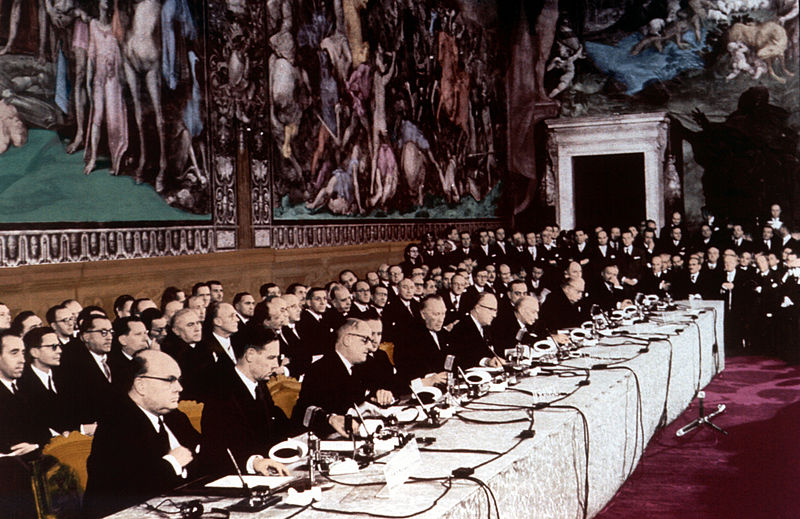
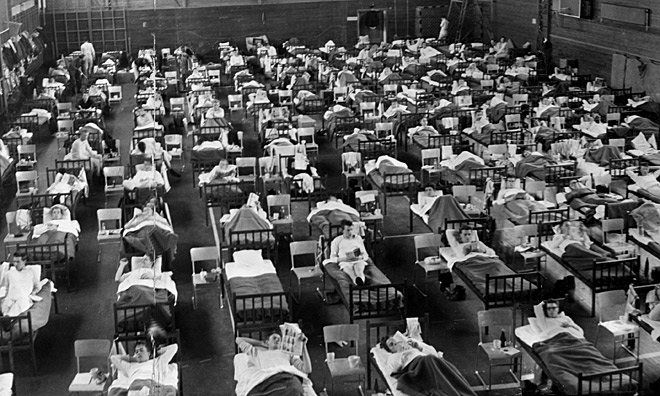
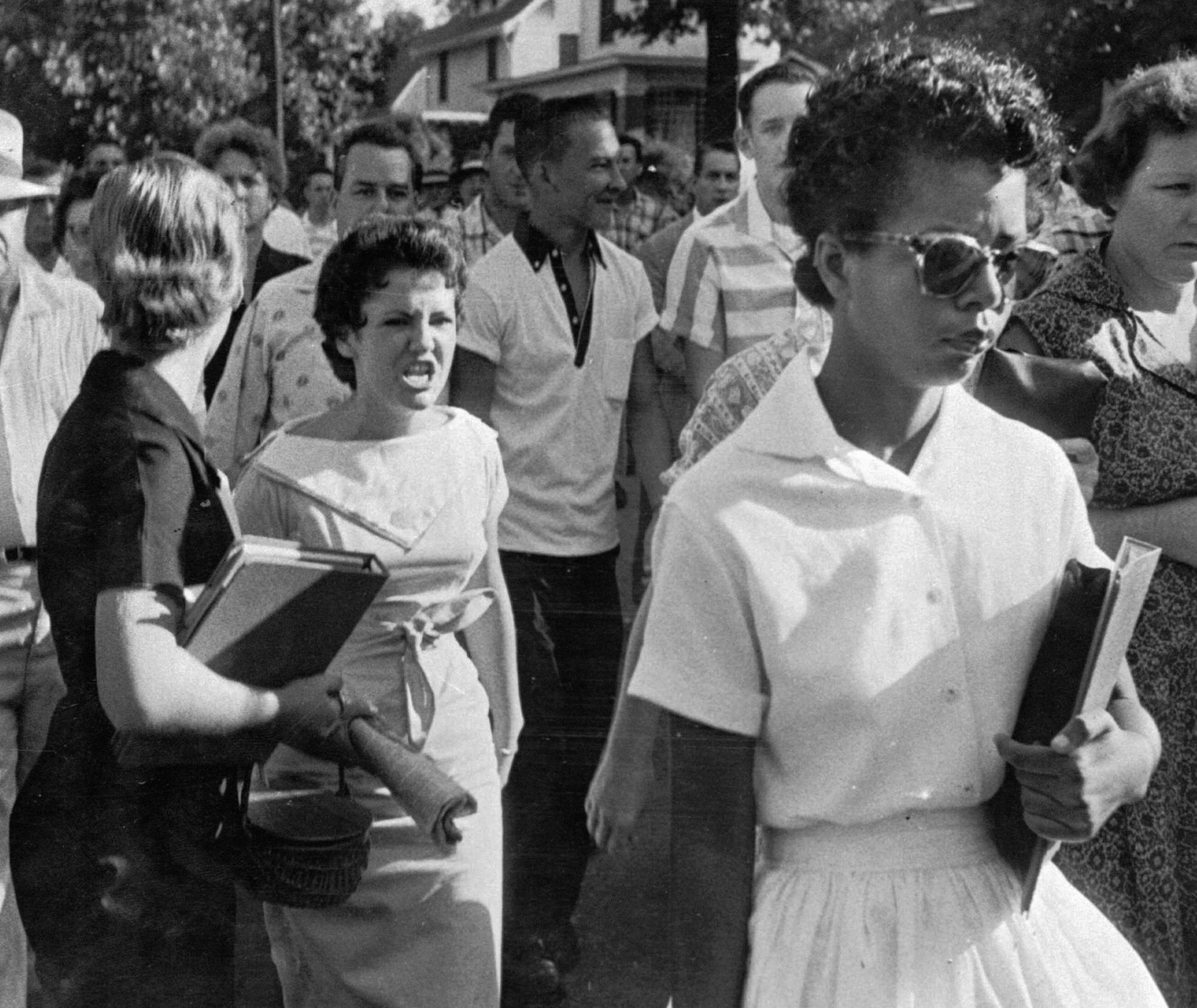
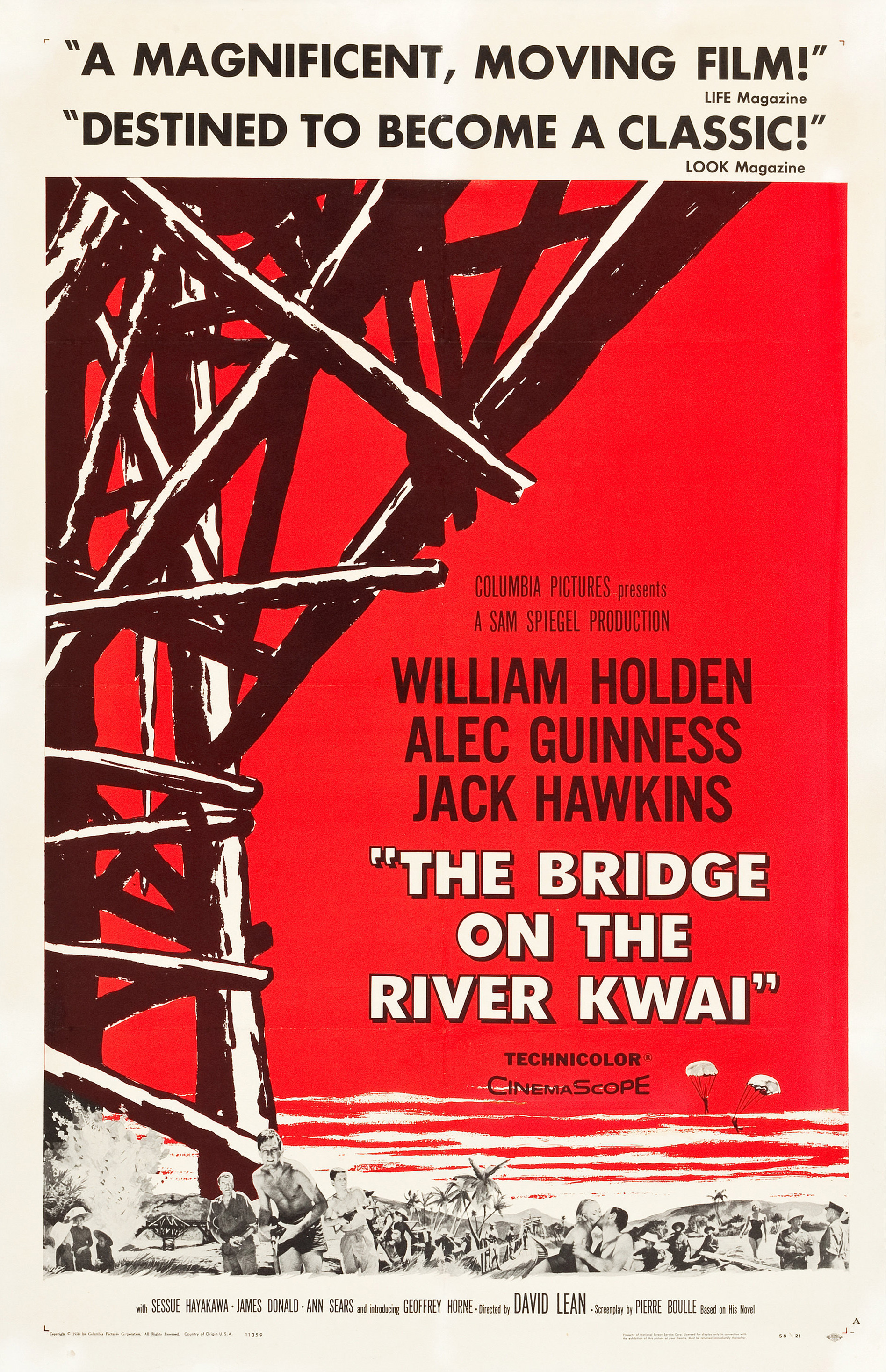
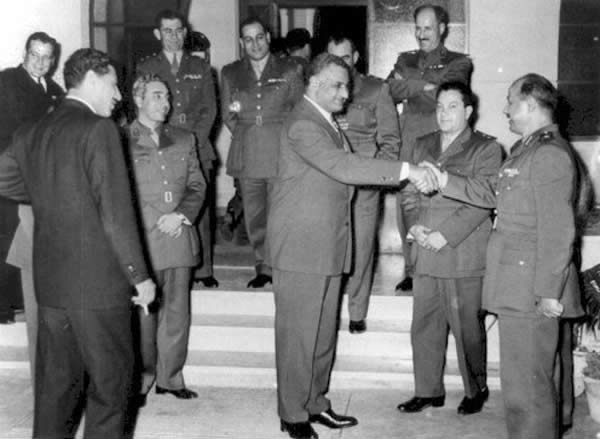
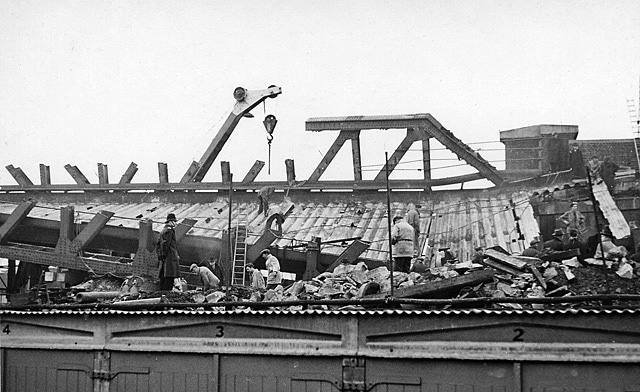
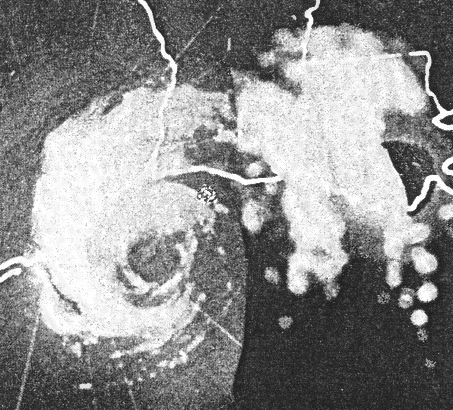
From top to bottom, left to right: the Sputnik launch begins the Space Race; Sputnik 2 sends Laika into orbit; the Treaty of Rome creates the European Economic Community; the 1957–1958 influenza pandemic kills over a million worldwide; the Little Rock Nine integrate Little Rock Central High School; The Bridge on the River Kwai premieres to major acclaim; the Syrian Crisis of 1957 heightens Middle East tensions; the Lewisham rail crash kills 90 in London; and Hurricane Audrey devastates the U.S. Gulf Coast.

1957 (MCMLVII) was a common year starting on Tuesday of the Gregorian calendar, the 1957th year of the Common Era (CE) and Anno Domini (AD) designations, the 957th year of the 2nd millennium, the 57th year of the 20th century, and the 8th year of the 1950s decade.

== Events ==
=== January ===
- January 1 – The Saarland joins West Germany.
- January 3 – Hamilton Watch Company introduces the first electric watch.
- January 5 – South African player Russell Endean becomes the first batsman to be dismissed for having handled the ball in Test cricket.
- January 9 – British Prime Minister Anthony Eden resigns on health grounds.
- January 10 – Harold Macmillan becomes Prime Minister of the United Kingdom.
- January 11 – The African Convention is founded in Dakar.
- January 14 – Kripalu Maharaj is named fifth Jagadguru (world teacher), after giving seven days of speeches before 500 Hindu scholars.
- January 20 – Israel withdraws from the Sinai Peninsula (captured from Egypt on October 29, 1956).
- January 26 – The Ibirapuera Planetarium (the first in the Southern Hemisphere) is inaugurated in the city of São Paulo, Brazil.

=== February ===
- February 2 – President Iskander Mirza of Pakistan lays the foundation-stone of the Guddu Barrage across the Indus River, near Sukkur.
- February 4
  - France prohibits U.N. involvement in Algeria.
  - The first nuclear-powered submarine, USS Nautilus, logs its 60,000th nautical mile, matching the endurance of the fictional Nautilus described in Jules Verne's 1870 novel Twenty Thousand Leagues Under the Seas. It is decommissioned on March 3, 1980.
  - A coal gas explosion at the giant Bishop Coal Mine in Bishop, Virginia, United States, kills 37 men.
- February 6 – The Soviet Union announces that Swedish envoy Raoul Wallenberg had died in a Soviet prison ("possibly of a heart attack"), on July 17, 1947
- February 10 – The Confederation of African Football is founded, at a meeting in Khartoum.
- February 15 – Andrei Gromyko becomes foreign minister of the Soviet Union.
- February 16 – Ingmar Bergman's film The Seventh Seal opens at cinemas in Sweden.
- February 17 – A fire at a home for the elderly in Warrenton, Missouri, United States, kills 72 people.
- February 18
  - Kenyan rebel leader Dedan Kimathi is executed by the British colonial government.
  - The last person to be executed in New Zealand, Walter James Bolton, is hanged at Mount Eden Prison for poisoning his wife.
- February 23 – The founding congress of the Senegalese Popular Bloc opens in Dakar.

=== March ===
Flag of Ghana, the first country in colonial Africa to gain independence

- March 1
  - U Nu becomes Prime Minister of Burma.
  - Arturo Lezama becomes President of the National Council of Government of Uruguay.
  - Sud Aviation forms, from a merger between SNCASE (Société Nationale de Constructions Aéronautiques du Sud Est) and SNCASO (Société Nationale de Constructions Aéronautiques du Sud Ouest).
- March 3 – Net als toen, sung by Corry Brokken (music by Guus Jansen, lyrics by Willy van Hemert), wins the Eurovision Song Contest 1957 (held at Frankfurt), for the Netherlands.
- March 6
  - United Kingdom colonies Gold Coast and British Togoland become the independent nation of Ghana.
  - Zodi Ikhia founds the Nigerien Democratic Front (FDN) in Niger.
- March 8 – Egypt re-opens the Suez Canal.
- March 14 – President Sukarno declares martial law in Indonesia.
- March 17 – 1957 Cebu Douglas C-47 crash: Philippine President Ramon Magsaysay and 24 others are killed in a plane crash.
- March 22 – A United States Air Force Boeing C-97 disappears somewhere over the Pacific Ocean near the coast of Japan. All 67 people and the aircraft remain missing to this day.
- March 25 – The Treaty of Rome (Patto di Roma) establishes the European Economic Community (EEC; predecessor of the European Union) between Italy, France, West Germany, Belgium, the Netherlands and Luxembourg.
- March 27 – The 29th Academy Awards Ceremony is held in Hollywood. Around the World in 80 Days wins Best Picture.

=== April ===
- April – IBM sells the first compiler for the Fortran scientific programming language.
- April 1 – The first new conscripts join the Bundeswehr.
- April 5 – The Communist Party of India wins the elections in Kerala, making E. M. S. Namboodiripad its first chief minister.
- April 9 – Egypt reopens the Suez Canal to all shipping.
- April 12 – The United Kingdom announces that Singapore will gain self-rule on January 1, 1958.
- April 13 – The 1957 alleged Jordanian military coup attempt against Hussein Bin Talal is made by Ali Abu Nuwar.
- April 15
  - The Distant Early Warning Line is handed over by contractors to the U.S. and Canadian military.
  - White Rock secedes from Surrey, British Columbia, following a referendum.
- April 17 – Suspected English serial killer Dr John Bodkin Adams is found not guilty of murder, at the Old Bailey.
- April 24–25 – The 1957 Fethiye earthquakes occur on the Mediterranean coast of Turkey.
- April 30 – The solar eclipse of April 30, 1957, a non-central annular solar eclipse that does not have a northern path limit, takes place. This is the last of 57 umbral solar eclipses of Solar Saros 118.

=== May ===
- May 2 – "Die Stem van Suid-Afrika", written by Cornelis Jacobus Langenhoven, becomes the South African national anthem, replacing "God Save the Queen", which is retained as a royal anthem.
- May 8 – South Vietnamese President Ngo Dinh Diem begins a state visit to the United States, his regime's main sponsor.
- May 15
  - Operation Grapple: At Malden Island in the Pacific, Britain tests its first hydrogen bomb, which fails to detonate properly.
  - Stanley Matthews plays his final international game, ending an English record international career of almost 23 years.
- May 16 – Paul-Henri Spaak becomes the new Secretary General of NATO.
- May 24 – May 24 incident: Anti-American riots erupt in Taipei, Taiwan.
- May 30 – Real Madrid beats Fiorentina 2–0 at Santiago Bernabéu Stadium, Madrid, to win the 1956–57 European Cup (football).

=== June ===
- June 1 – Launch of the first Ayanami-class destroyer warship by the JMSDF.
- June 9 – Broad Peak, on the China-Pakistan border, is first ascended.
- June 21 – John Diefenbaker becomes the 13th Prime Minister of Canada.
- June 27 – Hurricane Audrey demolishes Cameron, Louisiana, U.S., killing 400 people.

=== July ===
- July 1
  - The International Geophysical Year begins.
  - The University of Waterloo is founded in Waterloo, Ontario, Canada.
  - Hugh Everett III publishes the first scientifically founded many-worlds interpretation of quantum mechanics.
  - Production of the Citroën Traction Avant automobile, begun in 1934, ceases.
- July 6 – At the age of fifteen, Paul McCartney meets John Lennon and his band, the Quarrymen, at the St Peter's Church Hall fête in Woolton.
- July 11 – His Highness Prince Karim Aga Khan IV becomes the 49th Imam of the Shia Ismaili Muslims at age 20. His grandfather Sir Sultan Mohammed Shah Aga Khan III appoints Prince Karim in his will.
- July 14 – Rawya Ateya takes her seat in the National Assembly of Egypt, thereby becoming the first female parliamentarian in the Arab world.
- July 16 – United States Marine Major John Glenn flies an F8U supersonic jet from California to New York in 3 hours, 23 minutes and 8 seconds, setting a new transcontinental speed record.
- July 23 – Asghar Khan becomes the first native Commander-in-Chief of the Pakistan Air Force and the world's youngest Air Vice Marshal at 36 years old.
- July 25 – Tunisia becomes a republic, with Habib Bourguiba as its first president.
- July 28
  - The 6th World Festival of Youth and Students, a high point of the Khrushchev Thaw, opens in Moscow.
  - Heavy rains and mudslides at Isahaya, western Kyūshū, Japan, kill 992.
- July 29 – The International Atomic Energy Agency is established.

=== August ===
- August 4 – Juan Manuel Fangio, driving for Maserati, wins the Formula One German Grand Prix, clinching (with 4 wins this season) his record 5th world drivers championship, including his 4th consecutive championship (also a record); these 2 records endure for nearly half a century.
- August 31 – The Federation of Malaya gains independence from the United Kingdom, subsequently celebrated as Malaysia's National Day. Abdul Rahman of Negeri Sembilan, Yang di-Pertuan Besar of Negeri Sembilan, becomes the first Yang di-Pertuan Agong of Malaya. The country's new Constitution had come into force on August 27. The Alliance Party and its successor are the ruling coalition until 2018.

=== September ===
Federation of Malaya gains independence from the British Empire

- September 5 – Cuban Revolution: Fulgencio Batista’s forces bomb anti-government riots in Cienfuegos.
- September 9 – The Civil Rights Act of 1957 is enacted, establishing the United States Commission on Civil Rights.
- September 21
  - Olav V becomes King of Norway on the death of his father Haakon VII.
  - The sailing ship Pamir sinks off the Azores in a hurricane.
- September 26 – West Side Story, a new musical by Leonard Bernstein with lyrics by Stephen Sondheim, opens on Broadway in New York City.
- September 29 – The Kyshtym disaster occurs at the Mayak nuclear reprocessing plant in Russia.

=== October ===
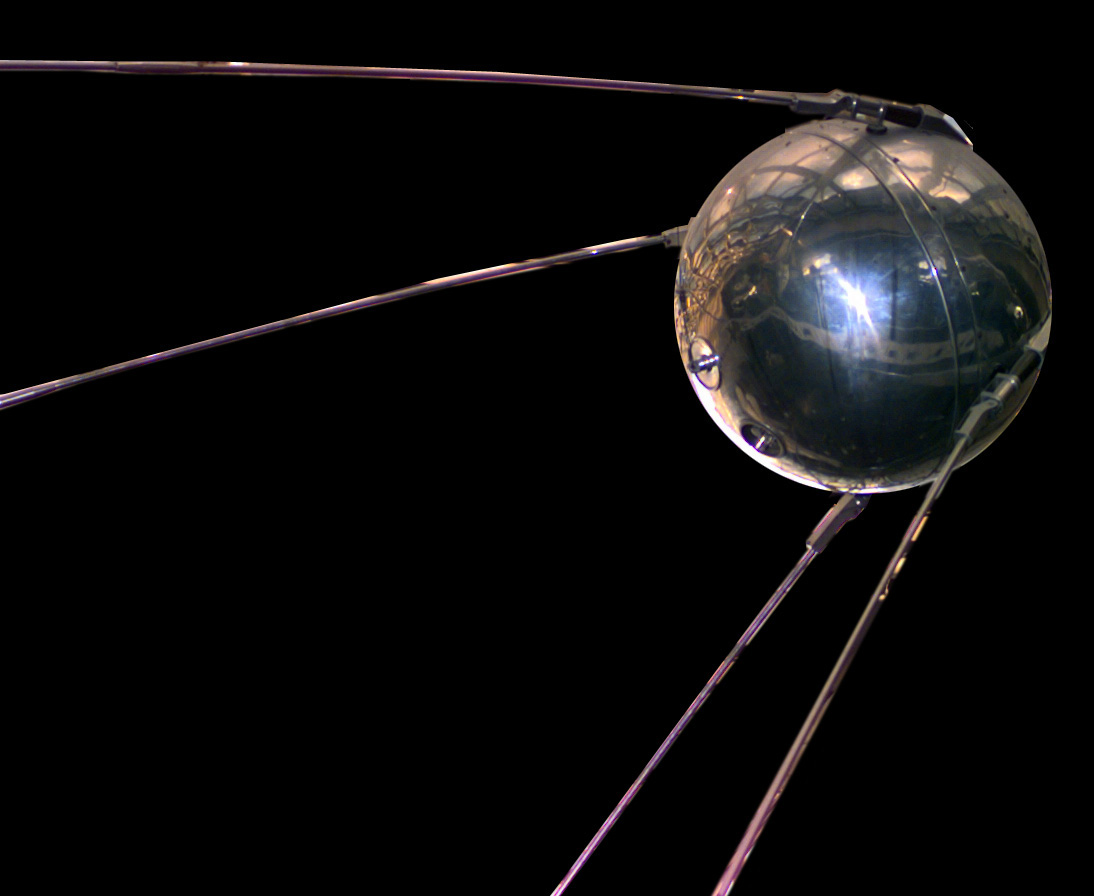
October 4: Sputnik program begins, the first satellite launched into space

- October 1 – The Africanized bee is accidentally released in Brazil.
- October 4
  - Space Age – Sputnik program: The Soviet Union launches Sputnik 1, the first artificial satellite to orbit the Earth.
  - The Avro Canada CF-105 Arrow delta wing interceptor aircraft is unveiled.
- October 9 – The Jodrell Bank radio telescope in Cheshire, England, is controlled from its control room for the first time.
- October 10 – Windscale fire: Fire at the Windscale nuclear reactor on the north-west coast of England releases radioactive material into the surrounding environment, including iodine-131.
- October 11 – The orbit of the last stage of the R-7 Semyorka rocket (carrying Sputnik I) is first successfully calculated on an IBM 704 computer at the MIT Computation Center as part of Operation Moonwatch, Cambridge, Massachusetts.
- October 20 – Two trains collide at Yarımburgaz in Turkey; 95 die.
- October 27 – Celâl Bayar is re-elected president of Turkey.

=== November ===
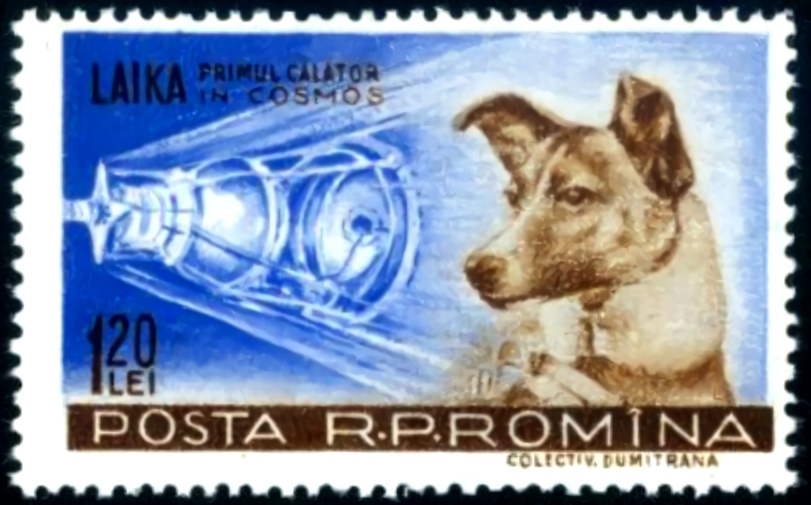
Laika the dog became the first animal to orbit Earth.

- November 1 – The Mackinac Bridge, the world's longest suspension bridge between anchorages at this time, opens in the United States, to connect Michigan's two peninsulas.
- November 3 – Sputnik program: The Soviet Union launches Sputnik 2, with the first animal to orbit the Earth, a dog named Laika, on board. There is no technology available to return her to Earth.
- November 13
  - Flooding in the Po Valley of Italy leads to flooding also in Venice.
  - Gordon Gould invents the laser.
- November 15
  - Yugoslavia announces the end of an economic boycott of Francoist Spain (although it does not reinstitute diplomatic relations).
  - 1957 Aquila Airways Solent crash: A flying boat crash on the Isle of Wight leaves 45 dead.
- November 16 – Adnan Menderes of the Democrat Party forms the new government of Turkey (23rd government, last government formed by DP and Menderes).
- November 30
  - Indonesian president Sukarno survives a grenade attack at the Cikini School in Jakarta, but several children are killed.
  - 1957 New Zealand general election: The Labour Party defeats the governing National Party, with Walter Nash succeeding Keith Holyoake as Prime Minister.

=== December ===
- December 1 – In Indonesia, Sukarno announces the nationalization of 246 Dutch businesses.
- December 4
  - The Lewisham rail crash in London, UK, leaves 92 people dead.
  - 1957 Bayankhongor Earthquake in Mongolia kills 30+ people
- December 5 – All 326,000 Dutch nationals are expelled from Indonesia.
- December 6 – The first U.S. attempt to launch a satellite fails, when the Vanguard rocket blows up on the launch pad.
- December 10 – Canadian diplomat Lester B. Pearson receives the Nobel Peace Prize, for his peacekeeping efforts in the United Nations.
- December 18 – A violent F5 tornado wipes out the entire community of Sunfield, Illinois.
- December 20 – The Boeing 707 airliner flies for the first time.

=== Date unknown ===
- Mao Zedong admits that 800,000 "class enemies" had been summarily liquidated in China between 1949 and 1954.
- Gruppe SPUR, an artistic collaboration, is founded in Germany.
- Raja Fashions, a tailoring business, is founded in Hong Kong.
- The so-called 'mound of Midas', the Great Tumulus near Gordium, is excavated.
- Three new neo-grotesque sans-serif typefaces are released: Folio (designed by Konrad Bauer and Walter Baum), Neue Haas Grotesk (designed by Max Miedinger) and Univers (designed by Adrian Frutiger); all will be influential in the International Typographic Style of graphic design.
- Albeit the practice was in decline since the late 19th Century, and illegal since 1912, the very last new case of Chinese foot binding was reported this year.

== Births ==
=== January ===
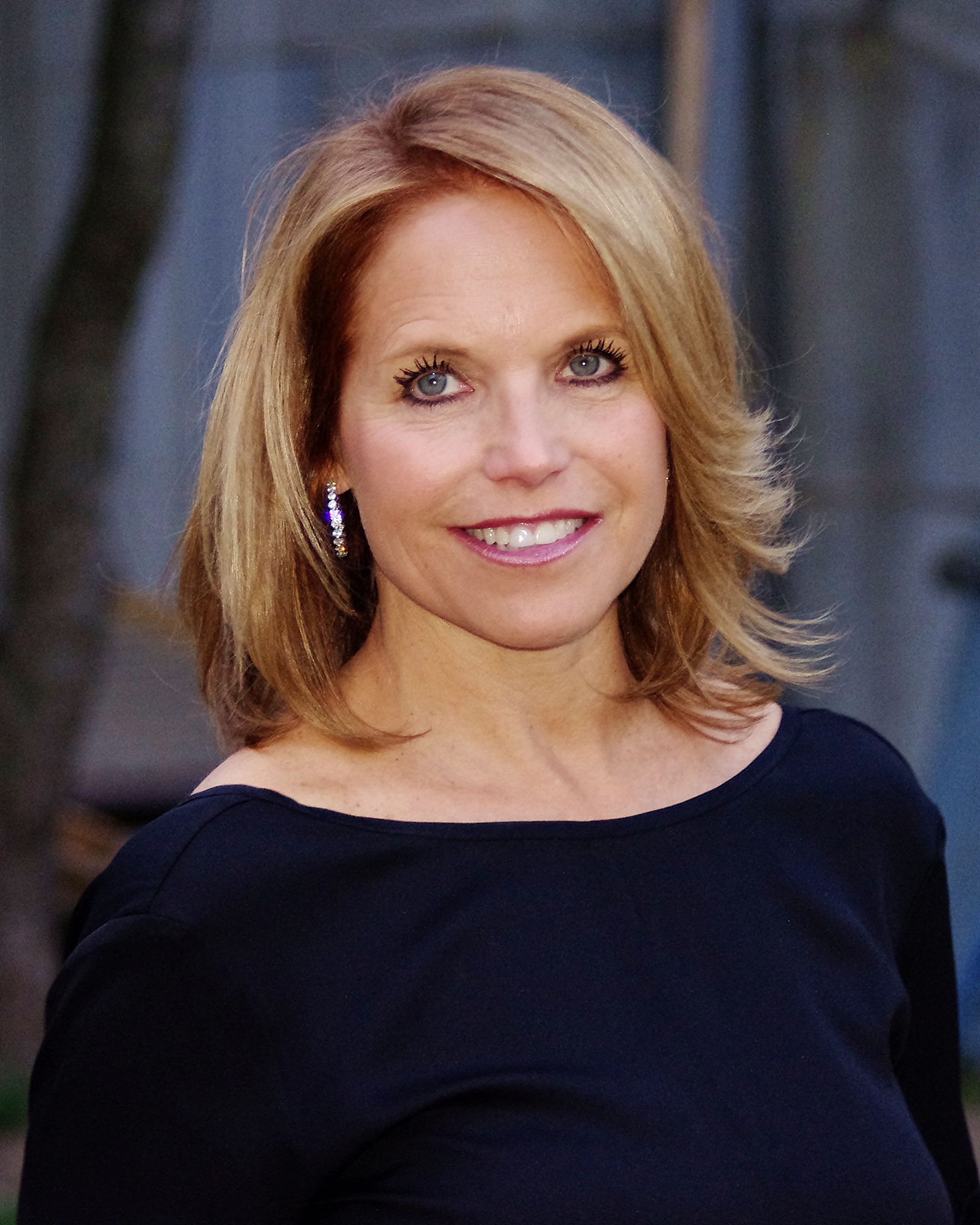
Katie Couric

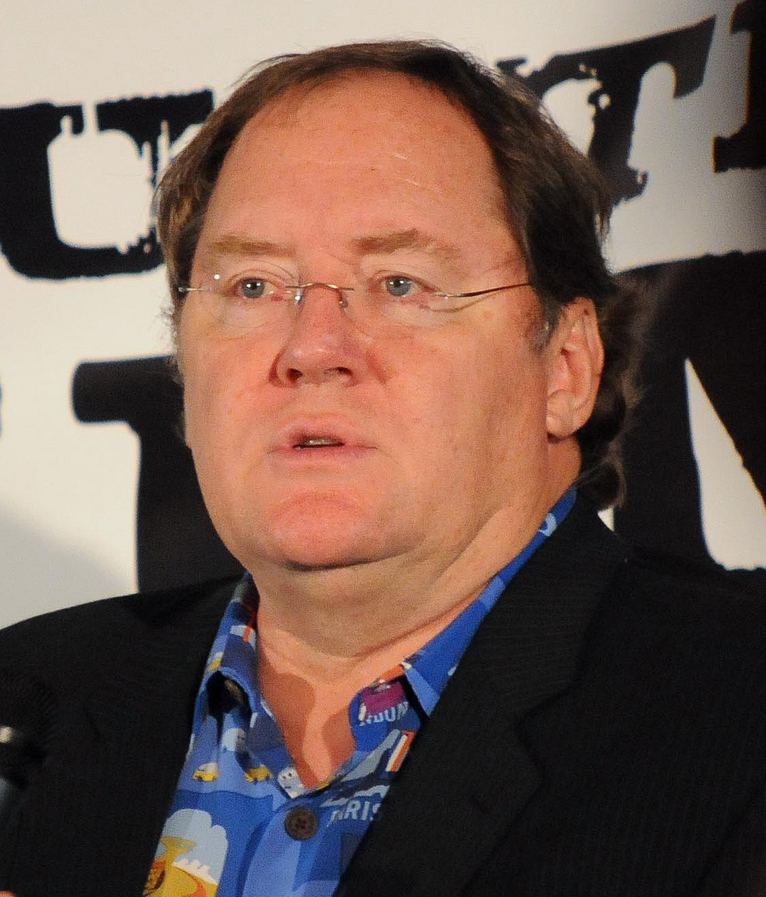
John Lasseter

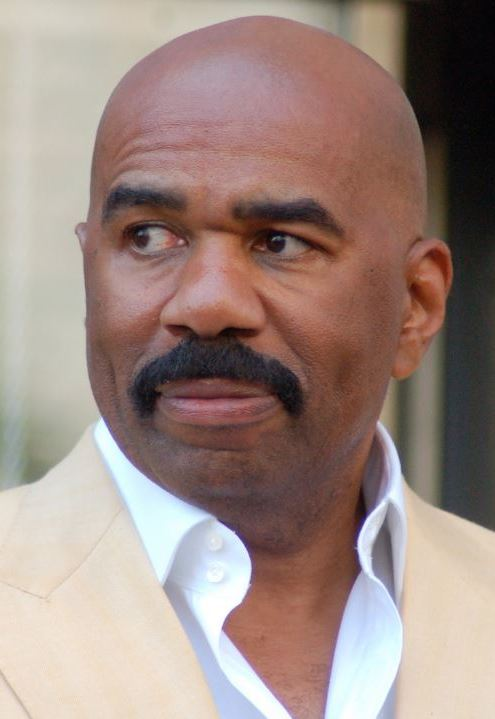
Steve Harvey

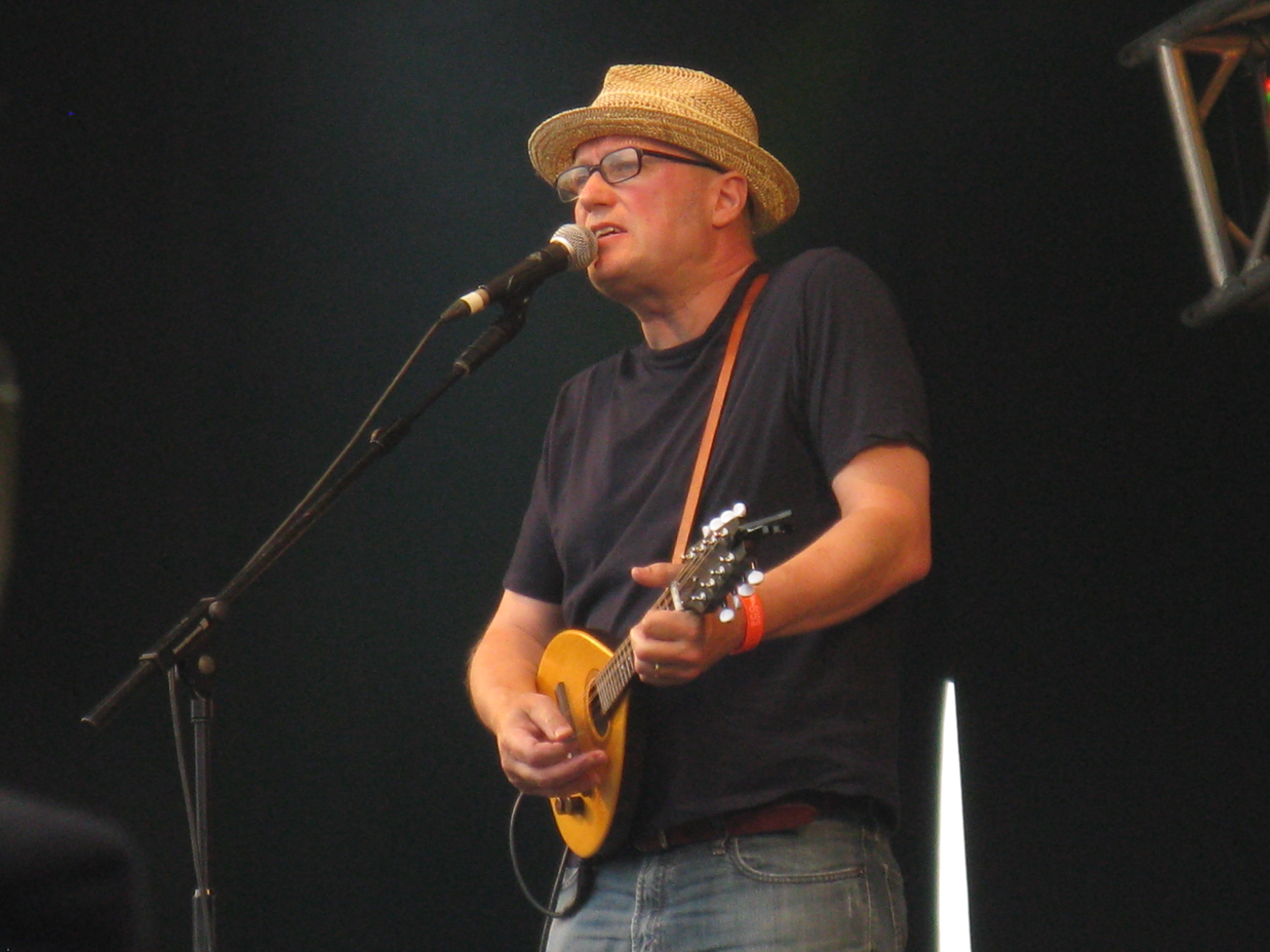
Ade Edmondson

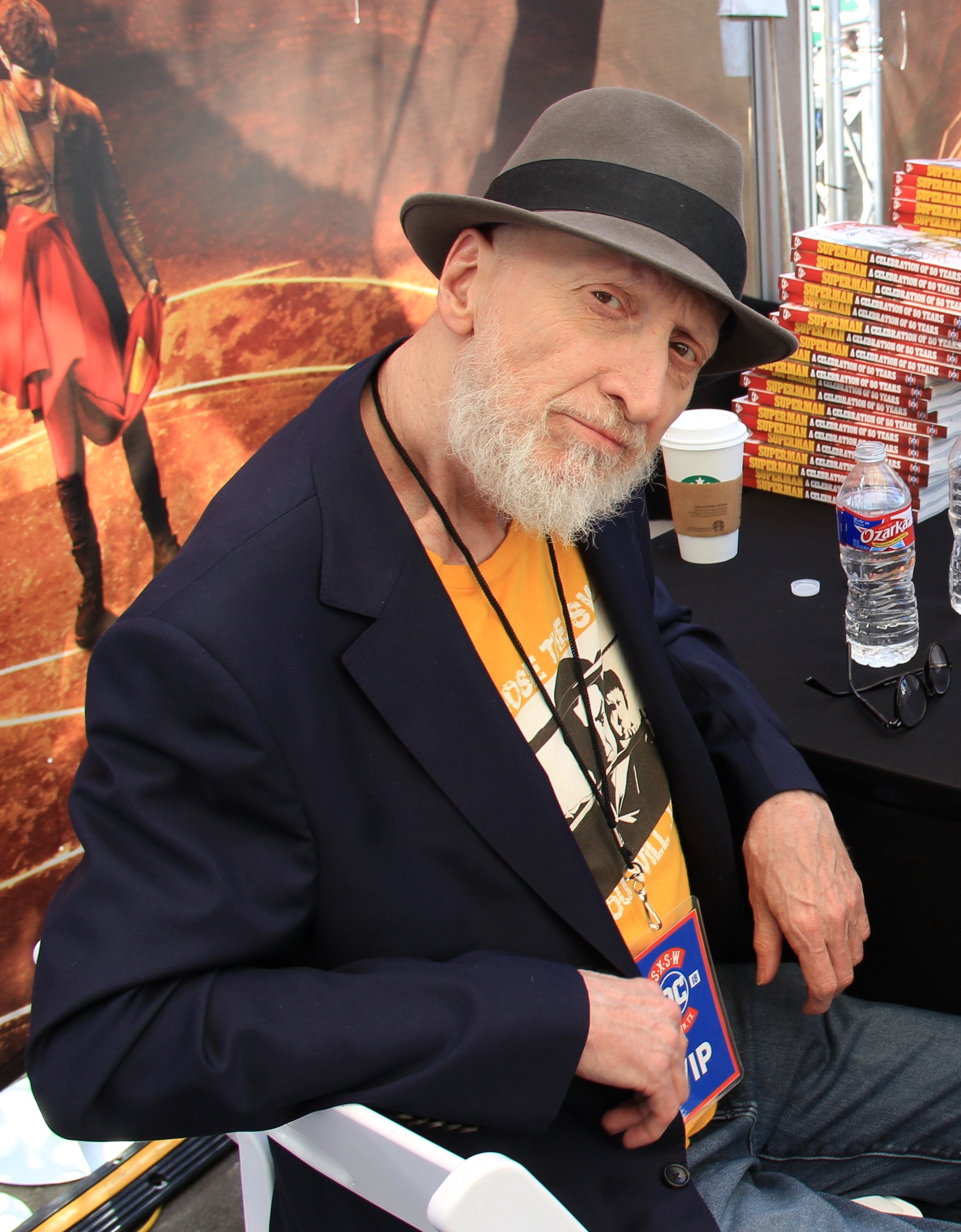
Frank Miller

- January 3 – Bojan Križaj, Slovenian alpine skier
- January 4 – Patty Loveless, American country music singer
- January 6 – Nancy Lopez, American golfer
- January 7
  - Katie Couric, American television host
  - Hannu Kamppuri, Finnish ice hockey goaltender
  - Julian Solís, Puerto Rican former world bantamweight champion boxer
- January 8 – David Lang, American composer
- January 9 – Bibie, Ghanaian singer
- January 11
  - Bryan Robson, English footballer
  - Claude Criquielion, Belgian bike racer (d. 2015)
- January 12 – John Lasseter, American director, writer and animator
- January 13
  - Lorrie Moore, American writer
  - Daniel Scioli, Argentine politician and sportsman
- January 14 – Anchee Min, Chinese writer
- January 15 – Mario Van Peebles, Mexican-born African-American actor and director
- January 16 – Ricardo Darín, Argentinian actor
- January 17 – Steve Harvey, African-American comedian, television host, radio personality and actor
- January 19 – Kenneth McClintock, former Secretary of State of Puerto Rico
- January 22
  - Mike Bossy, Canadian hockey player (d. 2022)
  - Godfrey Thoma, Nauruan politician
- January 23 – Princess Caroline of Monaco, Princess of Hanover
- January 26 – Road Warrior Hawk, American professional wrestler (d. 2003)
- January 27
  - Frank Miller, American comic book writer
  - Janick Gers, British heavy metal guitarist
- January 29 – Grażyna Miller, Polish poet
- January 30 – Payne Stewart, American golfer (d. 1999)

=== February ===
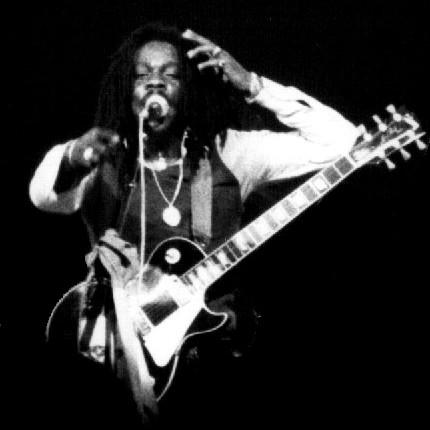
Dennis Brown

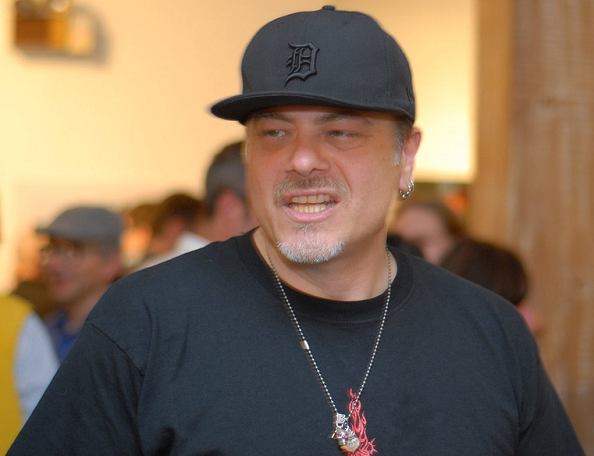
Danny Antonucci

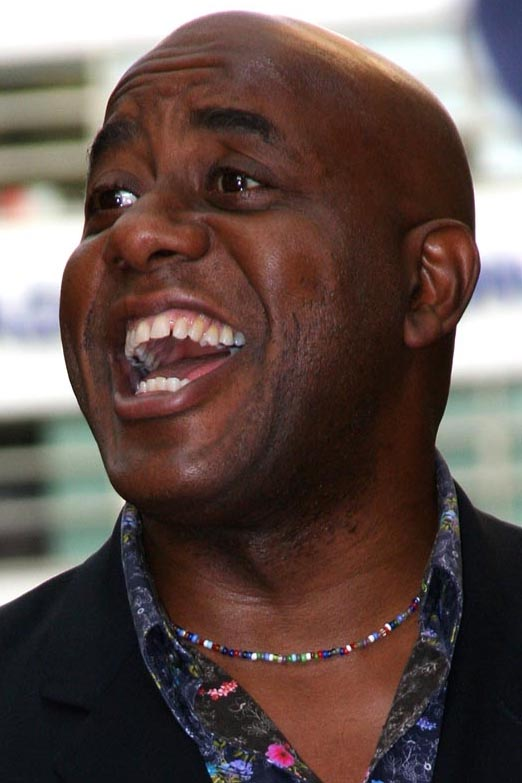
Ainsley Harriott

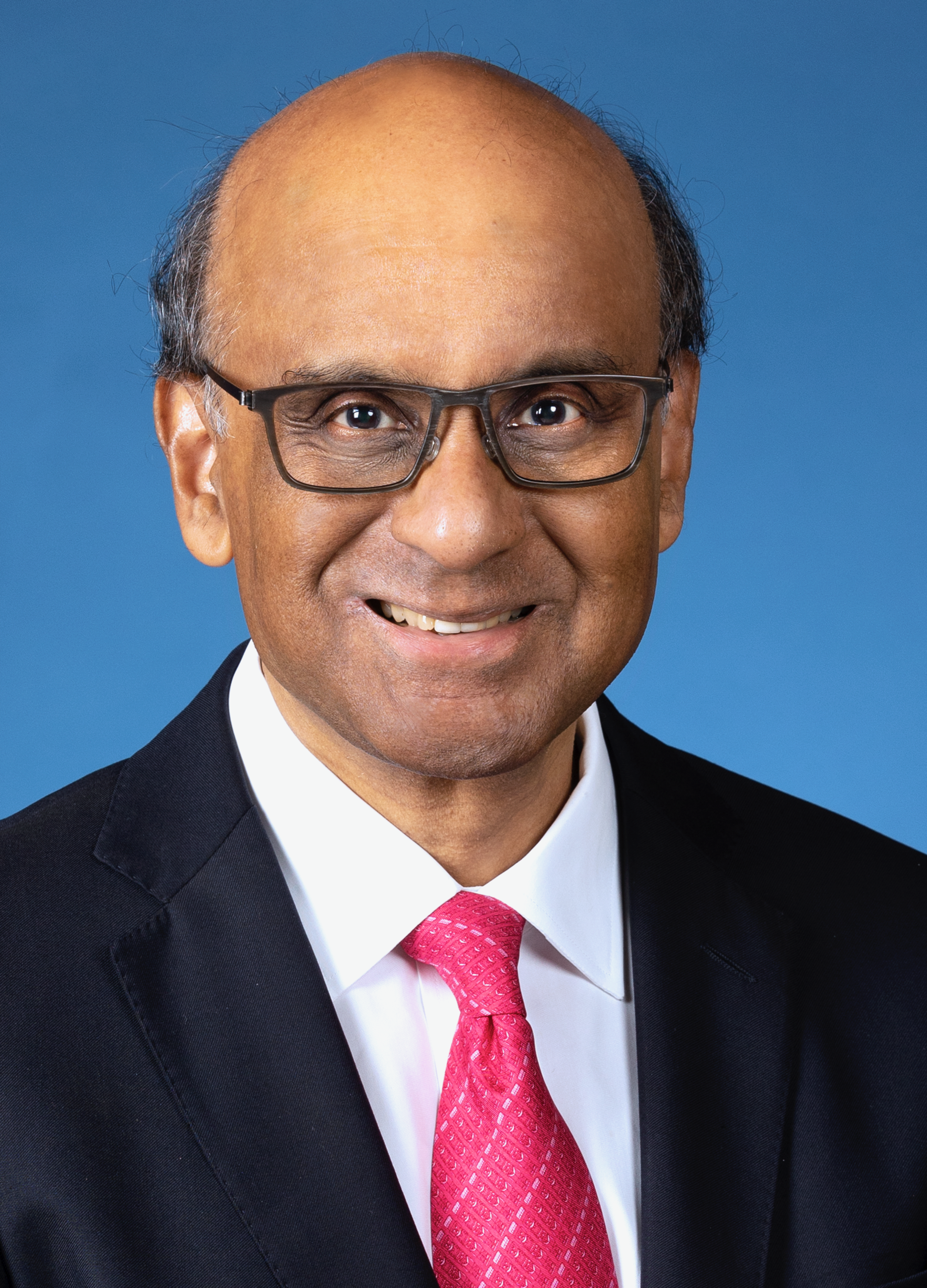
Tharman Shanmugaratnam

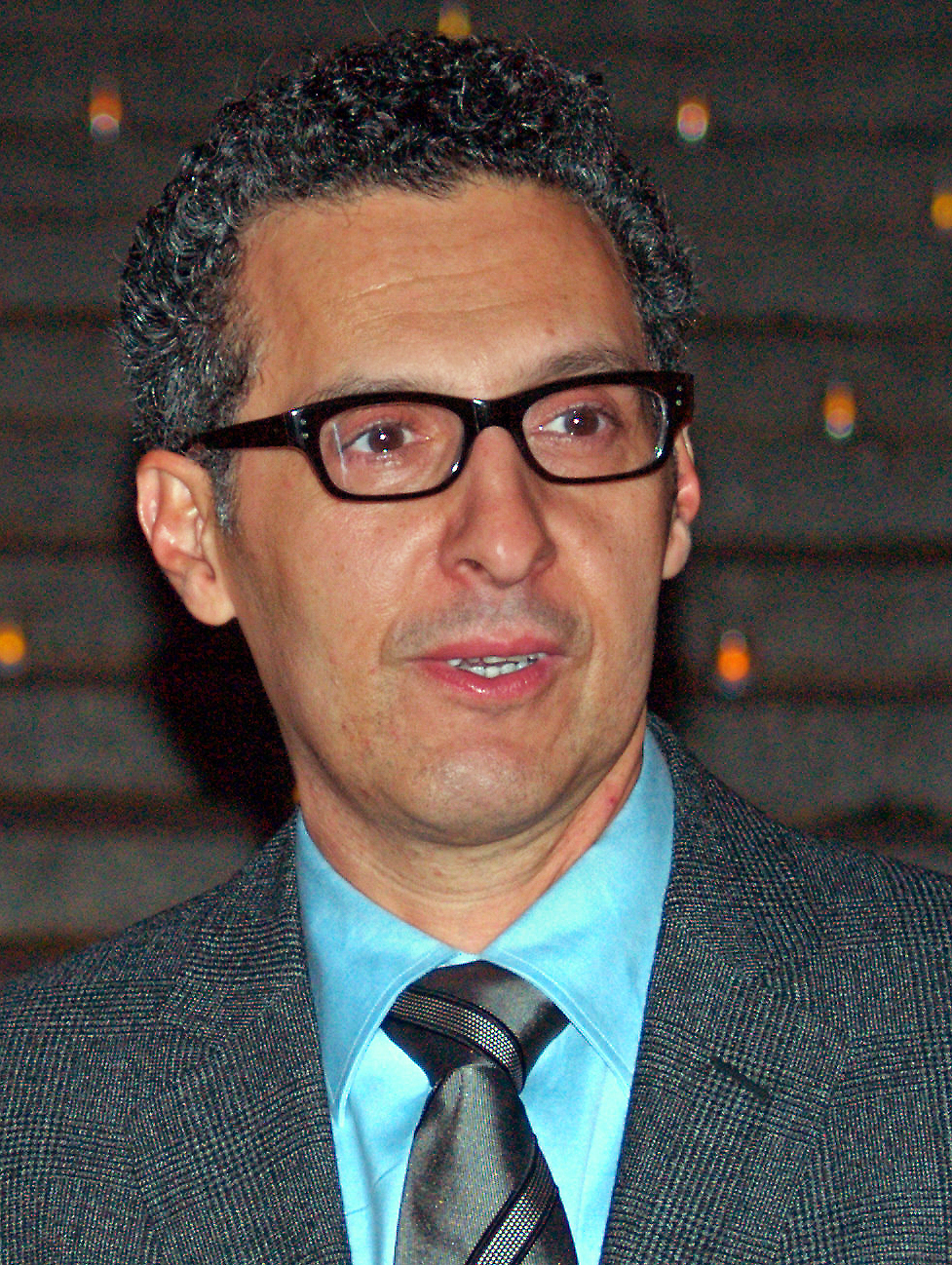
John Turturro

- February 1 – Dennis Brown, Jamaican reggae singer (d. 1999)
- February 2 – Phil Barney, French singer
- February 5 – Jackie Woodburne, Australian actress
- February 6
  - Kathy Najimy, American actress and comedian
  - Robert Townsend, African-American actor, comedian, director, and writer
- February 8 – Cindy Wilson, American rock singer (The B-52's)
- February 9 – Gordon Strachan, Scottish footballer and manager
- February 14 – Soile Isokoski, Finnish lyric soprano
- February 16 – LeVar Burton, African-American actor
- February 17 – Loreena McKennitt, Canadian singer, composer, harpist (Mummers' Dance)
- February 18
  - Marita Koch, German athlete
  - Vanna White, American game show presenter (Wheel of Fortune)
- February 19
  - Falco, Austrian rock musician (d. 1998)
  - Ray Winstone, British actor
- February 20 – Glen Hanlon, Canadian ice hockey coach
- February 23 – Ria Brieffies, Dutch singer (d. 2009)
- February 25 – Tharman Shanmugaratnam, Singaporean politician, 9th President of Singapore
- February 27
  - Danny Antonucci, Canadian creator of the Cartoon Network show Ed, Edd n Eddy
  - Timothy Spall, English actor
- February 28
  - Ian Smith, New Zealand cricketer
  - John Turturro, American actor, writer and director

=== March ===
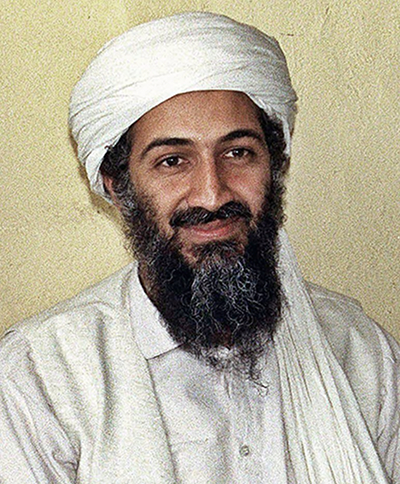
Osama bin Laden

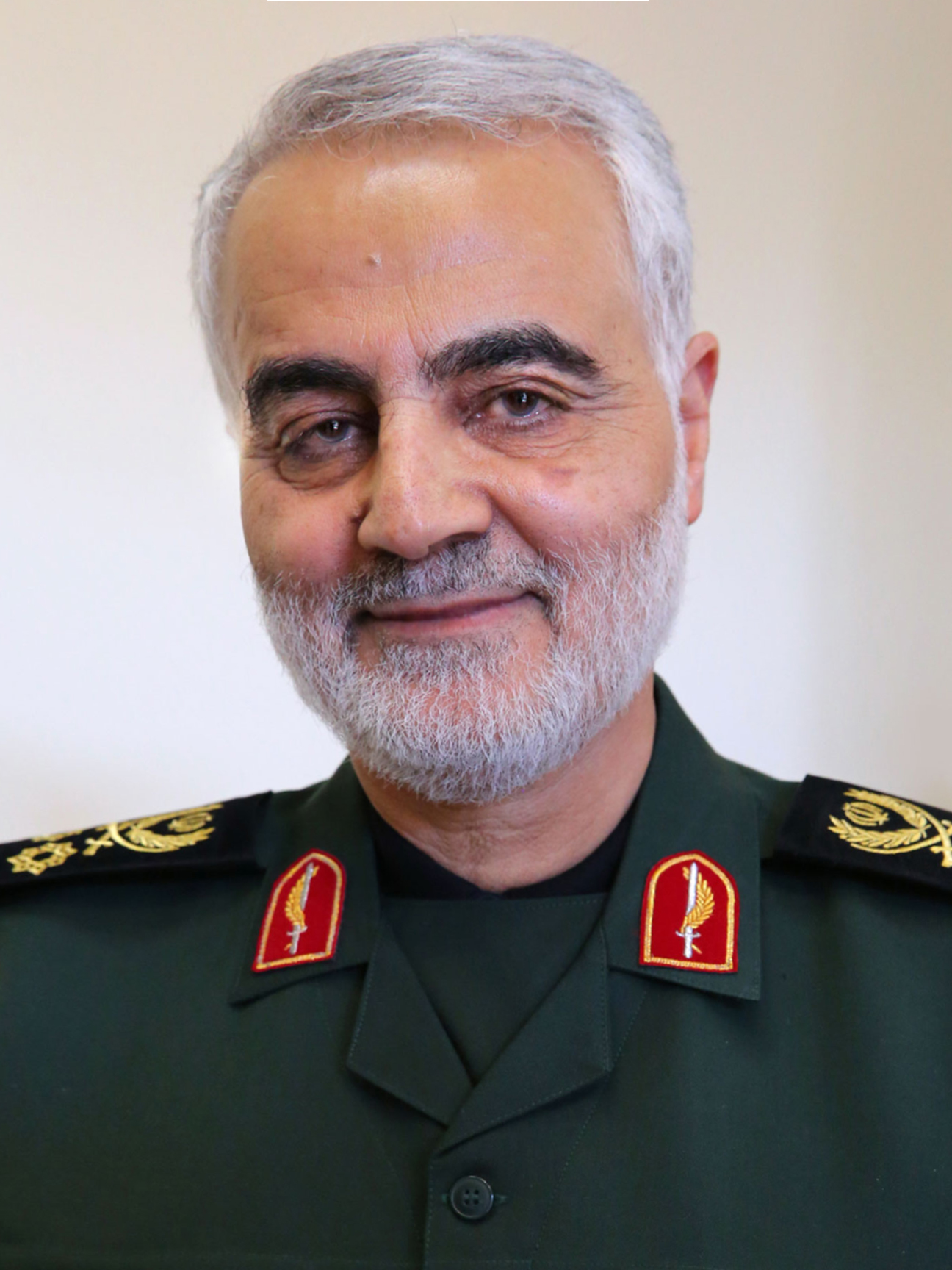
Qasem Soleimani

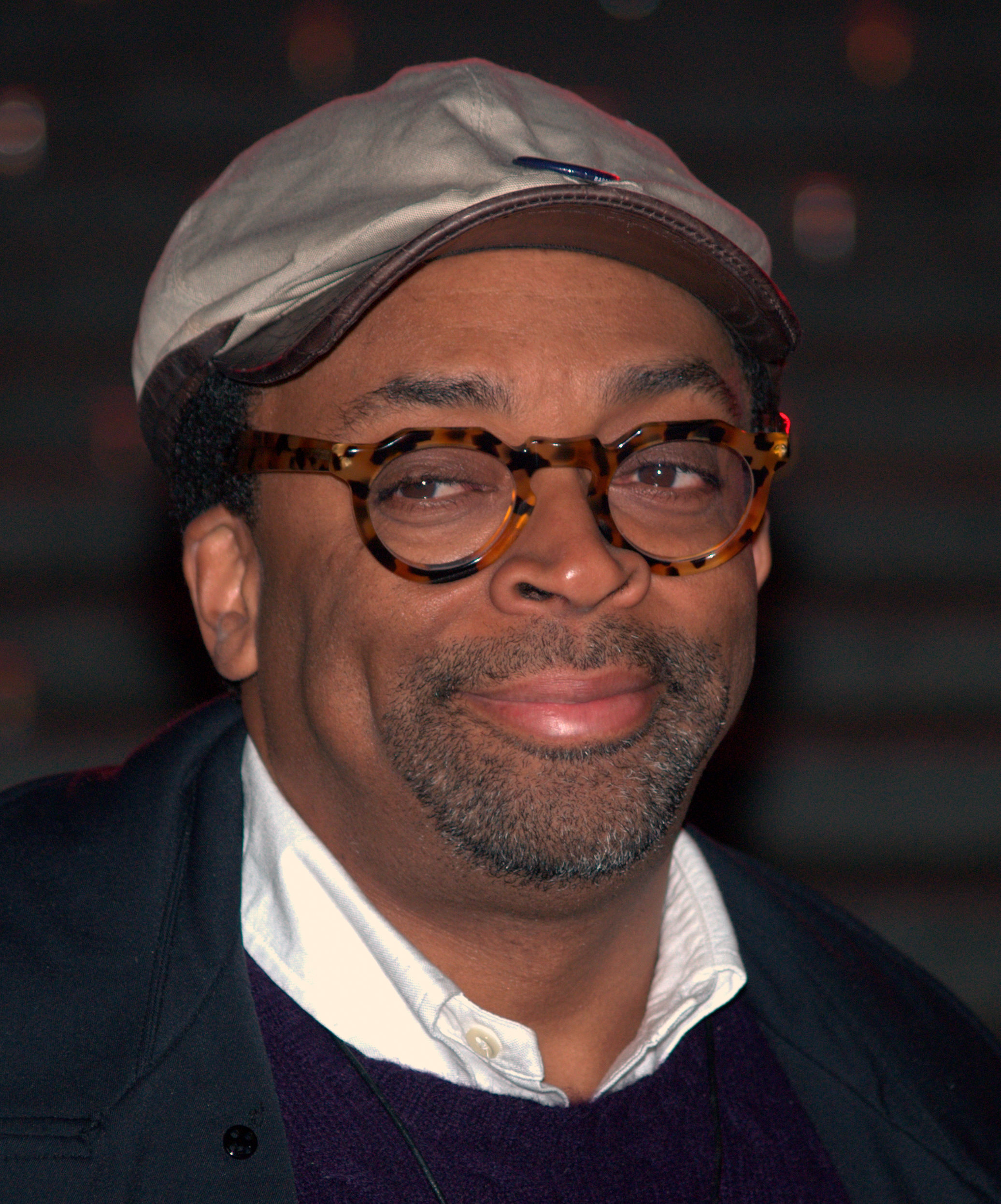
Spike Lee

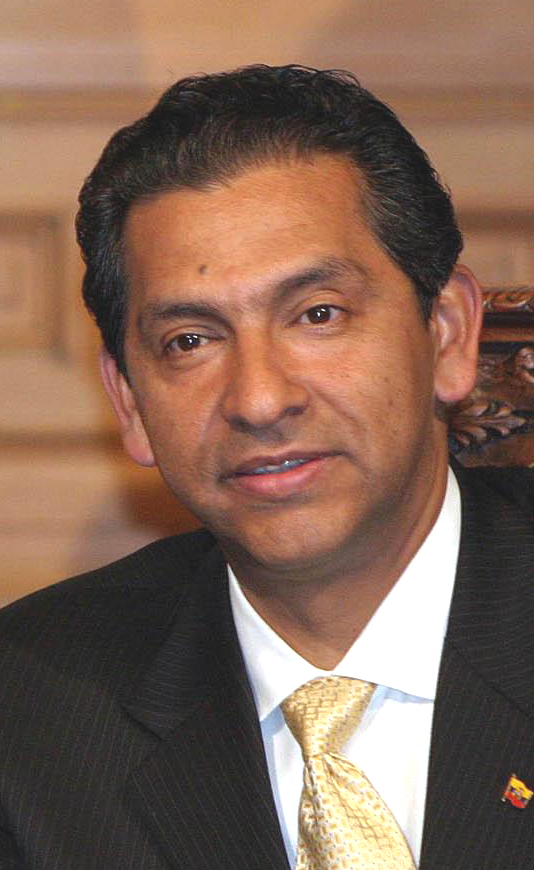
Lucio Gutiérrez

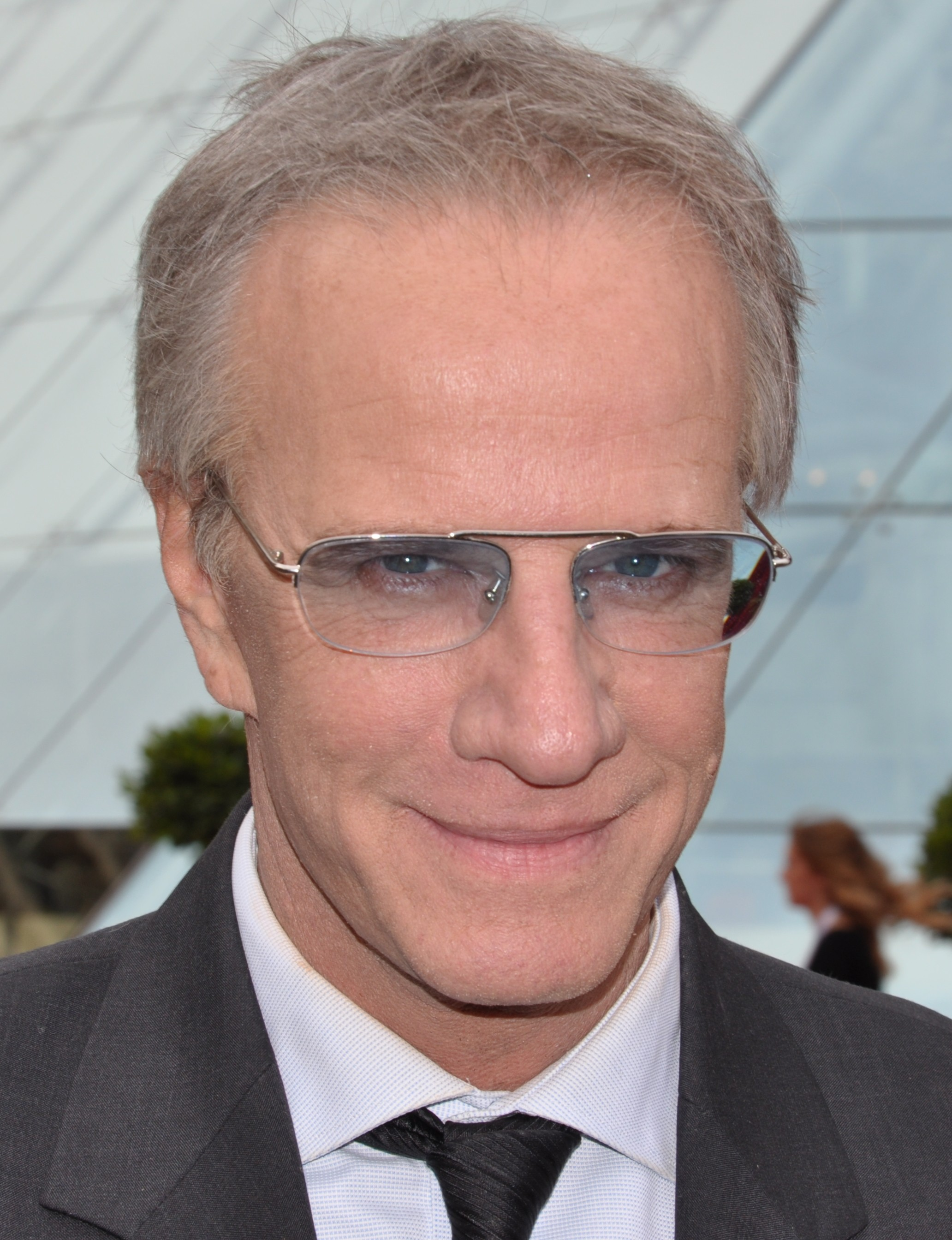
Christopher Lambert

- March 4 – Mykelti Williamson, American actor
- March 5 – Mark E. Smith, English singer (d. 2018)
- March 6 – Eddie Deezen, American actor and comedian
- March 8 – Clive Burr, British heavy metal drummer (d. 2013)
- March 9
  - Isabelle Olivieri, French agricultural engineer and biologist (d. 2016)
  - Mona Sahlin, Swedish politician
- March 10
  - Osama bin Laden, Saudi-born terrorist and founder of al-Qaeda (d. 2011)
  - Hans-Peter Friedrich, German politician
- March 11 – Qasem Soleimani, Iranian general (d. 2020)
- March 12
  - Val Demings, American politician
  - Marlon Jackson, African-American singer
- March 15
  - Joaquim de Almeida, Portuguese actor
  - Park Overall, American film and television actress
  - Steve Witkoff, American real estate investor, former lawyer, and diplomat
- March 18 – György Pazdera, Hungarian rock bassist (Pokolgép)
- March 19 – Christopher Murray, American actor
- March 20
  - Vanessa Bell Calloway, African-American actress
  - Spike Lee, African-American film director and actor
  - Theresa Russell, American actress
  - Chris Wedge, American filmmaker, animator, and voice actor
- March 22 – Michael Mosley, British television and radio journalist, producer, presenter and writer (d. 2024)
- March 23
  - Edna Molewa, South African politician (d. 2018)
  - Lucio Gutiérrez, 41st President of Ecuador
  - Robbie James, Welsh footballer
  - Amanda Plummer, American actress
- March 27 – Stephen Dillane, English actor
- March 28 – Paul Eiding, American actor and voice actor
- March 29 – Christopher Lambert, French-American actor
- March 30
  - Shen Yi-ming, Taiwanese Air Force general officer (d. 2020)
  - Ian Shelton, Canadian astronomer who discovered SN 1987A
- March 31 – Marc McClure, American actor

=== April ===
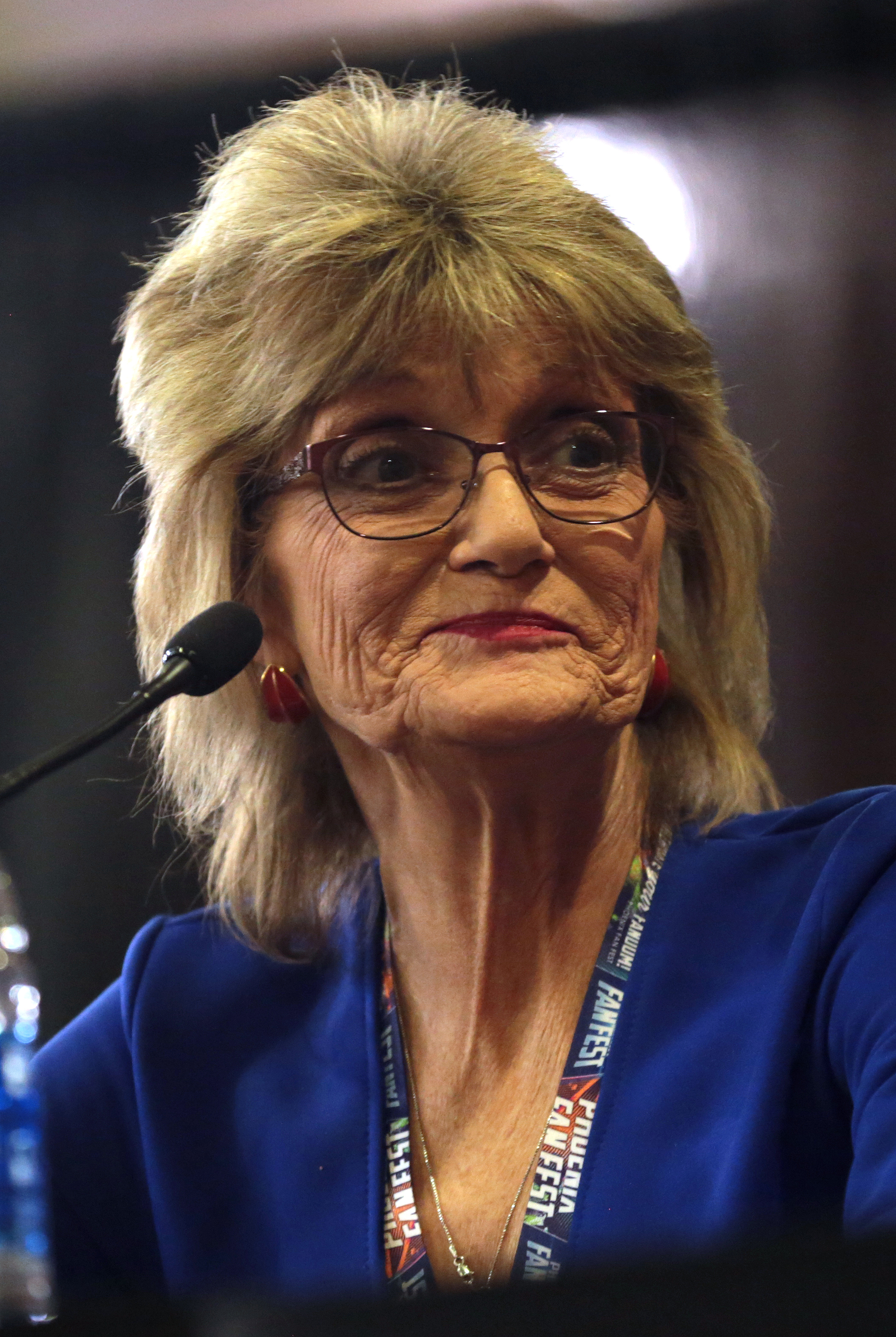
Denise Nickerson

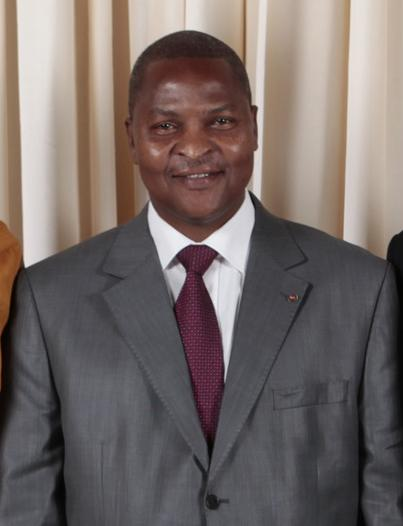
Faustin-Archange Touadéra

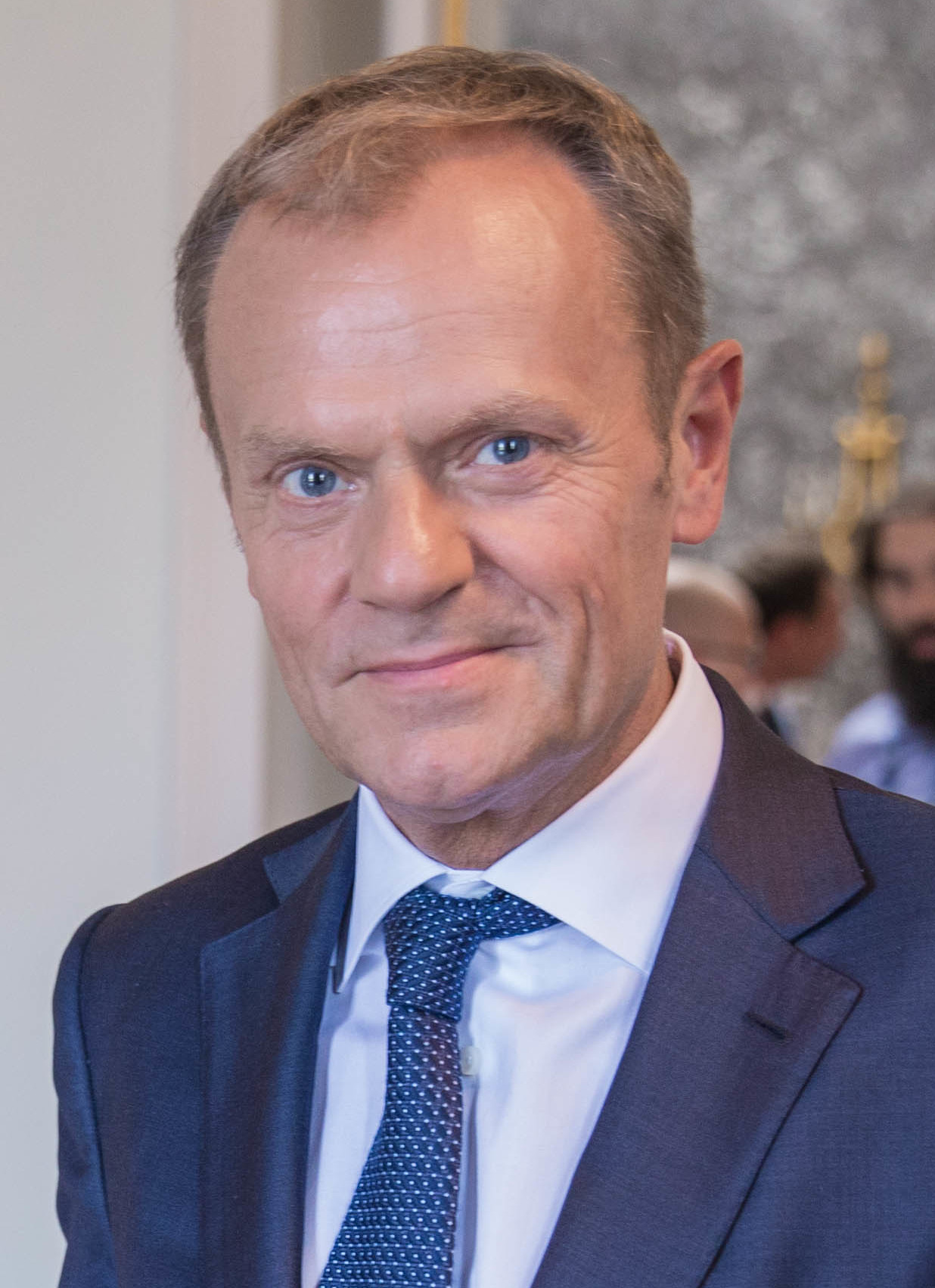
Donald Tusk

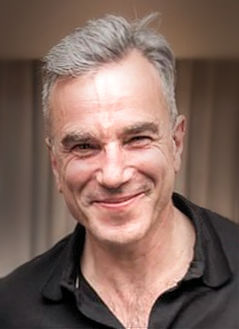
Daniel Day-Lewis

- April 1
  - J. Karjalainen, Finnish rock musician
  - Denise Nickerson, American actress and receptionist (d. 2019)
- April 2 – Giuliana De Sio, Italian actress
- April 4 – Aki Kaurismäki, Finnish film director
- April 5 – Ivan Corea, Sri Lankan autism campaigner
- April 8 – Henry Cluney, Irish musician
- April 9 – Seve Ballesteros, Spanish golfer (d. 2011)
- April 12 – Vince Gill, American singer-songwriter
- April 14 – Mikhail Pletnev, Russian pianist, conductor and composer
- April 17 – Afrika Bambaataa, American DJ and producer (d. 2026)
- April 19 – Mukesh Ambani, Indian businessman
- April 21
  - Herbert Wetterauer, German artist and author
  - Faustin-Archange Touadéra, 8th President of the Central African Republic
- April 22 – Donald Tusk, Prime Minister of Poland
- April 23
  - Jan Hooks, American actress and comedian (d. 2014)
  - Kenji Kawai, Japanese composer
- April 24 – Nazir Ahmed, Baron Ahmed, Pakistani-British Labour Party politician and convicted sex offender
- April 25
  - Eric Bristow, English darts player (d. 2018)
  - Roch Marc Christian Kaboré, 7th Prime Minister and 8th President of Burkina Faso
- April 28 – Dinorah de Jesús Rodriguez, Cuban-born experimental filmmaker
- April 29
  - Daniel Day-Lewis, English-born actor
  - Timothy Treadwell, American environmentalist and filmmaker (d. 2003)

=== May ===
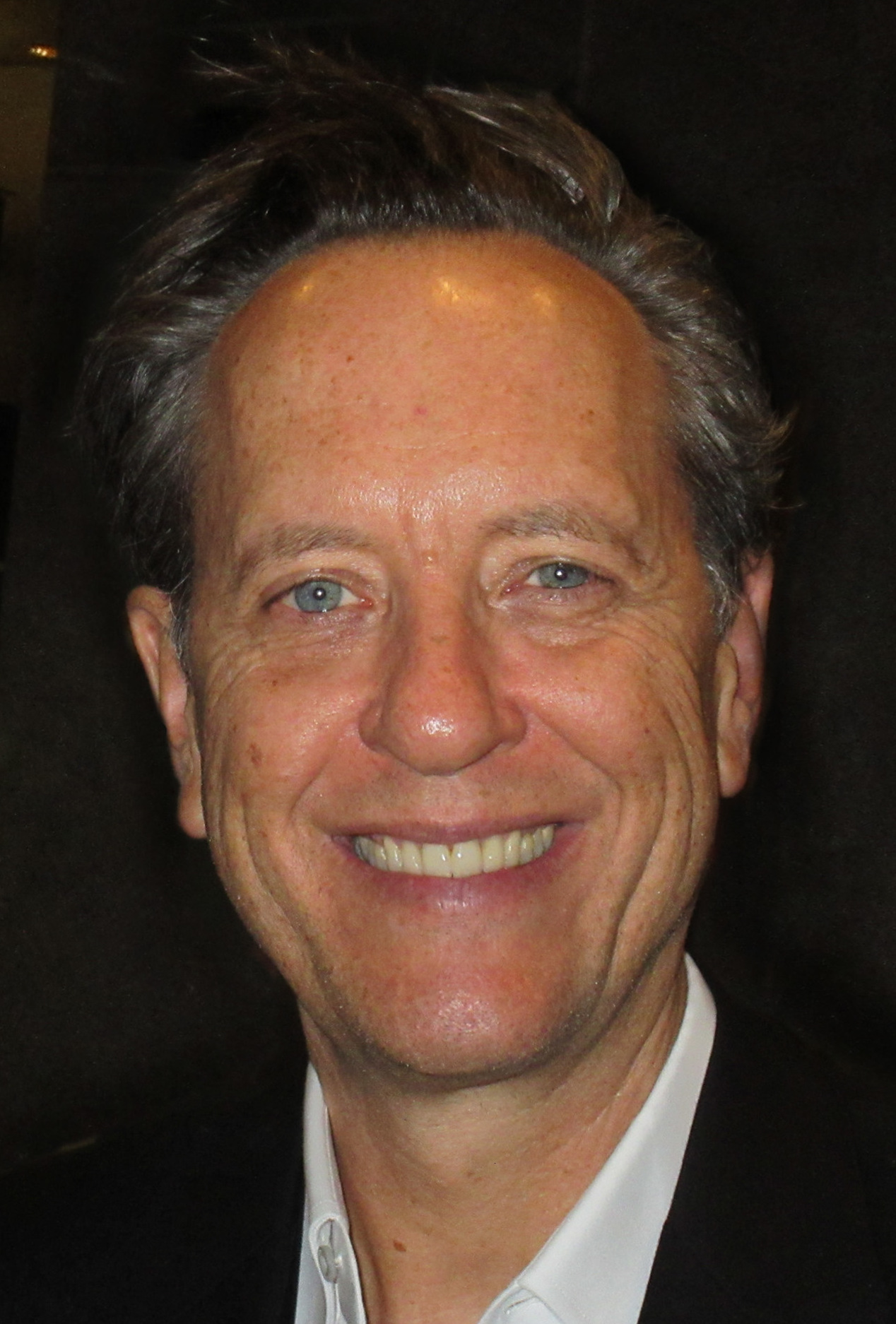
Richard E. Grant

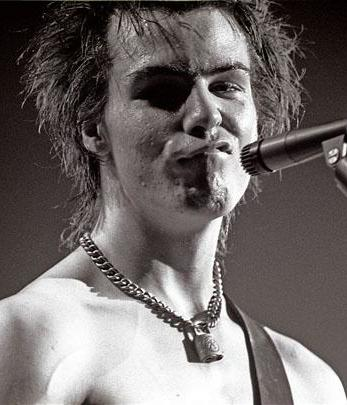
Sid Vicious

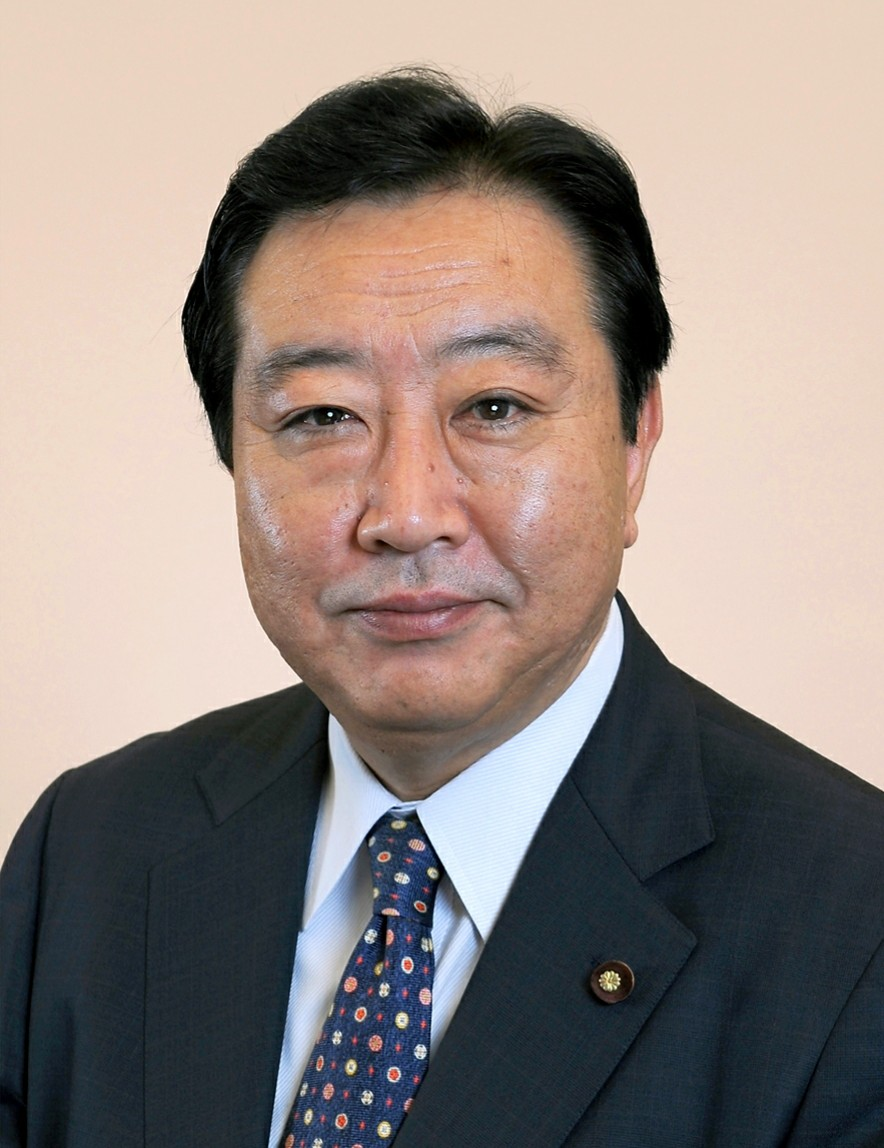
Yoshihiko Noda

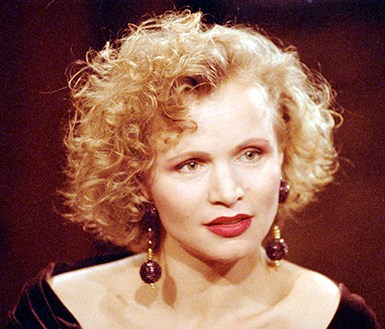
Renée Soutendijk

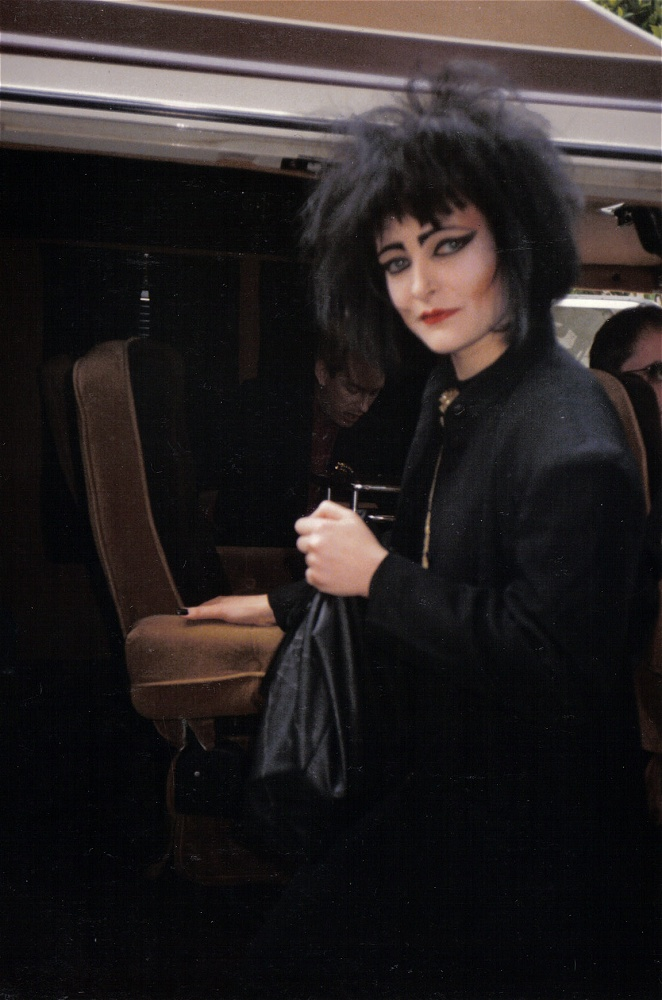
Siouxsie Sioux

- May 1 – Jo Jorgensen, American libertarian politician and academic
- May 3 – Jo Brand, English comedian
- May 5 – Richard E. Grant, English actor
- May 10 – Sid Vicious (John Beverley), English punk rock bassist (Sex Pistols) (d. 1979)
- May 13 – Carrie Lam, Hong Kong civil servant
- May 14 – Daniela Dessì, Italian operatic soprano (d. 2016)
- May 15
  - Kevin Von Erich, American professional wrestler
  - Juan José Ibarretxe, Basque Lehendakari (Prime Minister)
- May 16
  - Joan Benoit, American Olympic gold medal-winning marathon runner
  - Pipiet Senja, Indonesian writer (d. 2025)
  - Bob Suter, American professional ice hockey player (d. 2014)
- May 17 – Gösta Sundqvist, Finnish rock singer and songwriter (Leevi and the Leavings) (d. 2003)
- May 18
  - Michael Cretu, Romanian–German new-age musician (Enigma)
  - Frank Plasberg, German journalist and television presenter
- May 20 – Yoshihiko Noda, 62nd Prime Minister of Japan
- May 21
  - Rebecca Jones, Mexican actress
  - Judge Reinhold, American actor
  - Renée Soutendijk, Dutch actress
- May 22
  - Shinji Morisue, Japanese gymnast
  - Gary Sweet, Australian actor
- May 23 – Jimmy McShane (aka Baltimora), Northern Irish singer and dancer (d. 1995)
- May 24
  - John Harrington, American professional ice hockey player
  - Walter Moers, German comic artist and writer
  - John G. Rowland, American Republican politician, Governor of Connecticut and felon
- May 26
  - François Legault, Canadian politician, Premier of Quebec
  - Pontso Sekatle, Lesotho academic and politician
- May 27 – Siouxsie Sioux, born Susan Ballion, English post-punk singer (Siouxsie and the Banshees)
- May 28 – Kirk Gibson, American baseball player
- May 29 – Ted Levine, American actor
- May 31 – Jim Craig, American professional ice hockey player

=== June ===
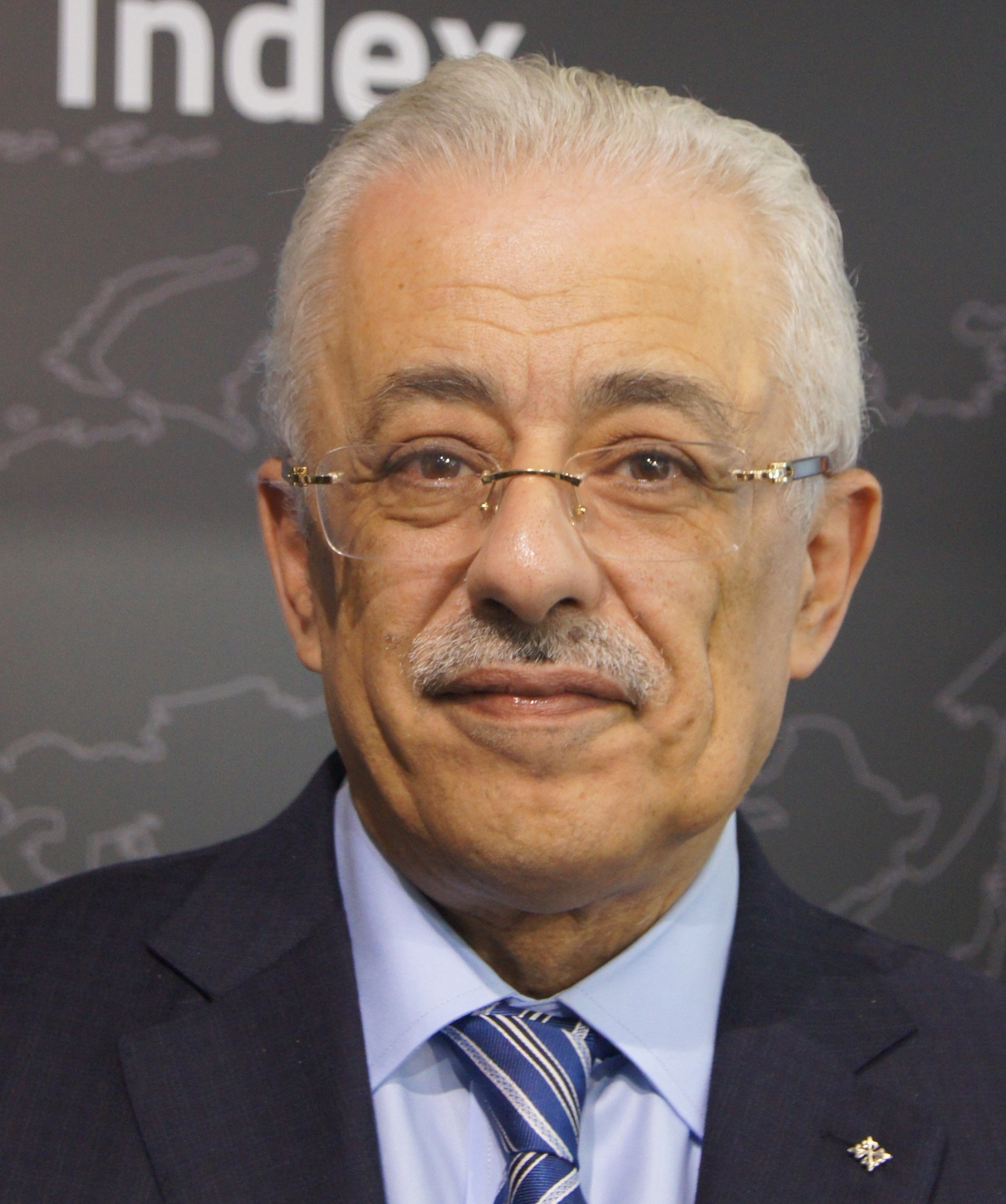
Tarek Shawki

Frances McDormand

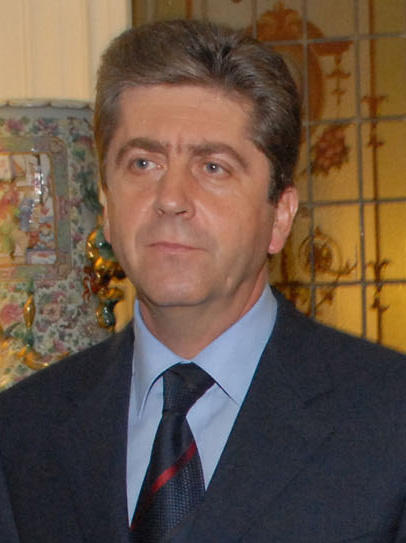
Georgi Parvanov

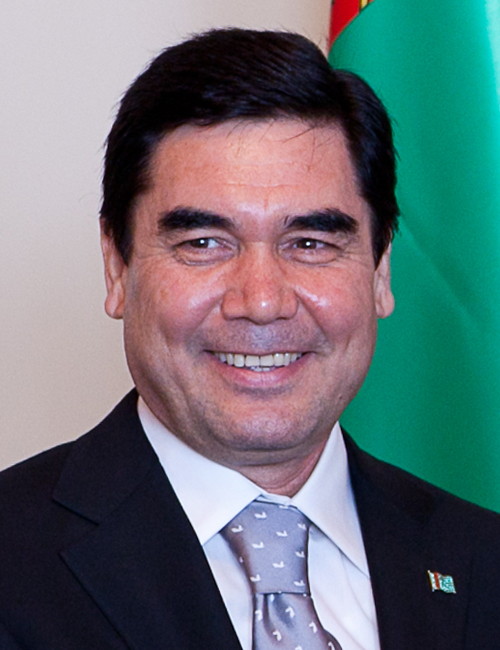
Gurbanguly Berdimuhamedow

- June 1 – Dorota Kędzierzawska, Polish film director
- June 3 – Horst-Ulrich Hänel, German field hockey player
- June 5 – Kim Tai-chung, Korean martial artist and former actor and Bruce Lee double (d. 2011)
- June 7 – Juan Luis Guerra, Dominican singer and songwriter
- June 8
  - Scott Adams, American cartoonist (Dilbert) (d. 2026)
  - Dimple Kapadia, Indian actress
- June 12
  - Timothy Busfield, American actor
  - Gamal Al-Ghandour, Egyptian football referee
  - Javed Miandad, Pakistani cricketer
  - Tarek Shawki, Egyptian academic, 25th Minister of Education and Technical Education in Egypt
- June 14 – Maxi Jazz, British musician, rapper, singer-songwriter and DJ (d. 2022)
- June 15 – Seppo Pääkkönen, Finnish actor
- June 19 – Anna Lindh, Swedish politician (d. 2003)
- June 21
  - Michael Bowen, American actor
  - Luis Antonio Tagle, Filipino cardinal, Archbishop of Manila
- June 23 – Frances McDormand, American actress
- June 25 – William Goh, Archbishop of Singapore
- June 27 – Erik Hamrén, Swedish football player
- June 28 – Georgi Parvanov, President of Bulgaria
- June 29 – Gurbanguly Berdimuhamedow, Turkmen politician, 2nd President of Turkmenistan
- June 30 – Silvio Orlando, Italian actor

=== July ===
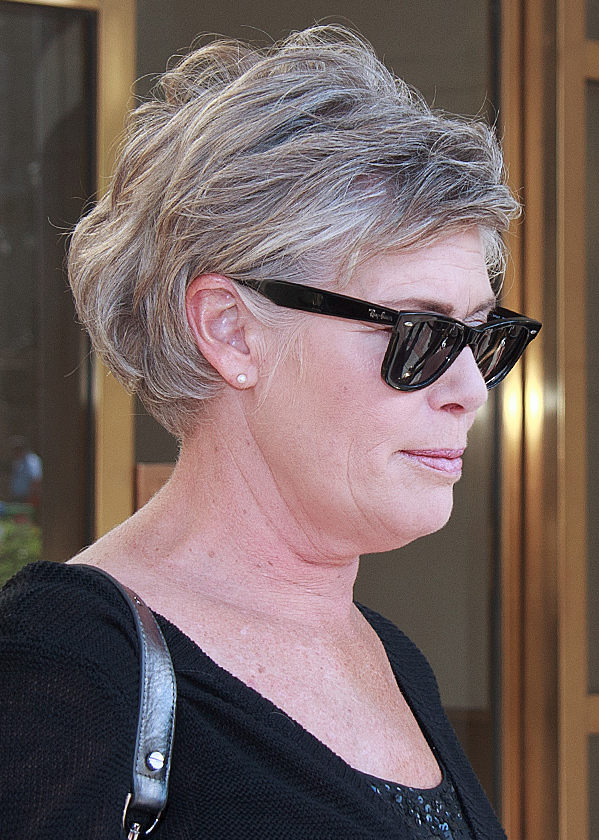
Kelly McGillis

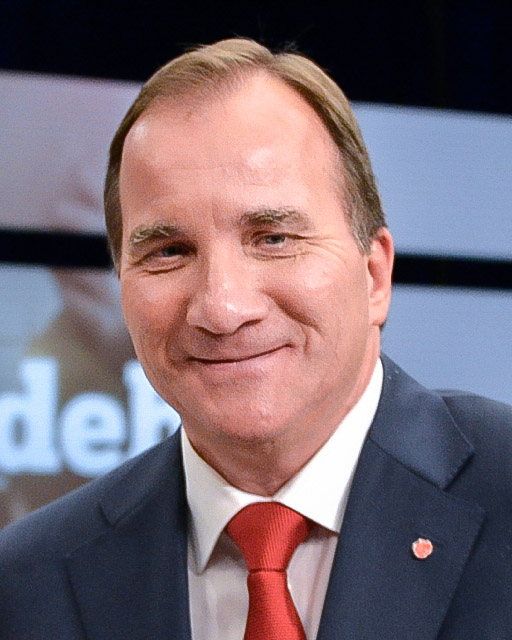
Stefan Löfven

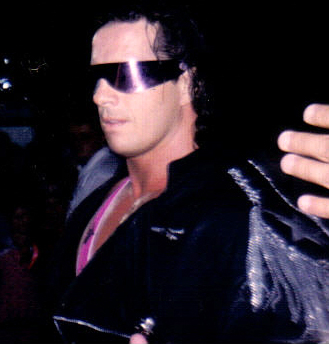
Bret Hart

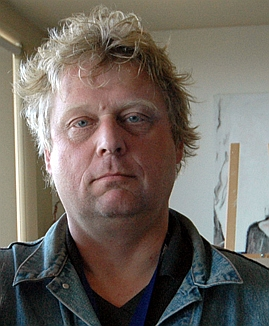
Theo van Gogh

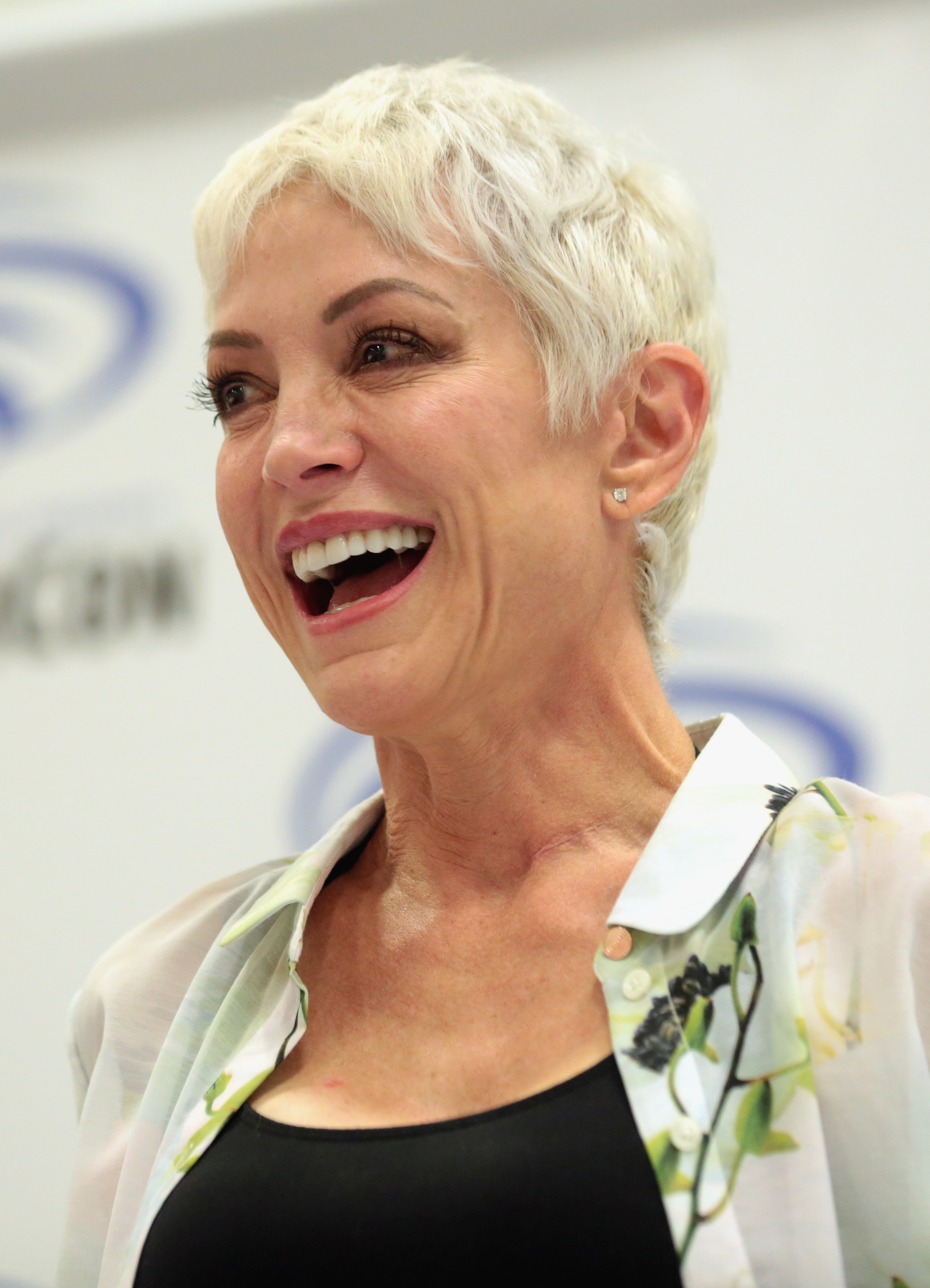
Nana Visitor

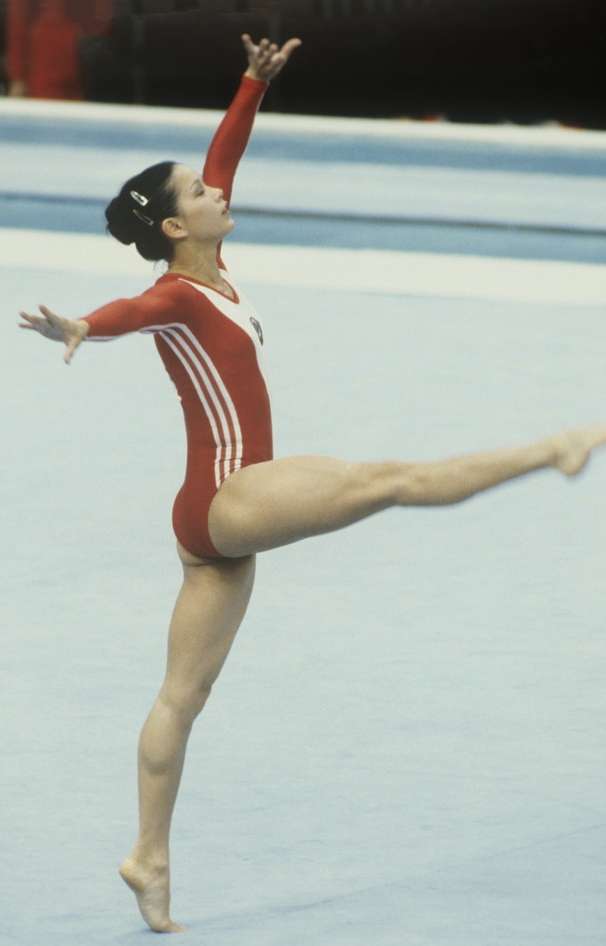
Nellie Kim

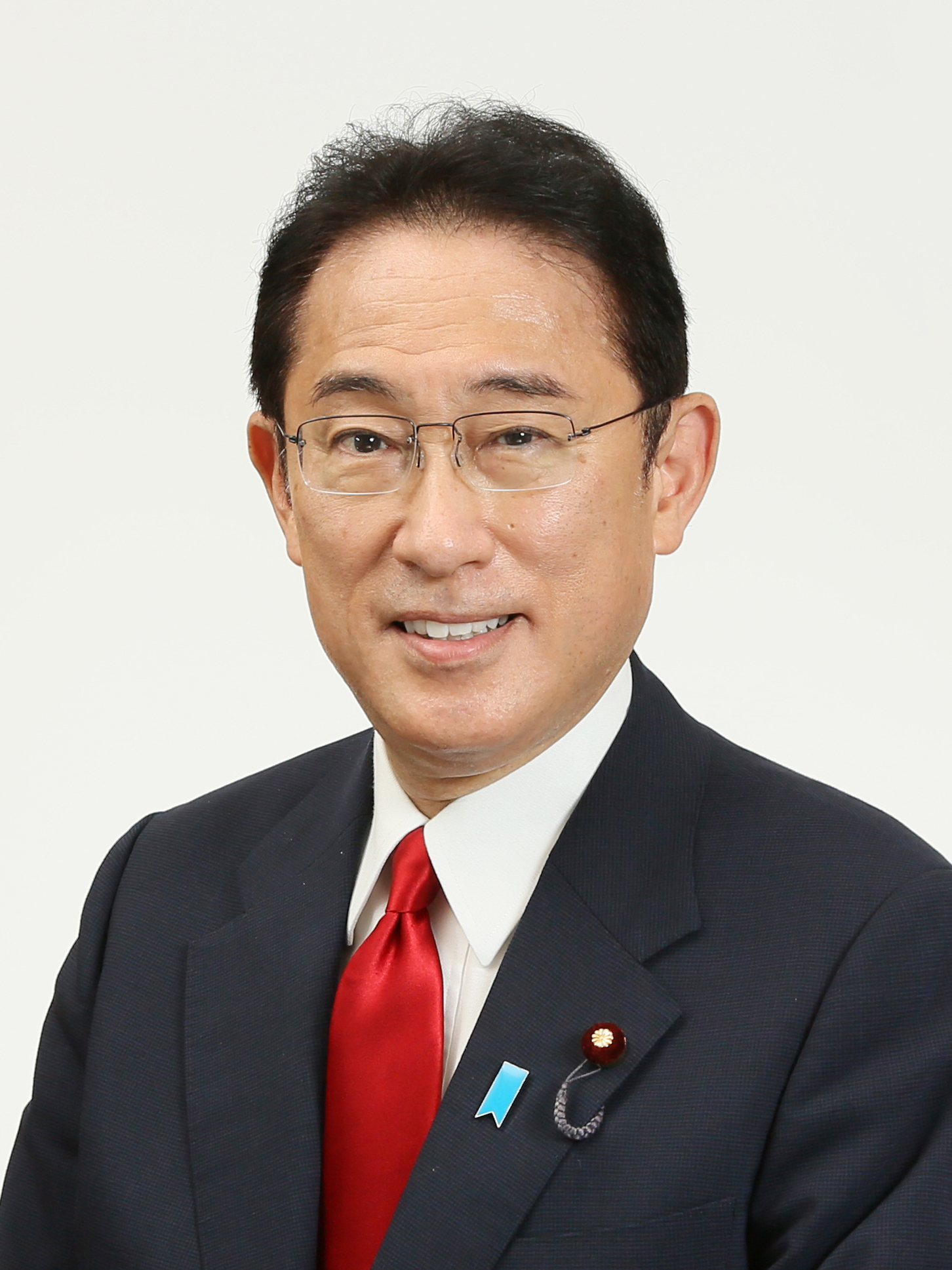
Fumio Kishida

- July 2 – Bret Hart, Canadian professional wrestler
- July 4
  - Princess Chulabhorn of Thailand
  - Jenny Seagrove, English actress
  - M. Nasir, Singaporean-Malaysian poet, singer-songwriter, composer, producer, actor and film director
  - Dmitry Nazarov, Soviet-Russian actor
- July 5 – Doug Wilson, Canadian ice hockey
- July 7 – Mohd Puad Zarkashi, Malaysian politician
- July 9
  - Paul Merton, English writer, actor, comedian, radio and television presenter
  - Marc Almond, English singer
  - Kelly McGillis, American actress
- July 10
  - Cindy Sheehan, American anti-war activist
  - Tô Lâm, 13th & 15th President of Vietnam
- July 12 – Rick Husband, American astronaut (d. 2003)
- July 13
  - Lília Cabral, Brazilian actress
  - Cameron Crowe, American writer and film director
- July 17 – Shinobu Otake, Japanese actress
- July 18 – Nick Faldo, British golfer
- July 21
  - Jon Lovitz, American actor and comedian
  - Stefan Löfven, 33rd Prime Minister of Sweden
- July 23 – Theo van Gogh, Dutch film director (d. 2004)
- July 24 – Shavkat Mirziyoyev, Uzbek politician, 3rd Prime Minister of Uzbekistan and 2nd President of Uzbekistan
- July 26
  - Yuen Biao, Hong Kong actor
  - Nana Visitor, American actress
- July 27 – Hansi Müller, German footballer
- July 29
  - Nellie Kim, Russian gymnast
  - Fumio Kishida, 100th Prime Minister of Japan

=== August ===
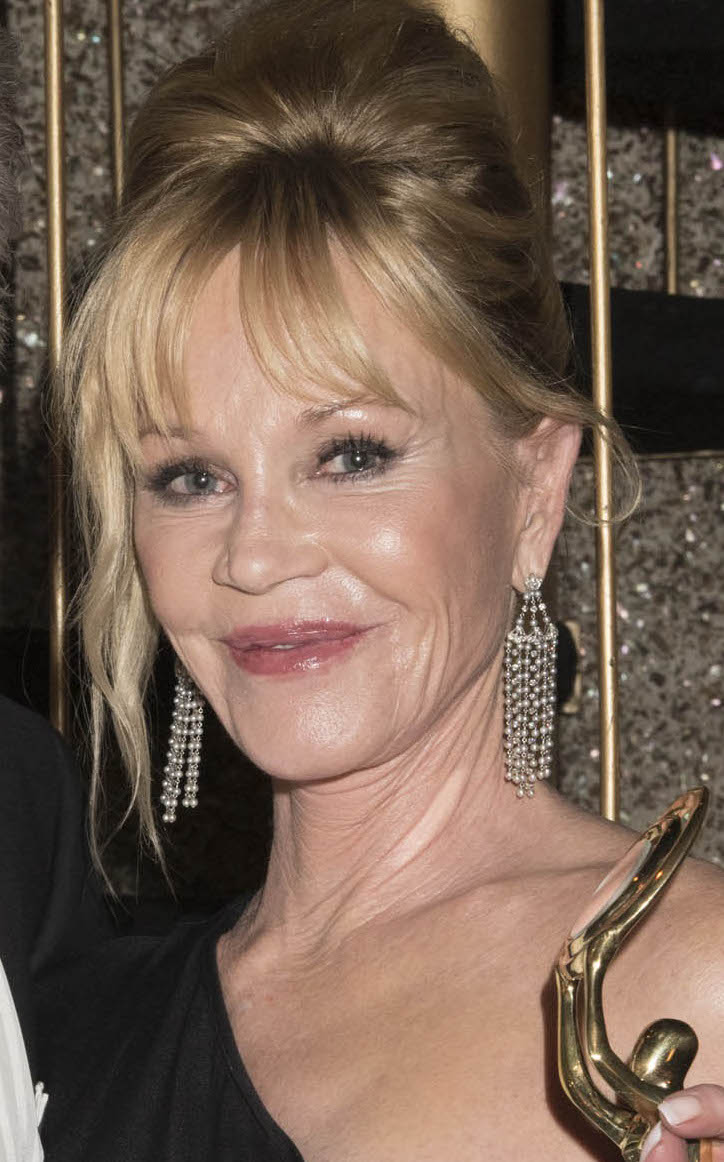
Melanie Griffith

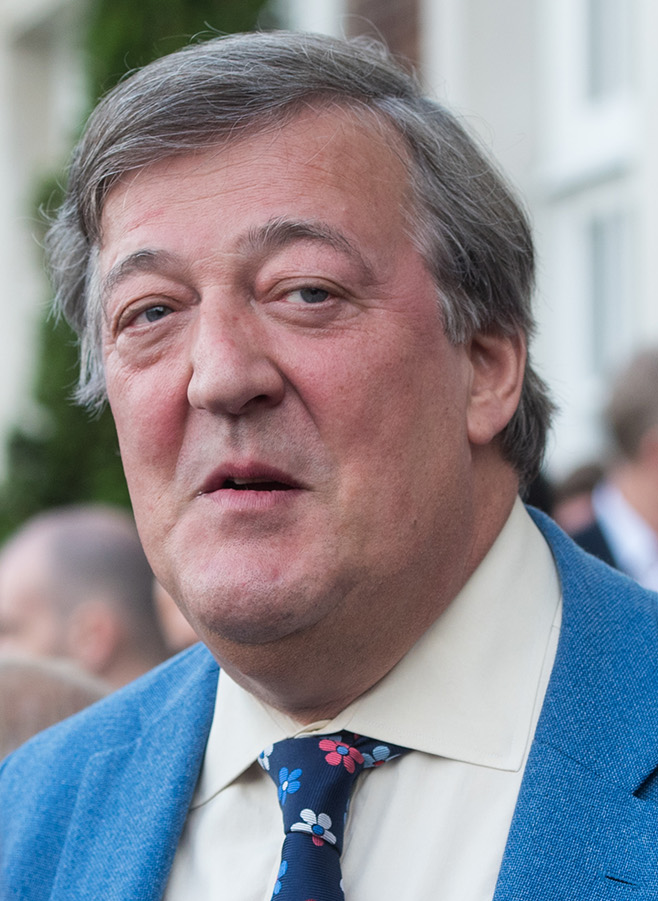
Stephen Fry

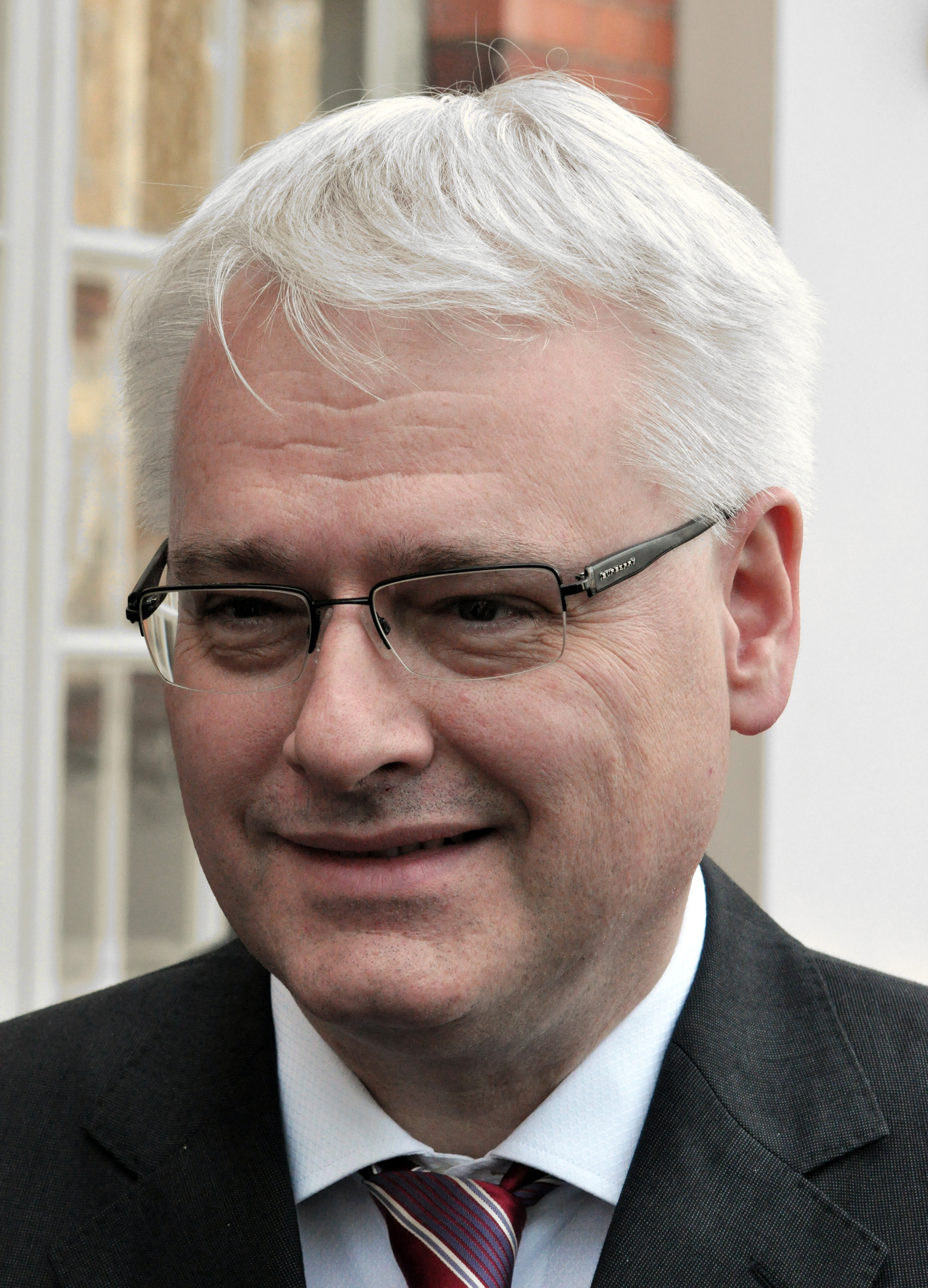
Ivo Josipović

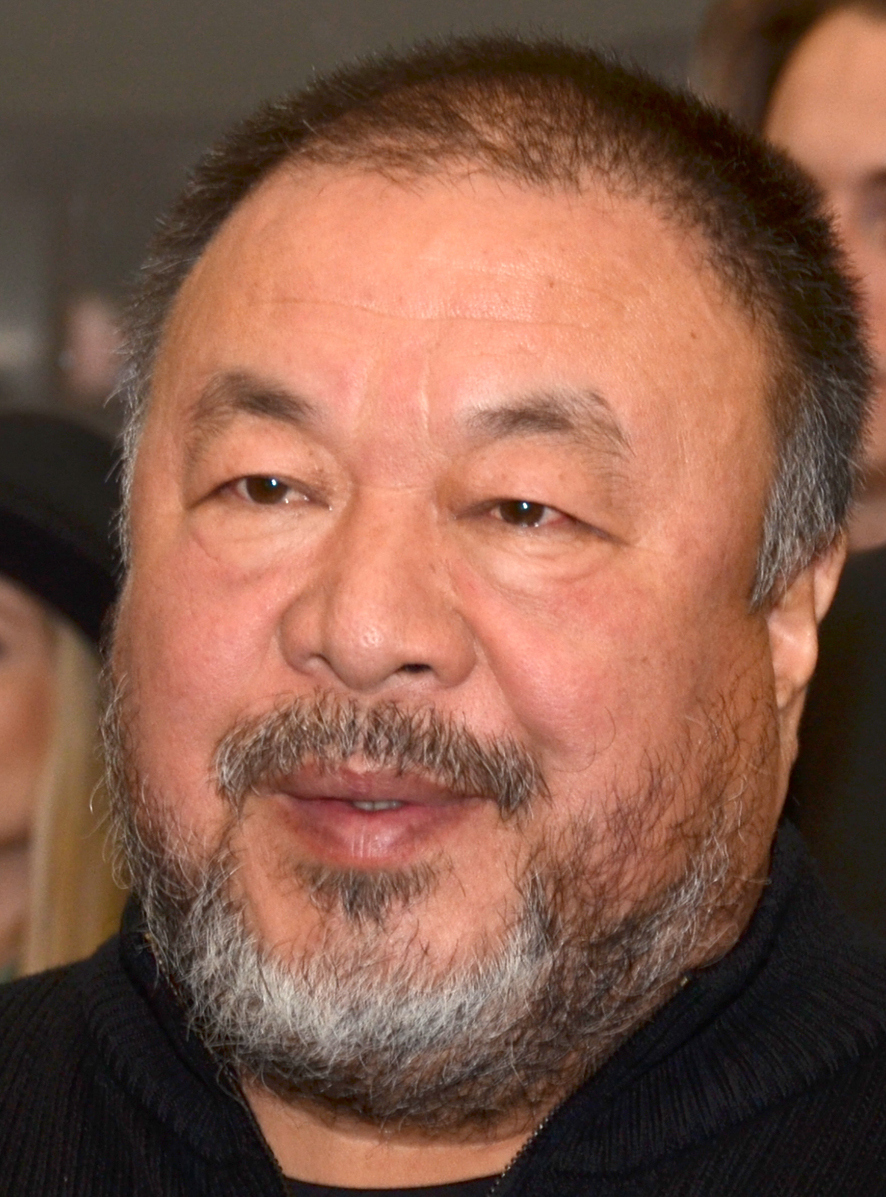
Ai Weiwei

- August 2 – Lo' Lo' Mohd Ghazali, Malaysian politician (d. 2011)
- August 4 – John Wark, Scottish footballer
- August 6 – Jim McGreevey, 52nd Governor of New Jersey
- August 7 – Alexander Dityatin, Soviet gymnast
- August 9 – Melanie Griffith, American actress
- August 10 – Juli Básti, Hungarian actress
- August 15 – Željko Ivanek, Slovenian-American actor
- August 16
  - Tim Farriss, Australian rock guitarist (INXS)
  - Laura Innes, American actress and director
  - Phil Murphy, American politician
- August 17 – Robin Cousins, British figure skater
- August 18
  - Carole Bouquet, French actress
  - Denis Leary, American comedian and actor
- August 19 – Li-Young Lee, Indonesian-born poet
- August 20 – Finlay Calder, Scottish rugby player
- August 22 – Steve Davis, British snooker player
- August 24 – Stephen Fry, British comedian, author and actor
- August 25 – Simon McBurney, British actor, writer and theatre director
- August 26
  - Dr. Alban, Nigerian-born Swedish singer
  - Uzo, Nigerian-American film producer and director
- August 27 – Bernhard Langer, German golfer
- August 28
  - Ivo Josipović, President of Croatia
  - Rick Rossovich, American actor
  - Daniel Stern, American actor
  - Ai Weiwei, Chinese artist, philosopher
- August 29
  - Grzegorz Ciechowski, Polish musician (d. 2001)
  - Shirō Sagisu, Japanese composer
- August 30 – Manu Tuiasosopo, American football player
- August 31
  - Gina Schock, American drummer (The Go-Go's)
  - Ingrid Washinawatok, Native American activist (d. 1999)

=== September ===
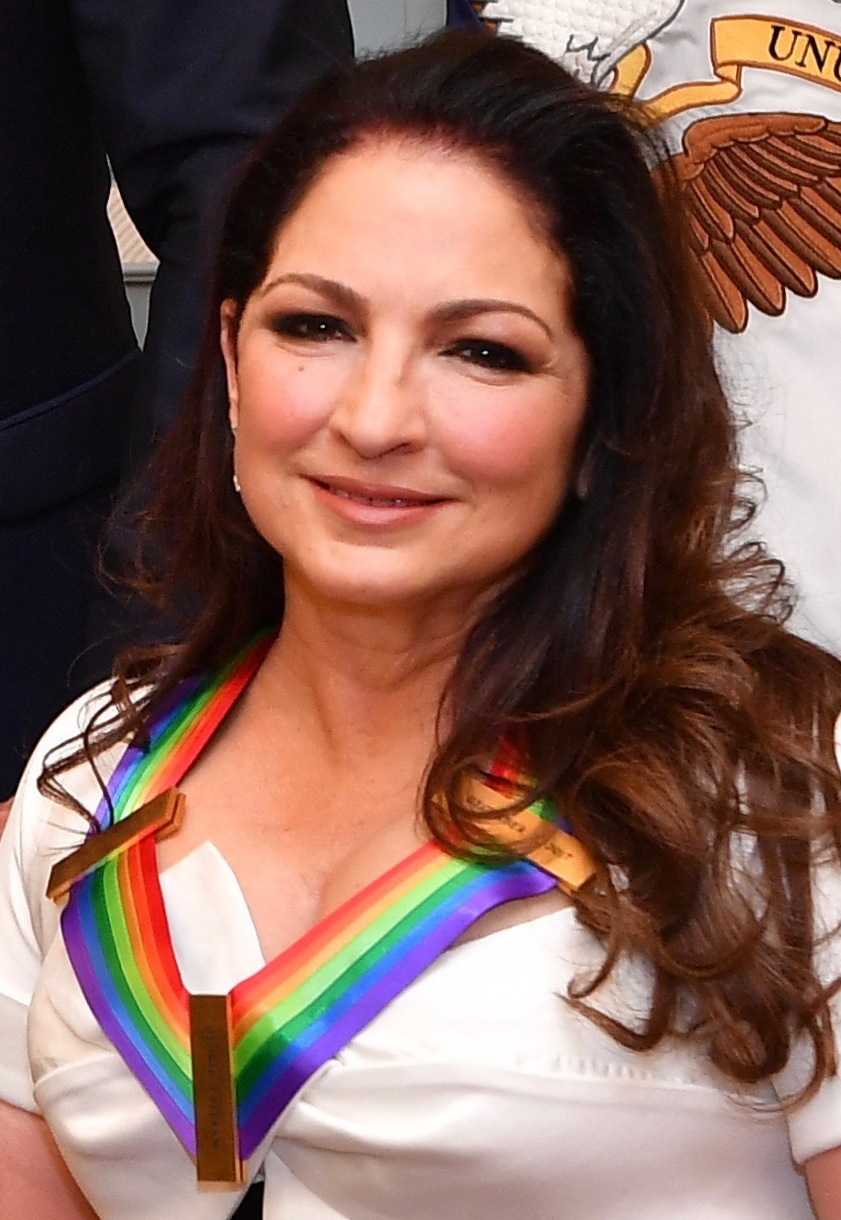
Gloria Estefan

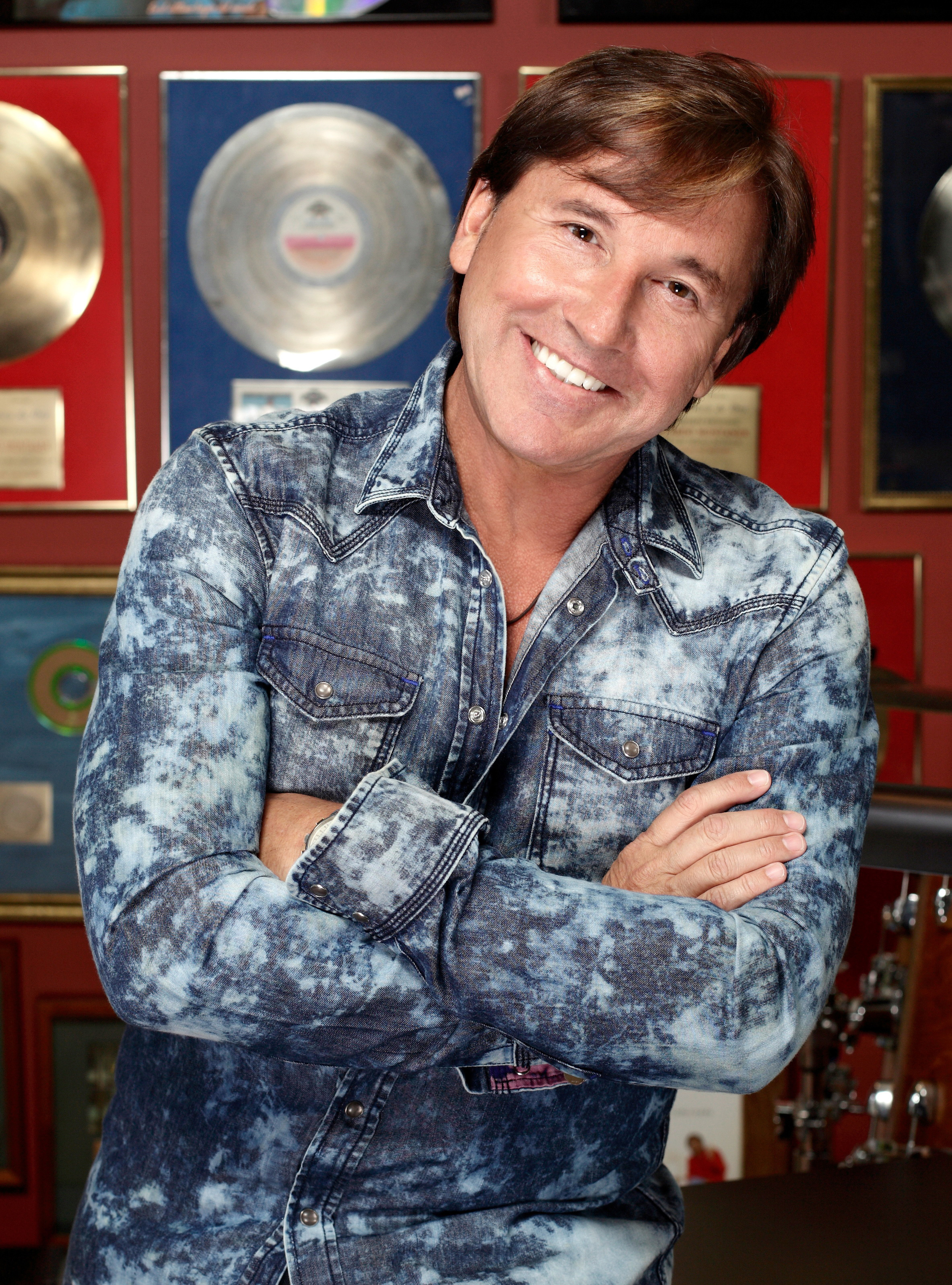
Ricardo Montaner

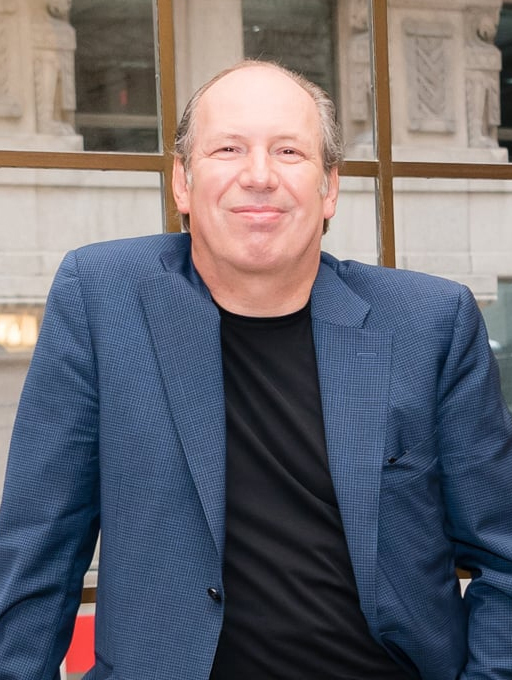
Hans Zimmer

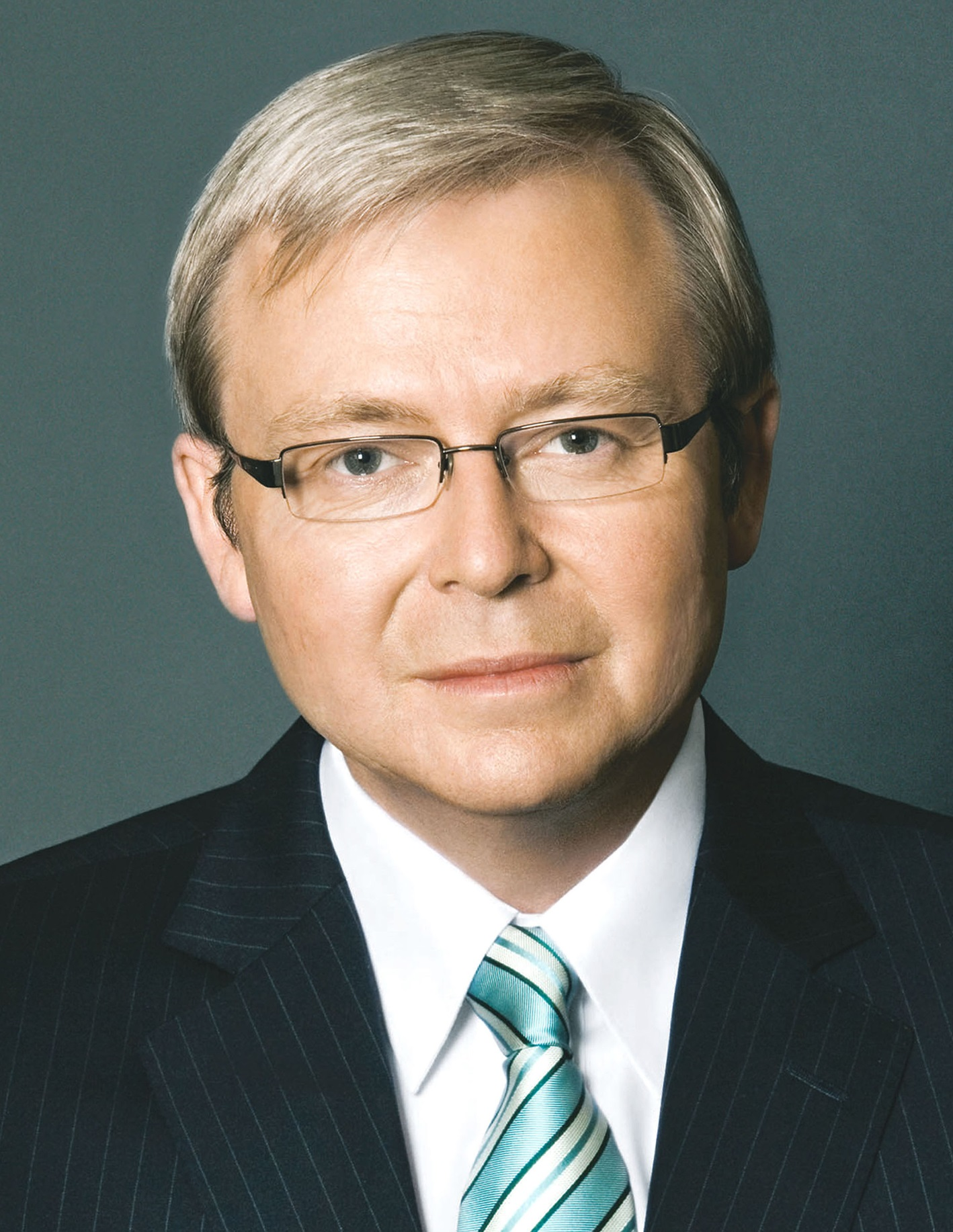
Kevin Rudd

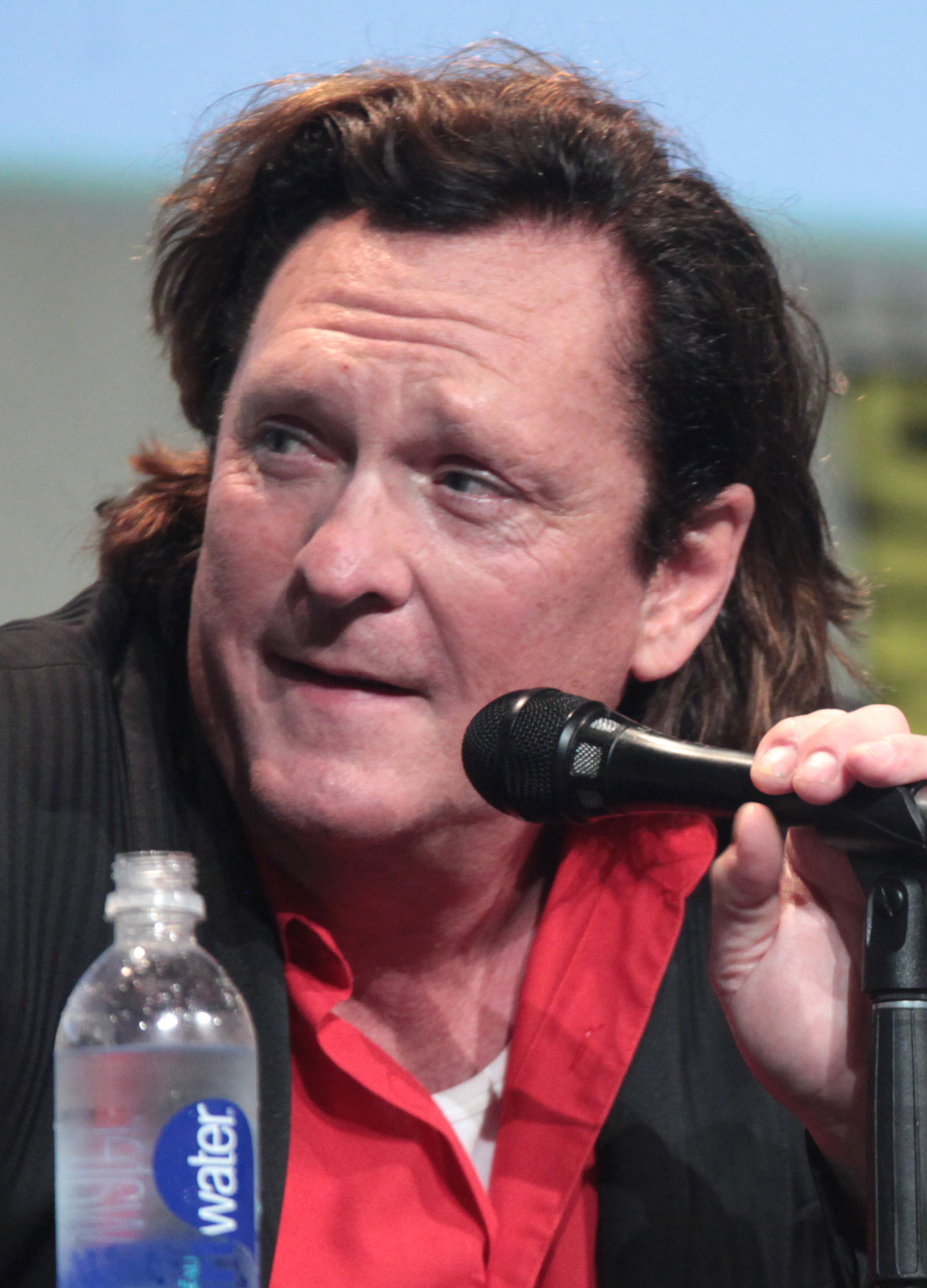
Michael Madsen

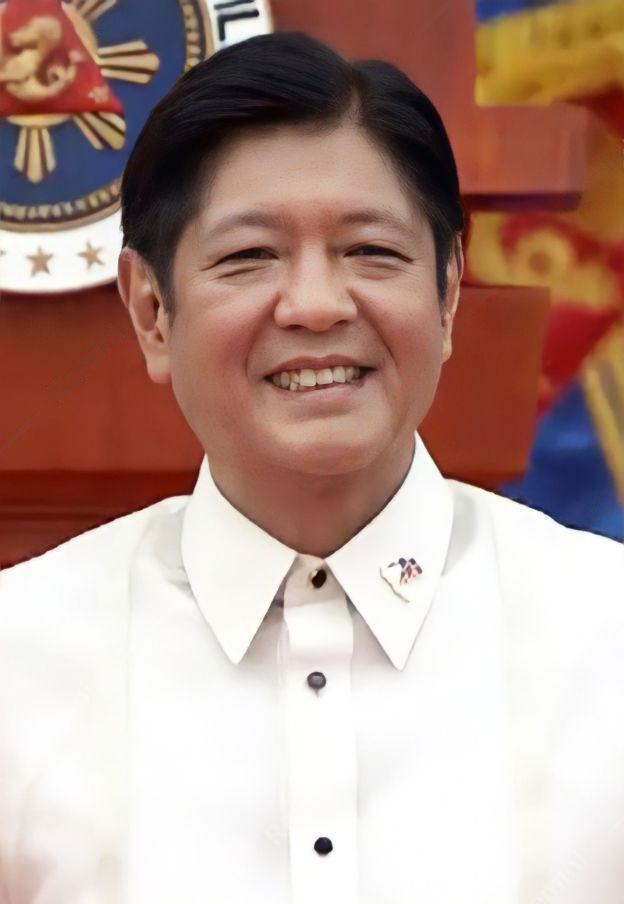
Bongbong Marcos

- September 1 – Gloria Estefan, Cuban-born American singer
- September 6 – José Sócrates, 117th Prime Minister of Portugal
- September 7 – Ewa Kasprzyk, Polish athlete
- September 8 – Ricardo Montaner, Argentine-born Venezuelan singer
- September 11 – Preben Elkjær, Danish footballer
- September 12
  - Jan Egeland, Norwegian politician, diplomat and humanitarian
  - Kadim Al Sahir, Iraqi singer
  - Rachel Ward, English-born actress
  - Hans Zimmer, German composer
- September 13
  - Bongbong Marcos, 17th President of the Philippines
  - Cesare Bocci, Italian actor
  - Mal Donaghy, Northern Irish footballer
- September 16 – David McCreery, Irish footballer
- September 18 – Mark Wells, American professional ice hockey player
- September 20 – Sabine Christiansen, German journalist and television presenter
- September 21
  - Ethan Coen, American film director, producer, screenwriter and editor
  - Kevin Rudd, 26th Prime Minister of Australia
- September 22
  - Nick Cave, Australian musician, songwriter, author, screenwriter and actor
  - Mark Johnson, American professional ice hockey player and coach
  - Dalia Reyes Barrios, Venezuelan art collector
- September 24 – Brad Bird, American animator, director, writer, producer and voice actor
- September 25 – Michael Madsen, American actor (d. 2025)
- September 26 – Luigi De Canio, Italian footballer and football manager
- September 27 – Peter Sellars, American theatre director
- September 29 – Andrew Dice Clay, American comedian
- September 30 – Fran Drescher, American actress

=== October ===
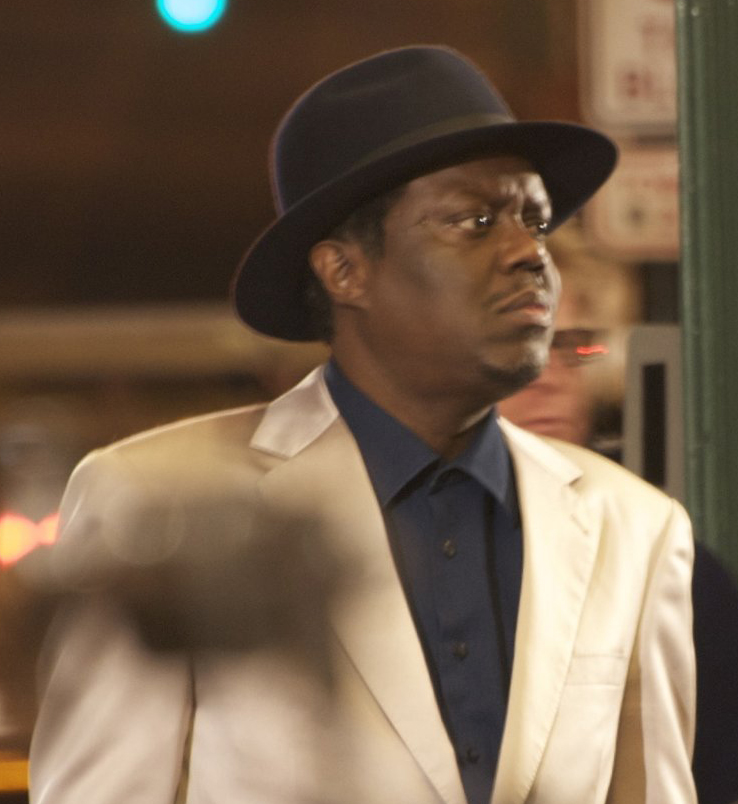
Bernie Mac

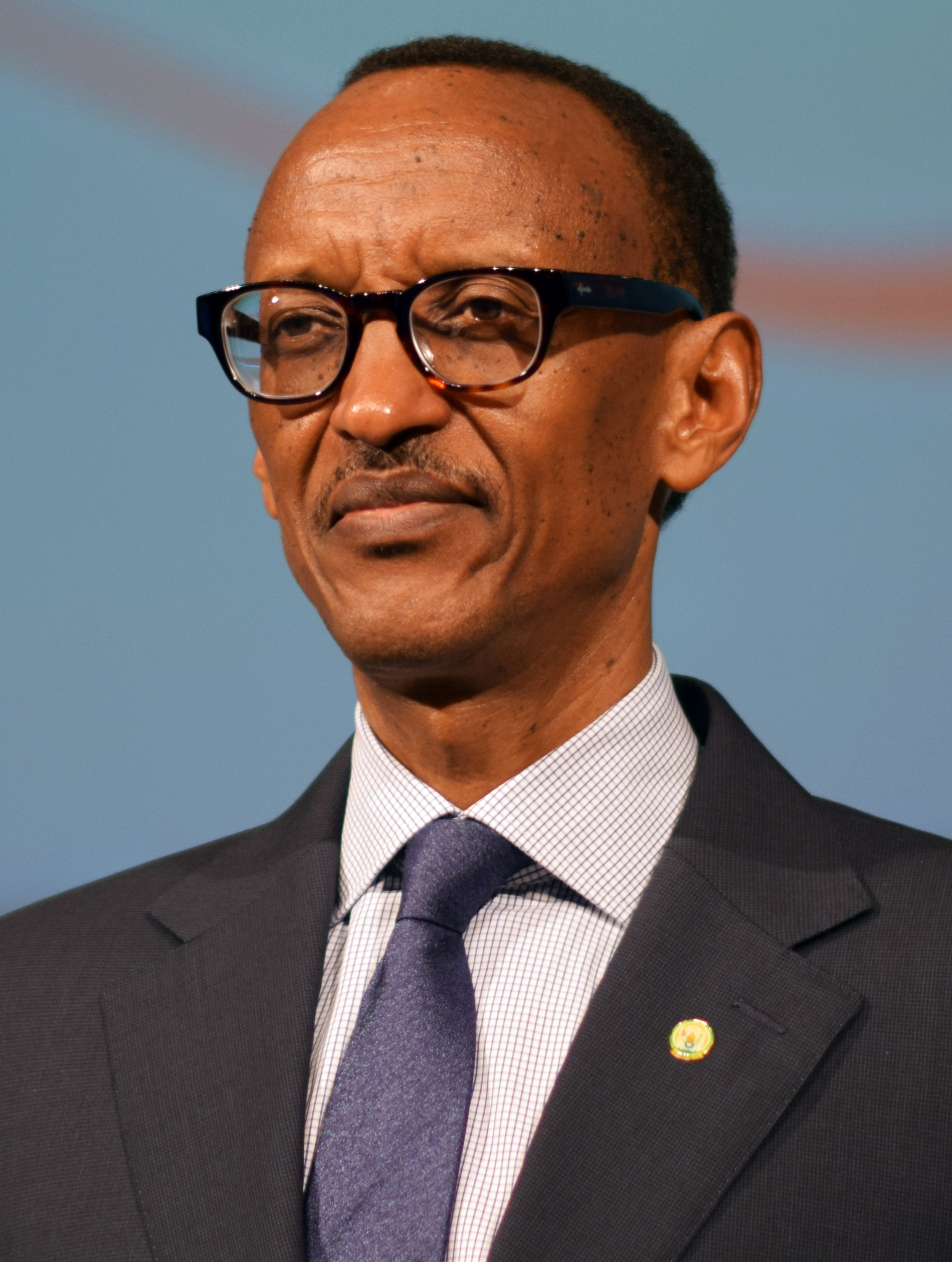
Paul Kagame

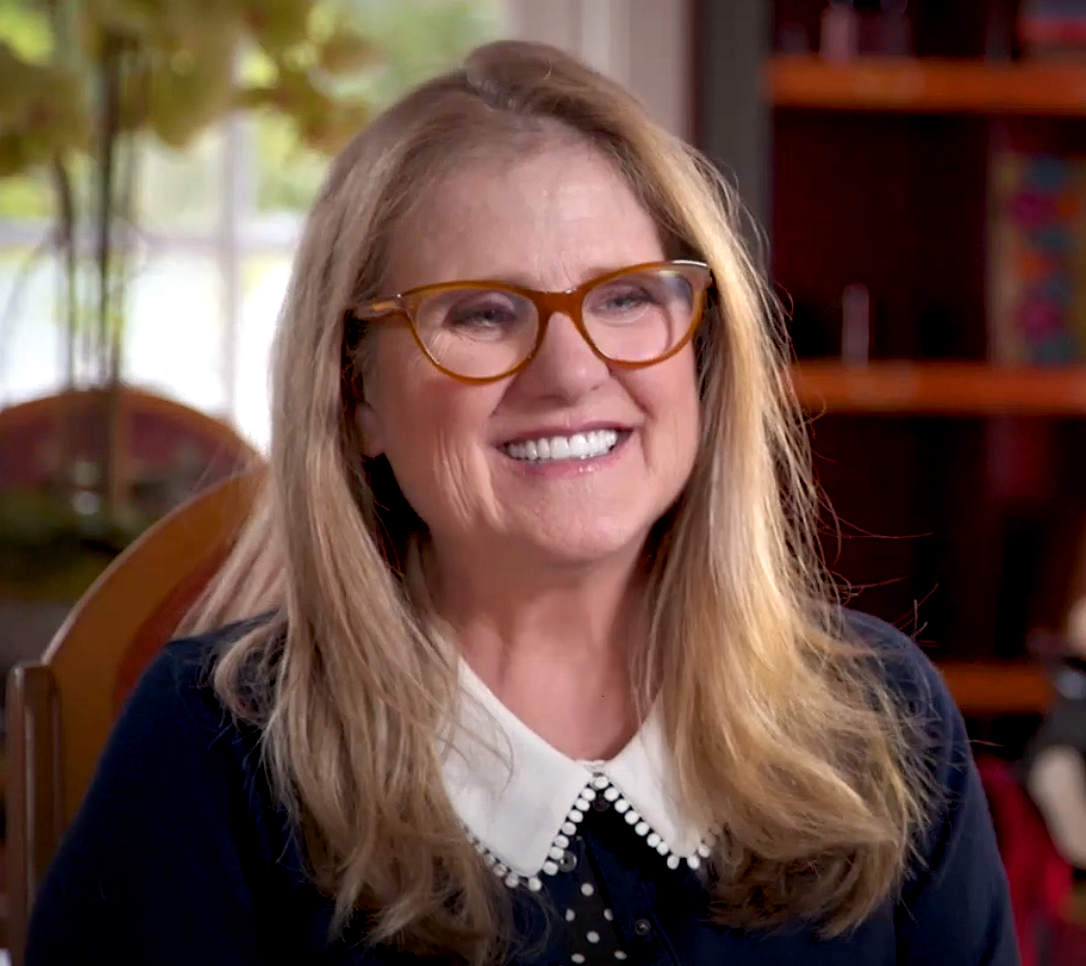
Nancy Cartwright

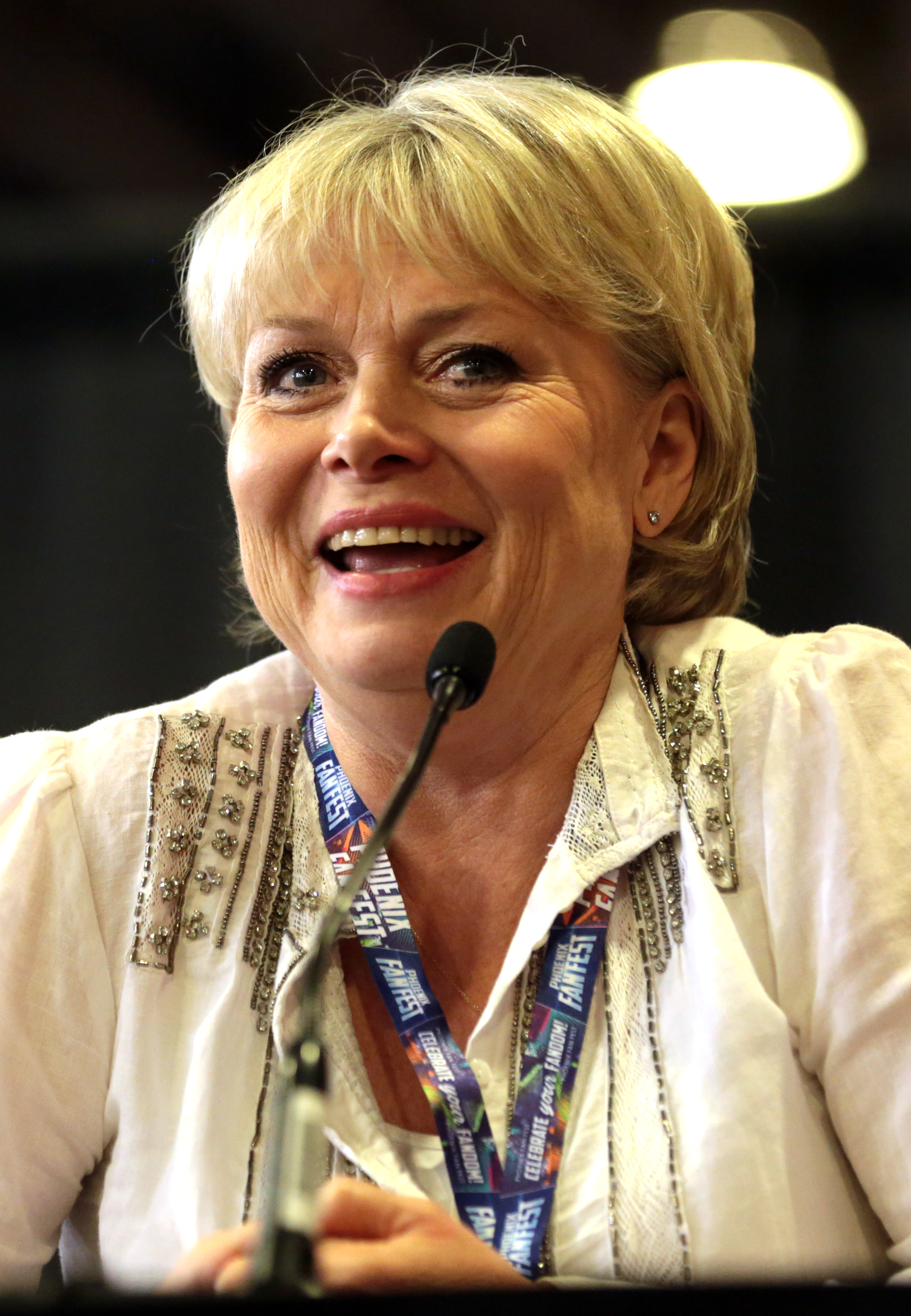
Julie Dawn Cole

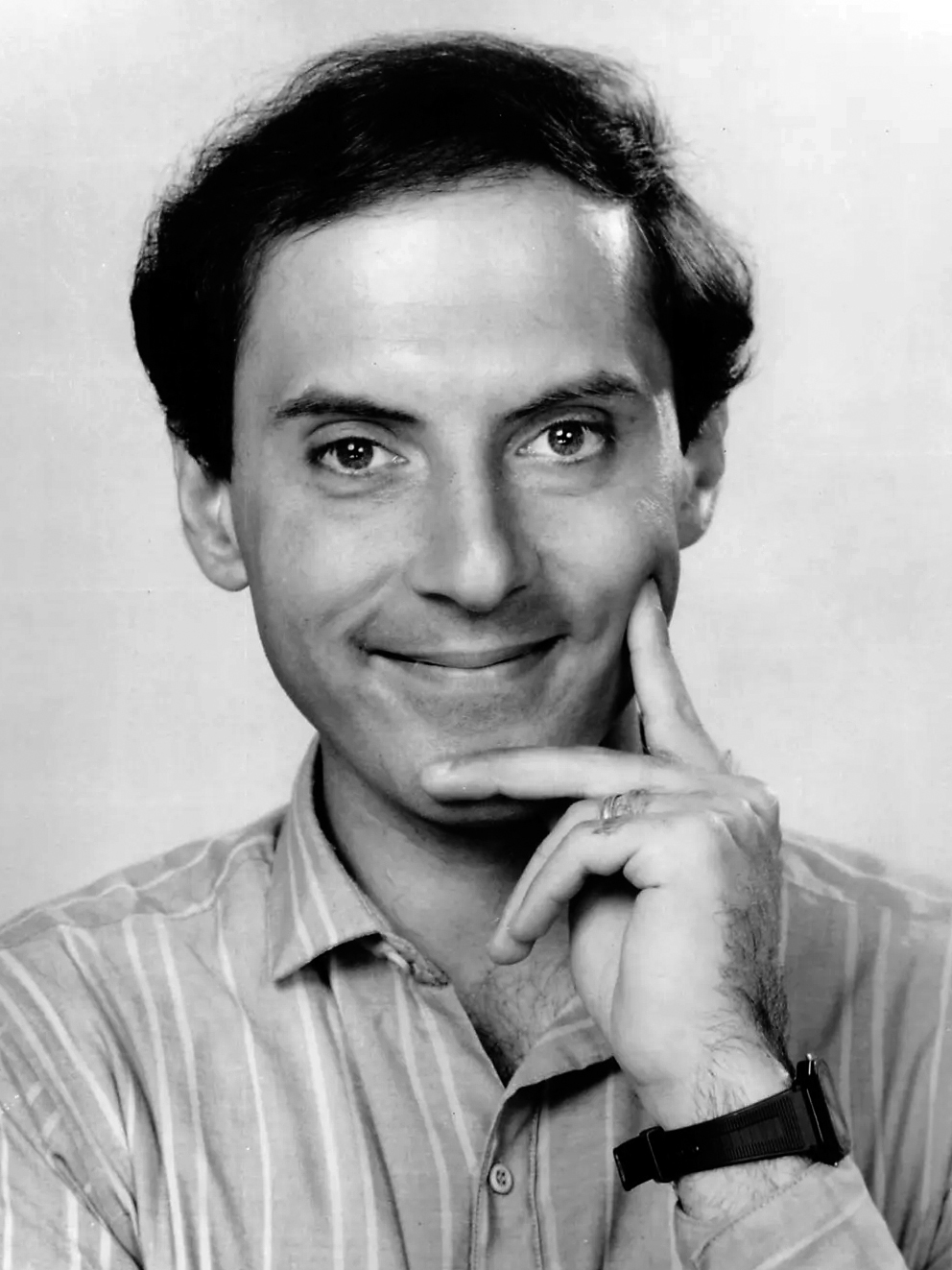
Dan Castellaneta

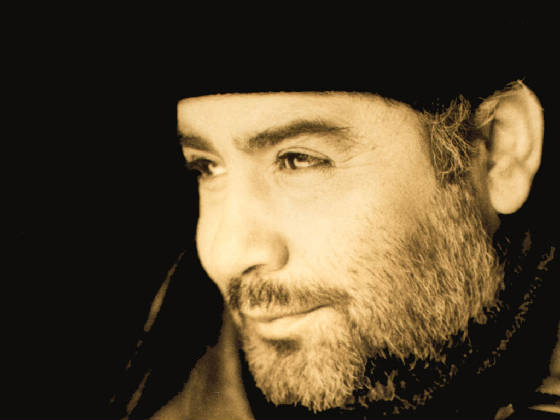
Ahmet Kaya

- October 4 – Bill Fagerbakke, American actor
- October 5 – Bernie Mac, African-American stand-up comedian and actor (d. 2008)
- October 7 – Jayne Torvill, British ice dancer and Olympian
- October 8
  - Magdalena Cajías, Bolivian academic, historian, and politician
- October 9 – Herman Brusselmans, Belgian novelist, poet, playwright and columnist
- October 10 – Rumiko Takahashi, Japanese manga artist
- October 11
  - Dawn French, British comedian
  - Eric Keenleyside, Canadian actor
- October 12 – Clémentine Célarié, French actress
- October 15
  - Mira Nair, Indian born-American film maker
  - Stacy Peralta, American director and skateboarder
- October 20 – Manuel Huerga, Spanish film director and screenwriter
- October 21
  - Wolfgang Ketterle, German physicist, Nobel Prize laureate
  - Steve Lukather, American guitarist, singer, songwriter, arranger and record producer
- October 22 – Daniel Melingo, Argentine musician
- October 23 – Paul Kagame, 4th President of Rwanda
- October 24 – John Kassir, American actor and comedian
- October 25 – Nancy Cartwright, American voice actress (Bart Simpson from The Simpsons)
- October 26
  - Julie Dawn Cole, English actress and psychotherapist
  - Bob Golic, American football player
- October 27
  - Jeff East, American actor
  - Tsai Ming-liang, Taiwanese film director
- October 28
  - Ahmet Kaya, Turkish folk singer (d. 2000)
  - Stephen Morris, British drummer
- October 29 – Dan Castellaneta, American voice actor (Homer Simpson from The Simpsons)
- October 30
  - Richard Jeni, American stand-up comedian and actor (d. 2007)
  - Kevin Pollak, American actor
- October 31
  - Shirley Phelps-Roper, American political and religious activist
  - Robert Pollard, American musician

=== November ===
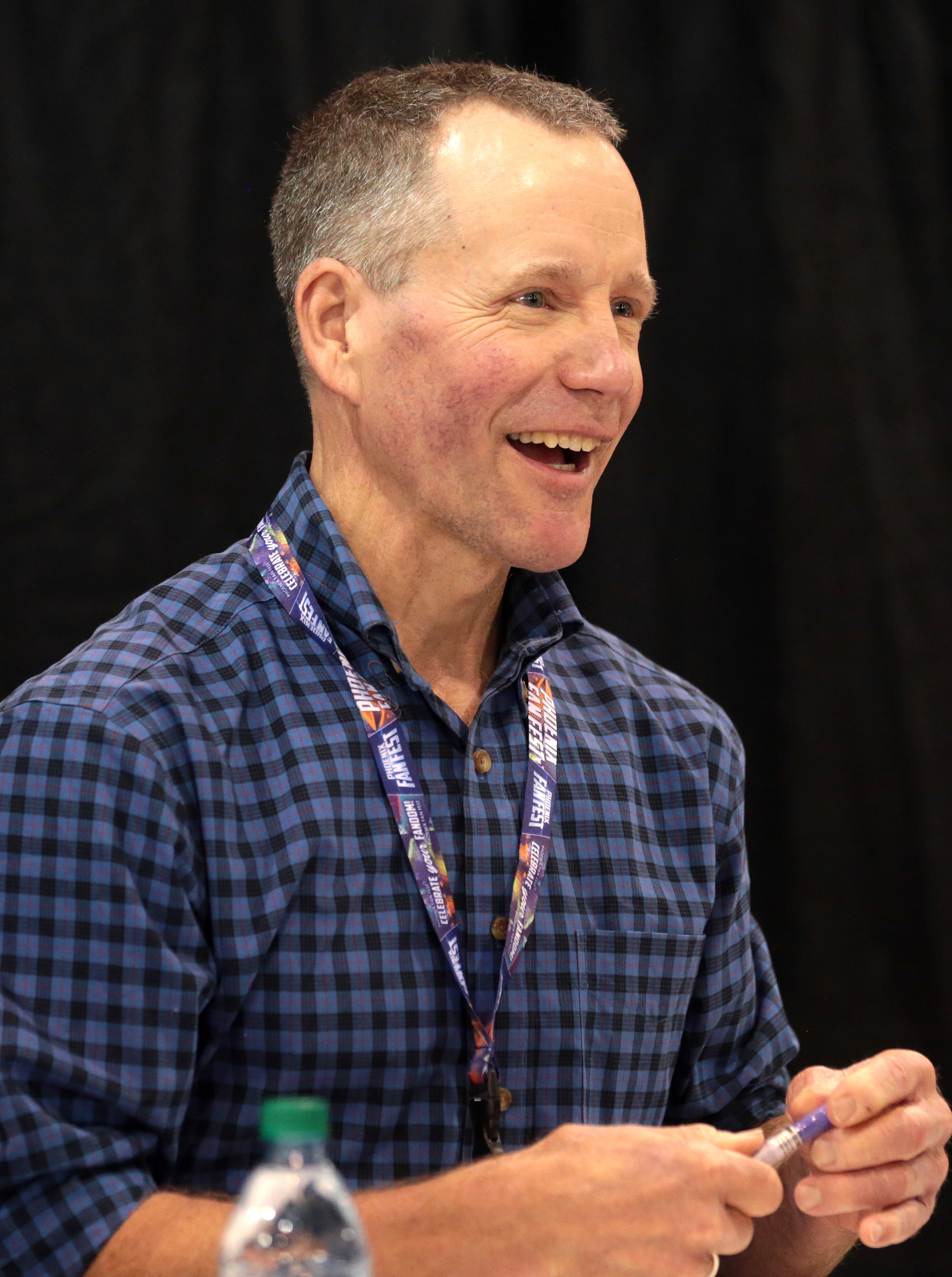
Peter Ostrum

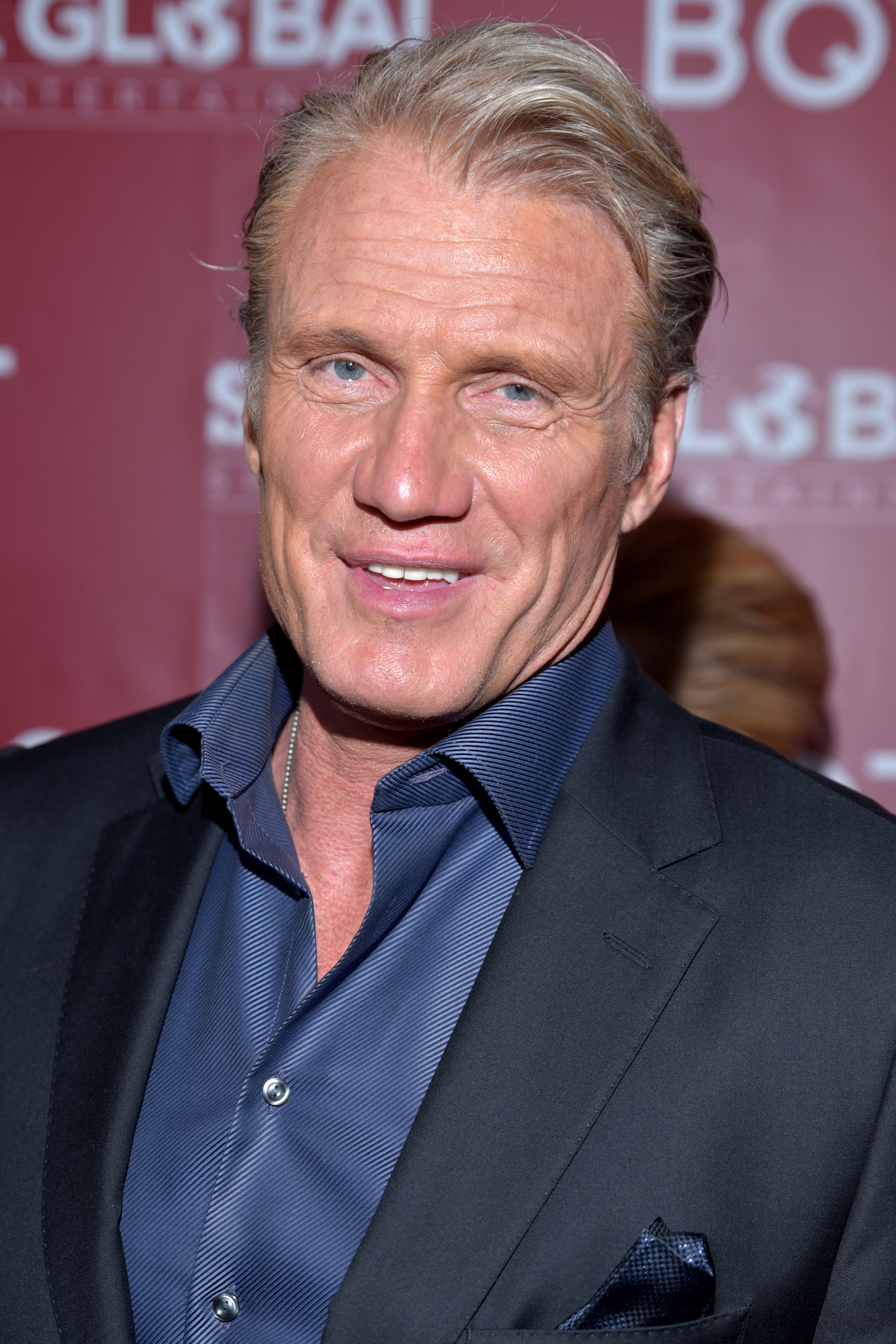
Dolph Lundgren

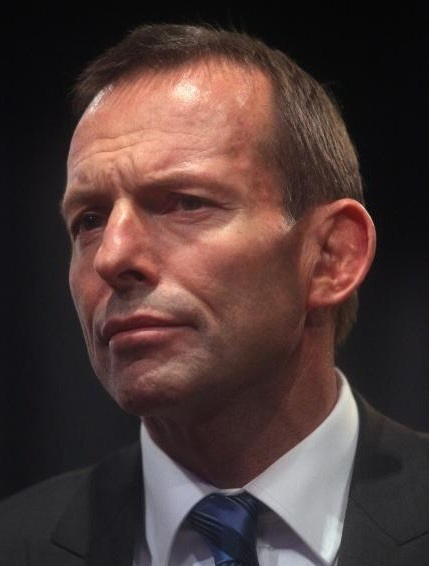
Tony Abbott

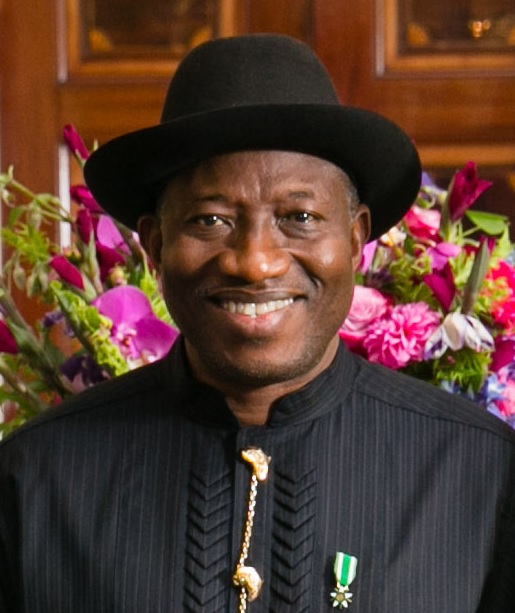
Goodluck Jonathan

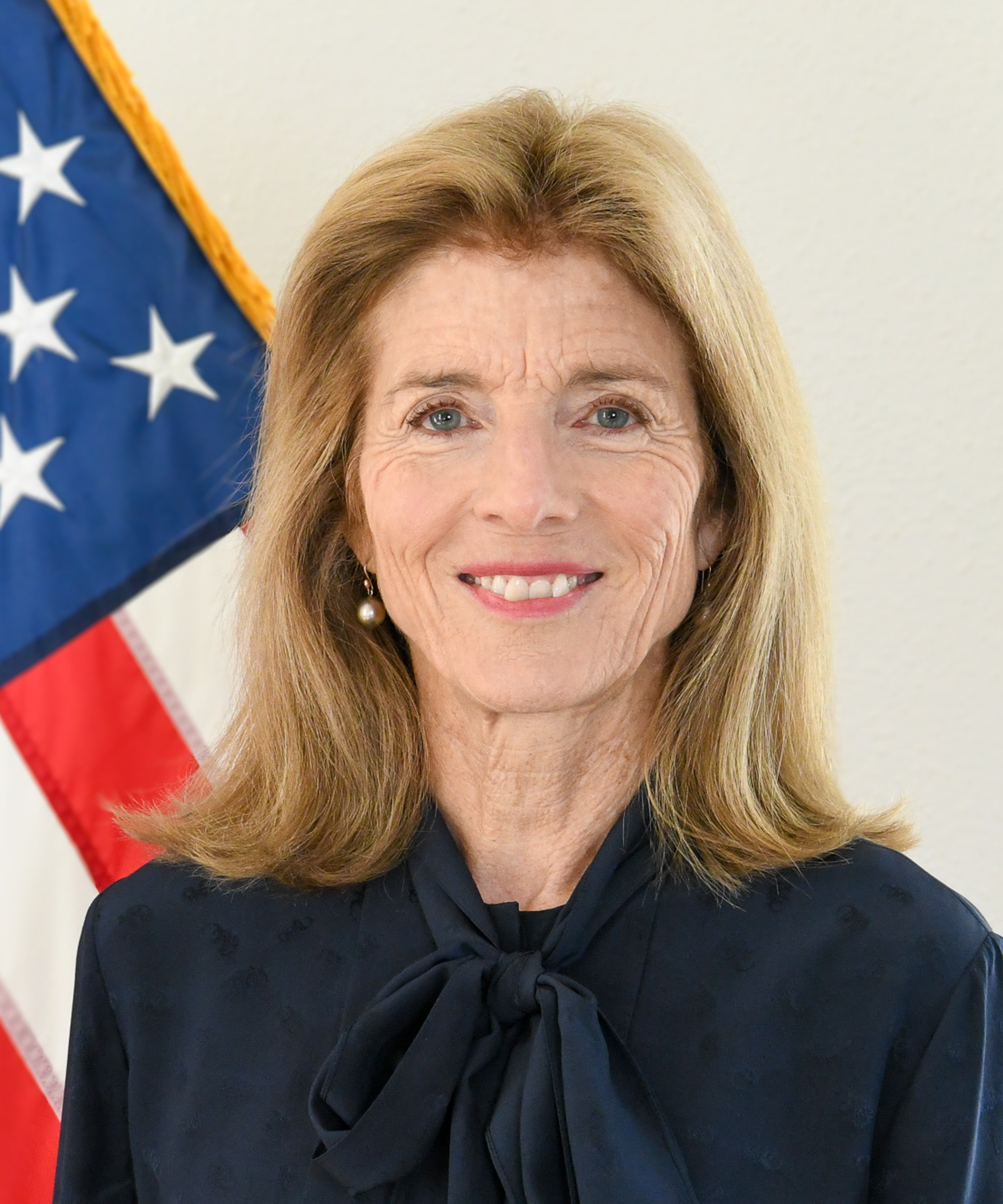
Caroline Kennedy

- November 1 – Peter Ostrum, American actor and veterinarian
- November 3 – Dolph Lundgren, Swedish actor and martial artist
- November 4
  - Tony Abbott, 28th Prime Minister of Australia
  - Aleksandr Tkachyov, Soviet gymnast
- November 5 – Jon-Erik Hexum, American actor (d. 1984)
- November 6
  - Cam Clarke, American voice actor and singer
  - Ciro Gomes, Brazilian lawyer and politician
  - Klaus Kleinfeld, German business executive
  - Lori Singer, American actress and musician
- November 7 – Christopher Knight, American actor
- November 9 – Magalvi Estaba, Venezuelan politician
- November 10 – George Lowe, American voice actor and comedian
- November 11
  - Vince DiCola, American composer
  - Ana Pastor, Spanish politician
- November 12 – Cécilia Attias, wife of French Prime Minister Nicolas Sarkozy
- November 13
  - Greg Abbott, American attorney and politician
  - Roger Ingram, American jazz musician, author, educator, trumpet designer
- November 14 – Gregg Burge, American tap dancer and choreographer (d. 1998)
- November 15 – Kevin Eubanks, American jazz guitarist
- November 18 – Olivia Heussler, Swiss photojournalist
- November 19
  - Ofra Haza, Israeli singer (d. 2000)
  - Tom Virtue, American actor
- November 20
  - Stefan Bellof, German racing driver (d. 1985)
  - John Eriksen, Danish footballer (d. 2002)
  - Goodluck Jonathan, 14th President of Nigeria
  - Sophie Lorain, Canadian actress, director and producer
- November 22
  - Don Newman, American basketball coach and player (d. 2018)
  - Alan Stern, principal investigator of NASA's New Horizons mission to Pluto
- November 23 – William Kaelin Jr., American cellular biologist, Nobel Prize laureate
- November 24 – Denise Crosby, American screen actress
- November 26
  - Kevin Kamenetz, American politician (d. 2018)
  - Matthias Reim, German singer-songwriter
- November 27
  - Kenny Acheson, Irish race car driver
  - Edda Heiðrún Backman, Icelandic actress, singer, director and artist (d. 2016)
  - Caroline Kennedy, American author, attorney and daughter of 35th President John F. Kennedy
- November 30 – Colin Mochrie, Scottish-born Canadian comedian

=== December ===
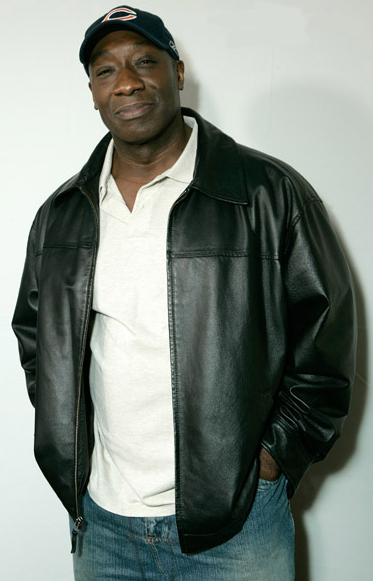
Michael Clarke Duncan

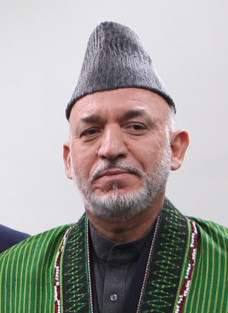
Hamid Karzai

- December 1
  - Tjahjo Kumolo, Indonesian politician (d. 2022)
  - Vesta Williams, American singer-songwriter (d. 2011)
- December 3 – Maxim Korobov, Russian businessman and politician
- December 4 – Eric S. Raymond, American open source software advocate
- December 6
  - Thomas Brinkman, American politician
  - Andrew Cuomo, American politician
- December 7 – Tijjani Muhammad-Bande, Nigerian career-diplomat, President of the United Nations General Assembly (2019)
- December 9
  - José Luis Gil, Spanish actor and voice actor
  - Peter O'Mara, Australian jazz guitarist and composer
  - Donny Osmond, American singer and actor (The Osmonds)
- December 10
  - Michael Clarke Duncan, American actor (d. 2012)
  - Paul Hardcastle, English musician
  - José Mário Vaz, former President of Guinea-Bissau
- December 12 – Sheila E., American percussionist, singer, author, and actress
- December 13 – Steve Buscemi, American actor
- December 15 – Laura Molina, American artist, musician and actress
- December 16 – Nikolaos Michaloliakos, Greek politician, founder and leader of Golden Dawn, a neo-nazi party
- December 17 – Doug Parker, Canadian voice actor and voice director
- December 19
  - Kevin McHale, American basketball player
  - Tracy Pew, Australian musician (d. 1986)
- December 20
  - Billy Bragg, British singer
  - Joyce Hyser, American actress
  - Anna Vissi, Greek singer
- December 21
  - Tom Henke, American baseball player
  - Ray Romano, American actor and comedian
- December 24 – Hamid Karzai, President of Afghanistan
- December 25 – Shane MacGowan, English-born Irish Celtic punk singer-songwriter (The Pogues) (died 2023)
- December 29 – Oliver Hirschbiegel, German film director
- December 30
  - Matt Lauer, American newscaster
  - Joanna Pacuła, Polish actress

== Deaths ==
=== January ===
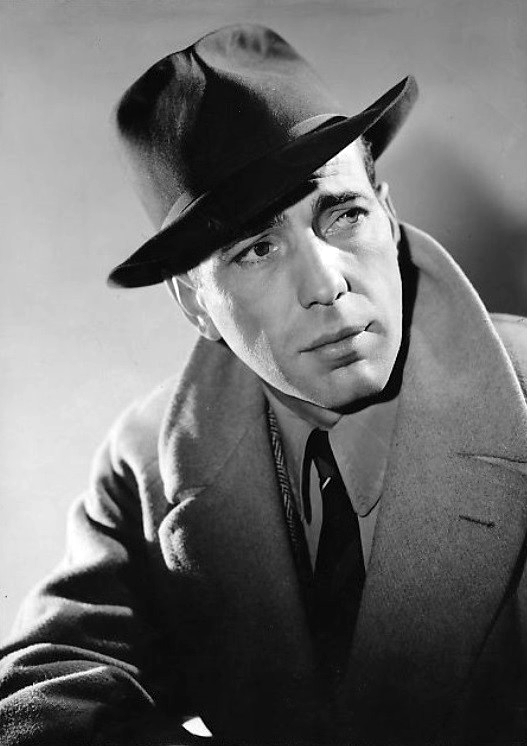
Humphrey Bogart

- January 4 – Theodor Körner, Austrian statesman, 5th President of Austria (b. 1873)
- January 10 – Gabriela Mistral, Chilean writer, Nobel Prize laureate (b. 1889)
- January 14 – Humphrey Bogart, American actor (b. 1899)
- January 16
  - Alexander Cambridge, 1st Earl of Athlone, English army officer and colonial administrator (b. 1874)
  - Arturo Toscanini, Italian conductor (b. 1867)
- January 20 – James Brendan Connolly, American Olympic athlete (b. 1868)
- January 26
  - Helene Costello, American actress (b. 1906)
  - William Eythe, American actor (b. 1918)
  - José Linhares, Brazilian lawyer, 15th President of Brazil (b. 1886)
  - Mamoru Shigemitsu, Japanese diplomat and politician (b. 1887)

=== February ===
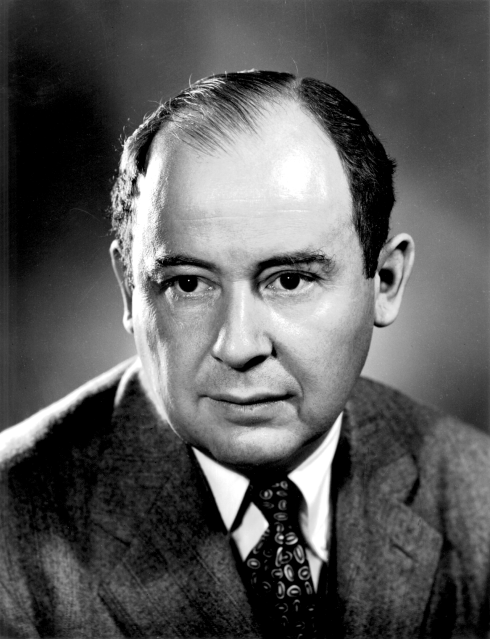
John von Neumann

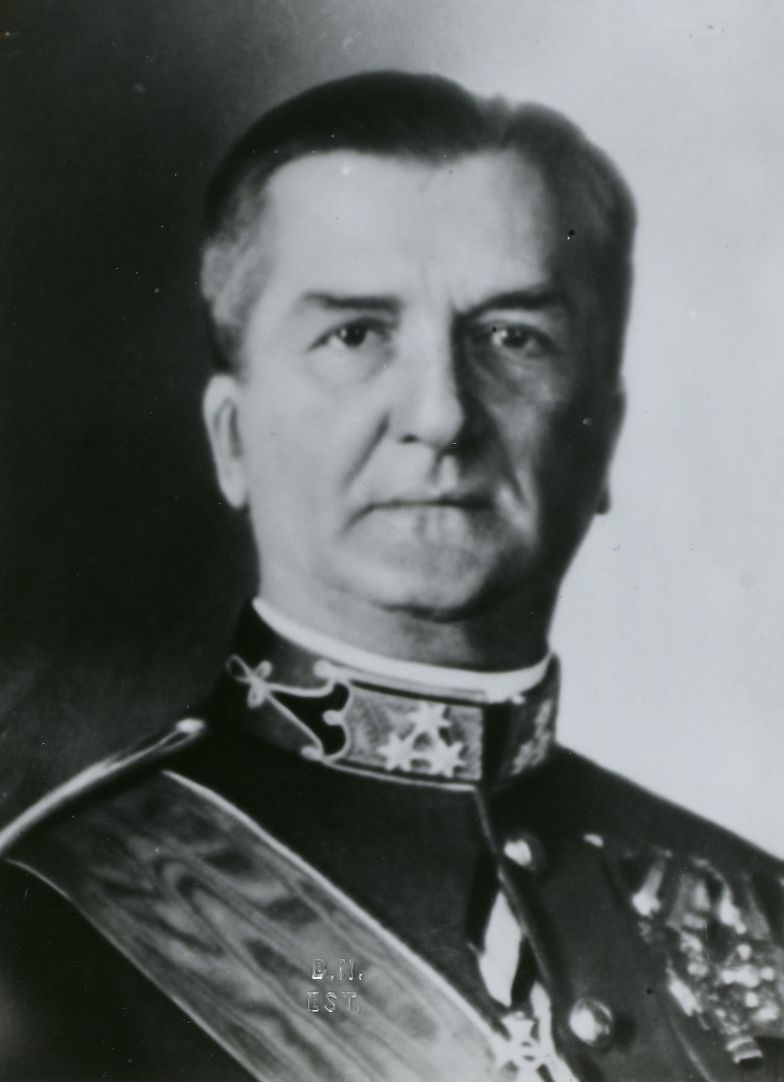
Miklós Horthy

- February 1 – Friedrich Paulus, German field marshal (b. 1890)
- February 2 – Julia Morgan, American architect (b. 1872)
- February 4 – Miguel Covarrubias, Mexican painter (b. 1904)
- February 8
  - Walther Bothe, German physicist, Nobel Prize laureate (b. 1891)
  - John von Neumann, Hungarian-born American mathematician (b. 1903)
- February 9 – Miklós Horthy, Austro-Hungarian admiral and regent of the Kingdom of Hungary (b. 1868)
- February 10 – Laura Ingalls Wilder, American author (b. 1867)
- February 16
  - Josef Hofmann, Polish-born pianist and composer (b. 1876)
  - Sir John Townsend, Irish mathematical physicist (b. 1868)
- February 18
  - Dedan Kimathi, Kenyan rebel leader, executed (b. 1920)
  - Henry Norris Russell, American astronomer (b. 1877)
- February 19 – Märta Torén, Swedish actress (b. 1925)
- February 20 – Sadri Maksudi Arsal, Turkish politician and academic (b. 1878)
- February 25 – Bugs Moran, American gangster (b. 1893)

=== March ===
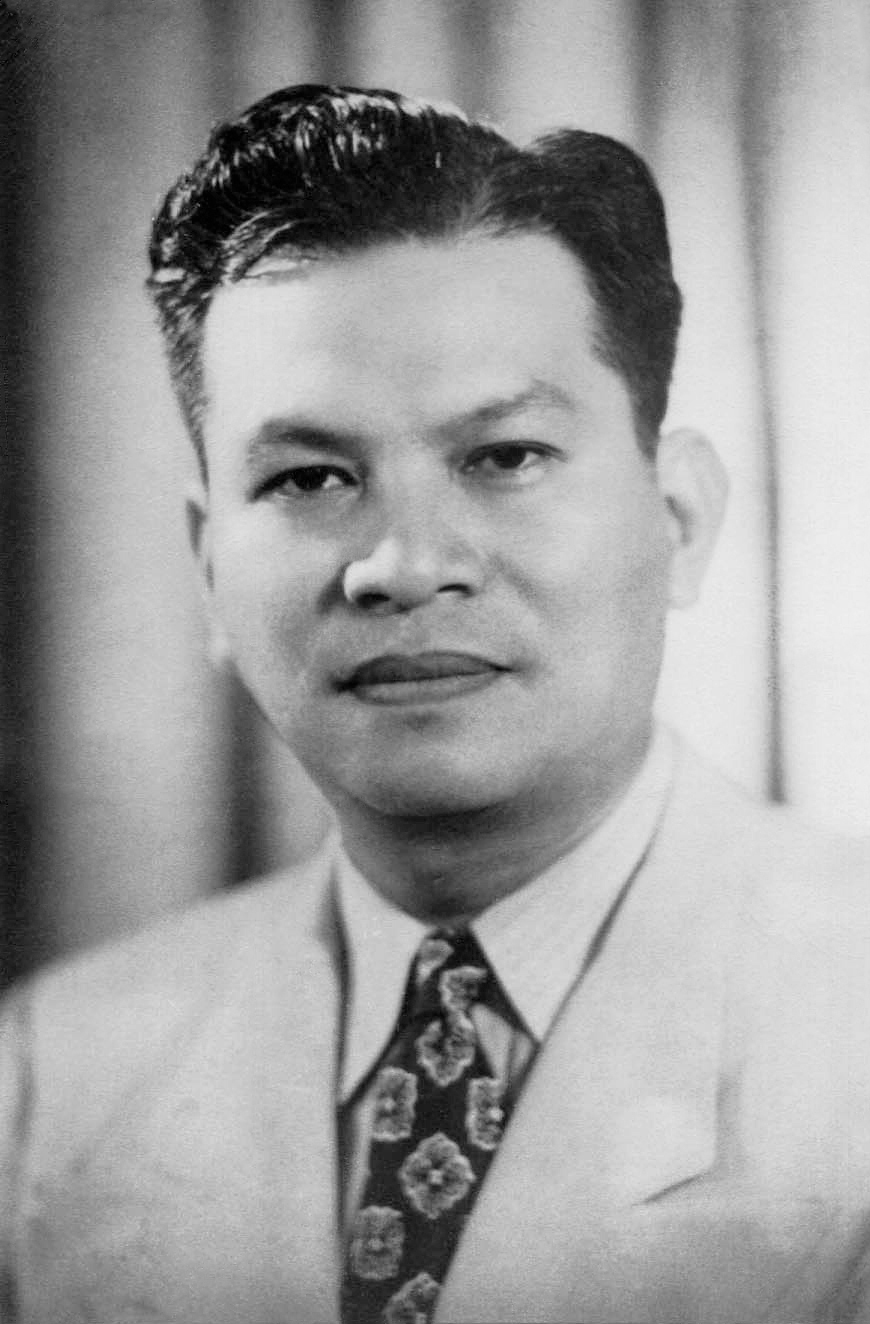
Ramon Magsaysay

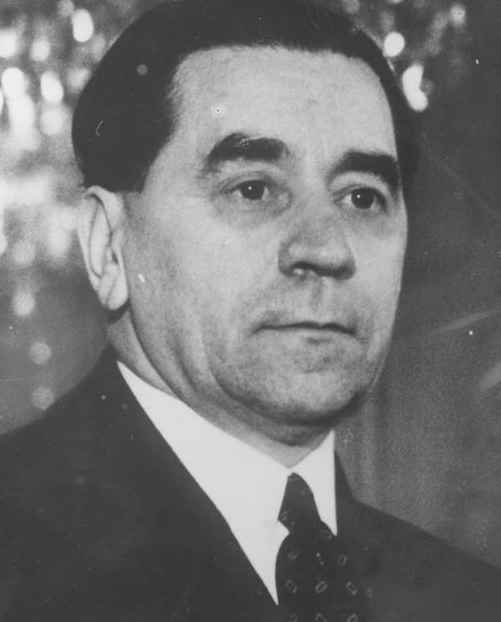
Gheorghe Tătărescu

- March 4 – Larbi Ben M'hidi, Algerian revolutionary leader (executed in Paul Aussaresses custody) (b. 1923)
- March 5 – William Cameron Menzies, American film production designer (b. 1896)
- March 6 – Sir Alexander Godley, British general (b. 1867)
- March 7 – Wyndham Lewis, English painter (b. 1882)
- March 8
  - János Esterházy, Hungarian politician in Czechoslovakia (b. 1901)
  - Othmar Schoeck, Swiss composer (b. 1886)
- March 11 – Richard E. Byrd, American explorer (b. 1888)
- March 12 – Josephine Hull, American actress (b. 1877)
- March 14 – Eugenio Castellotti, Italian racing driver (car crash) (b. 1930)
- March 16 – Constantin Brâncuși, Romanian sculptor (b. 1876)
- March 17 – Ramon Magsaysay, 7th President of the Philippines (b. 1907)
- March 26
  - Édouard Herriot, French politician, 66th Prime Minister of France (b. 1872)
  - Max Ophüls, German film director and writer (b. 1902)
- March 28
  - Gheorghe Tătărescu, Romanian politician, 36th Prime Minister of Romania (b. 1886)
  - Jack B. Yeats, Irish artist (b. 1871)
- March 29 – Joyce Cary, Irish author (b. 1888)
- March 31 – Gene Lockhart, Canadian actor (b. 1891)

=== April ===
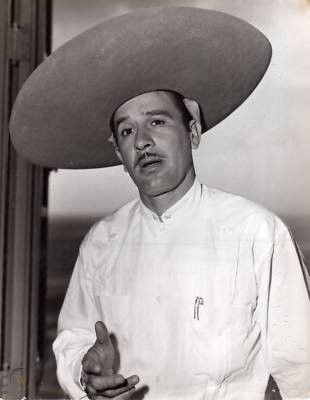
Pedro Infante

- April 3 – Ned Sparks, Canadian character actor (b. 1883)
- April 4 – E. Herbert Norman, Canadian diplomat (b. 1909)
- April 6 – Pierina Morosini, Italian Roman Catholic laywoman, martyr and blessed (b. 1931)
- April 8
  - Dorothy Sebastian, American actress (b. 1903)
  - Pedro Segura y Sáenz, Spanish Roman Catholic archbishop (b. 1880)
- April 15 – Pedro Infante, Mexican actor and singer (b. 1917)
- April 16
  - Pieter van der Hoog, Dutch bacteriologist, dermatologist, and Islamicist (b. 1888)
  - Johnny Torrio, Italian-born American gangster (b. 1882)
- April 23 – Roy Campbell, South African poet (b. 1901)
- April 24 – Elizabeth Hesselblad, Swedish nurse and Roman Catholic saint (b. 1870)
- April 25 – Abdullah bin Jassim Al Thani, Emir of Qatar (b. 1880)
- April 26 – Elinor Fair, American actress (b. 1903)

=== May ===
Joseph McCarthy

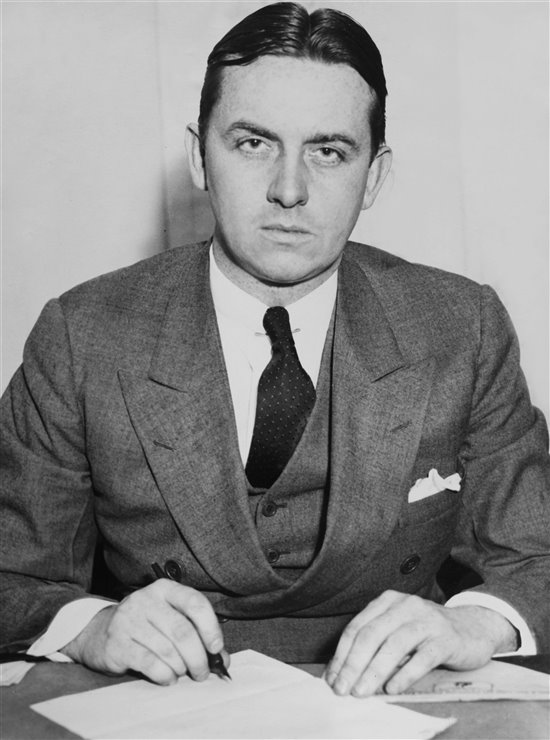
Eliot Ness

- May 1 – Grant Mitchell, American actor (b. 1874)
- May 2 – Joseph McCarthy, American senator (b. 1908)
- May 4 – Katie Johnson, British actress (b. 1878)
- May 7
  - Wilhelm Filchner, German explorer (b. 1877)
  - Zenón Noriega Agüero, Peruvian general, interim President of Peru (b. 1900)
- May 9
  - Ezio Pinza, Italian bass (b. 1892)
  - Heinrich Campendonk, German-Dutch painter and graphic designer (b. 1889)
- May 12 – Erich von Stroheim, Austrian actor and director (b. 1885)
- May 13 – Michael Fekete, Hungarian-born Israeli mathematician (b. 1886)
- May 14 – Marie Vassilieff, Soviet artist (b. 1884)
- May 16 – Eliot Ness, American Prohibition agent (b. 1903)
- May 17 – Francesco Balilla Pratella, Italian composer (b. 1880)
- May 20 – Gilbert Murray, Australian-British classical scholar and intellectual (b. 1866)
- May 21 – Aleksandr Vertinsky, Russian singer and actor (b. 1889)
- May 29 – James Whale, English film director (b. 1889)
- May 31 – Leopold Staff, Polish poet (b. 1878)

=== June ===
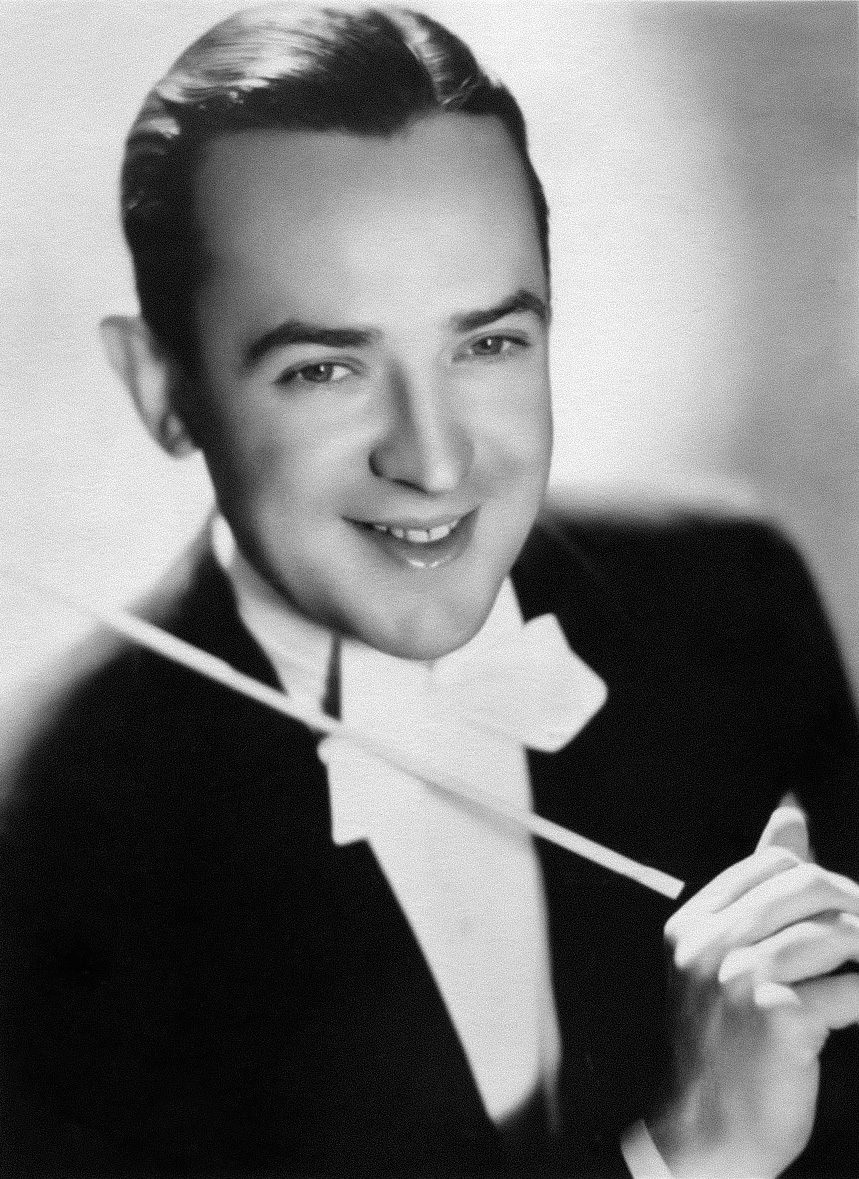
Jimmy Dorsey

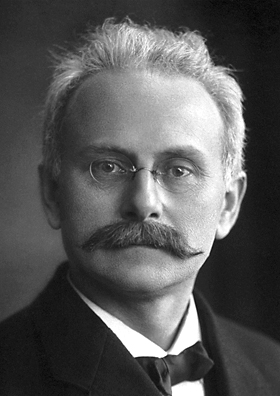
Johannes Stark

- June 1
  - Luisa Casati, Italian patron of the arts (b. 1881)
  - Russell Hicks, American actor (b. 1895)
- June 6 – Kulyash Baiseitova, Soviet composer (b. 1912)
- June 12 – Jimmy Dorsey, American jazz musician (b. 1904)
- June 13 – Irving Baxter, American athlete (b. 1876)
- June 15 – Princess Norina Matchabelli, Italian perfumier (b. 1881)
- June 17
  - Dorothy Richardson, English feminist writer (b. 1873)
  - Augusto Samuel Boyd, 20th President of Panama (b. 1879)
- June 21 – Johannes Stark, German physicist, Nobel Prize laureate (b. 1874)
- June 23 – Ignatius Aphrem I Barsoum, Syrian patriarch (b. 1887)
- June 24 – František Kupka, Czech painter and graphic artist (b. 1871)
- June 26
  - Alfred Döblin, German writer (b. 1878)
  - Malcolm Lowry, English poet and novelist (b. 1909)
- June 27
  - Hermann Buhl, Austrian mountaineer (b. 1924)
  - Vivienne de Watteville, British travel writer and adventurer (b. 1900)

=== July ===
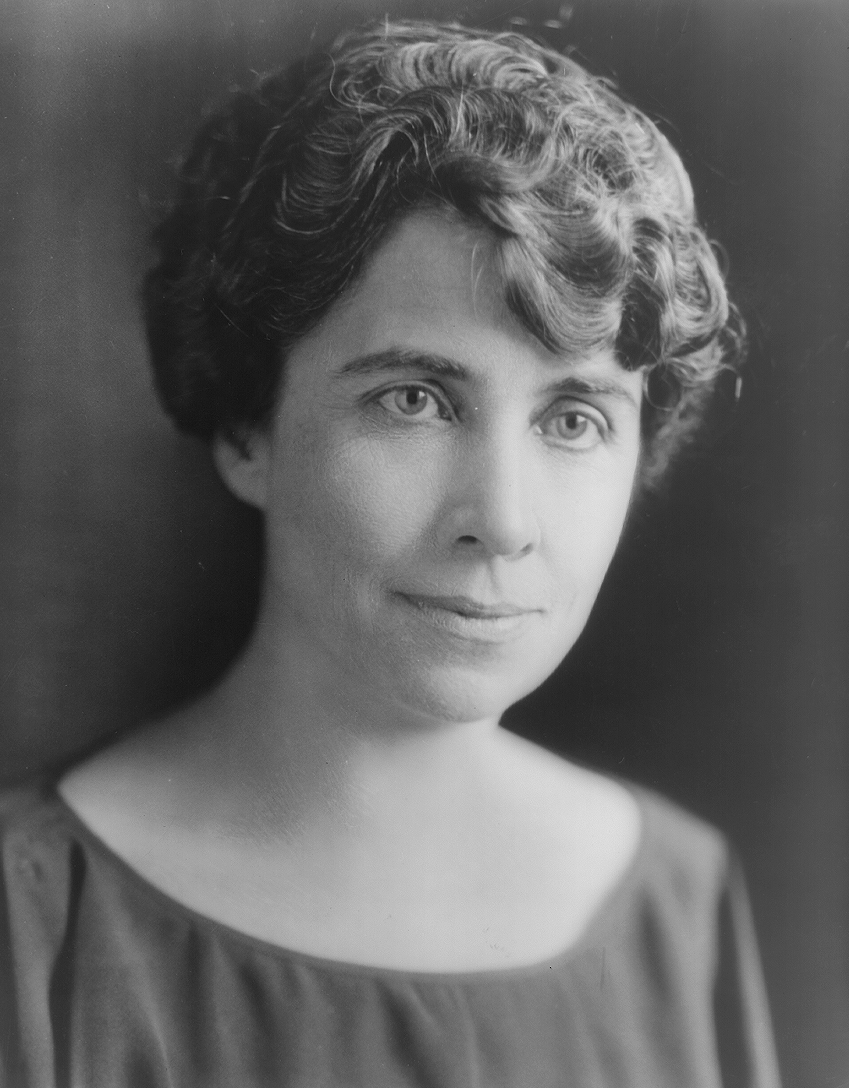
Grace Coolidge

- July 3 – Judy Tyler, American actress (b. 1932)
- July 8 – Grace Coolidge, First Lady of the United States (b. 1879)
- July 10 – Sholem Asch, Polish-Jewish novelist, dramatist and essayist (b. 1880)
- July 11 – Aga Khan III, 48th Nizari Imam (b. 1877)
- July 15
  - George Cleveland, Canadian actor (b. 1885)
  - James M. Cox, Democratic candidate for President of the United States in the election of 1920 (b. 1870)
- July 23 – Giuseppe Tomasi di Lampedusa, Sicilian writer (b. 1896)
- July 24
  - Metodija Andonov-Čento, Macedonian statesman (b. 1902)
  - Sacha Guitry, Russian-born French playwright, actor and director (b. 1885)
- July 26 – Carlos Castillo Armas, Guatemalan military officer and politician, 28th President of Guatemala (b. 1914)
- July 28
  - Edith Abbott, American social worker, educator and author (b. 1876)
  - Mike O'Dowd, American boxer (d. 1895)
- July 31 – Solanus Casey, beatified American priest (b. 1870)

=== August ===
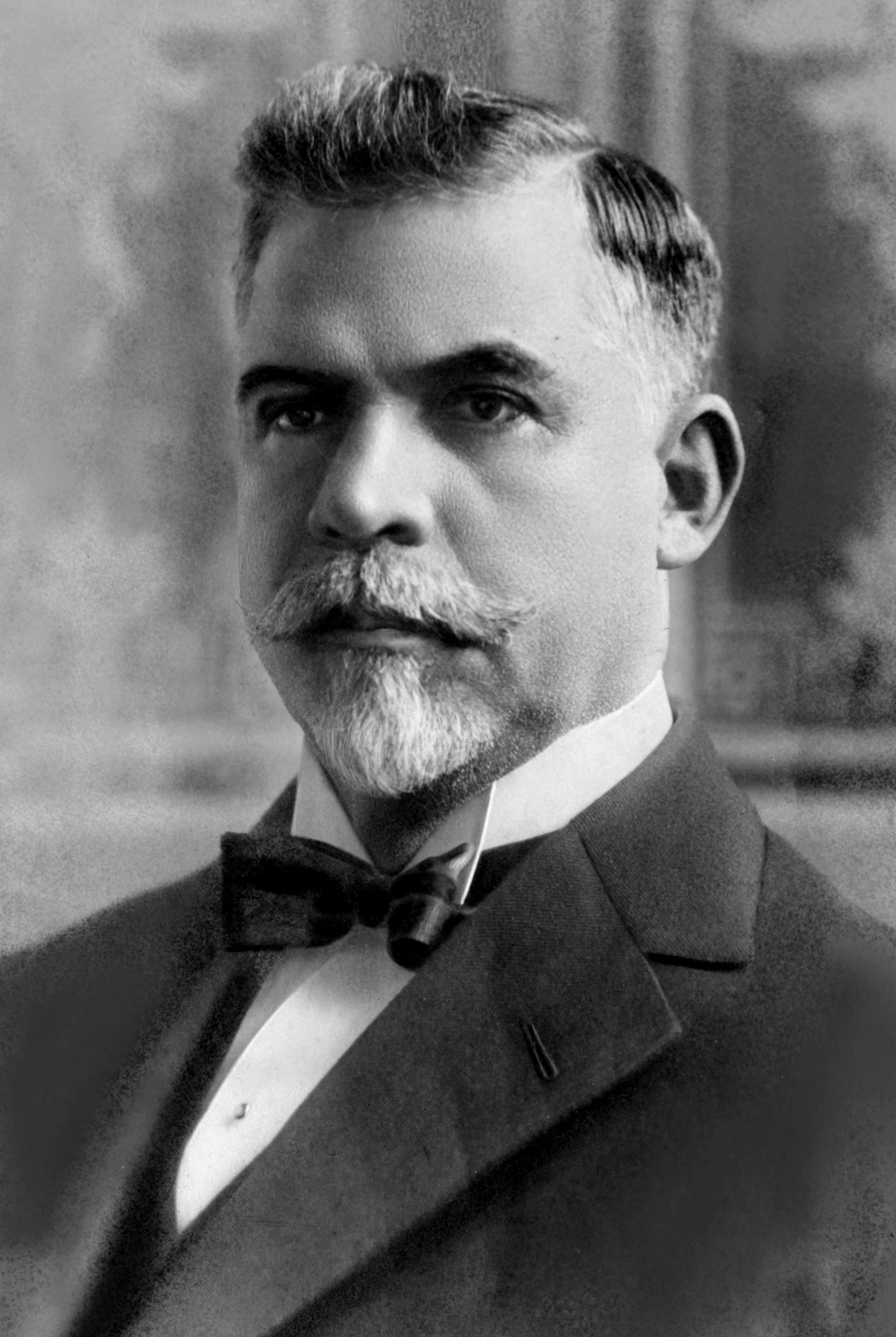
Washington Luís

- August 3 – Devdas Gandhi, youngest son of Mahatma Gandhi (b. 1900)
- August 4 – Washington Luís, 13th President of Brazil (b. 1869)
- August 5 – Heinrich Otto Wieland, German chemist, Nobel Prize laureate (b. 1877)
- August 7 – Oliver Hardy, American actor (b. 1892)
- August 10 – Leo Bagrow, Russian-born historian of cartography (b. 1881)
- August 11 – Rudolf Weigl, Polish biologist (b. 1883)
- August 16 – Irving Langmuir, American chemist, Nobel Prize laureate (b. 1881)
- August 19 – David Bomberg, British Vorticist painter (b. 1890)
- August 20 – Julio Lozano Díaz, President of Honduras (b. 1885)
- August 21
  - Nels Stewart, Canadian ice hockey player (b. 1899)
  - Harald Sverdrup, Norwegian oceanographer (b. 1888)
- August 23 – Eugène Schueller, French chemist and entrepreneur (b. 1881)
- August 30 – Harold Gatty, Australian aviator (b. 1903)

=== September ===
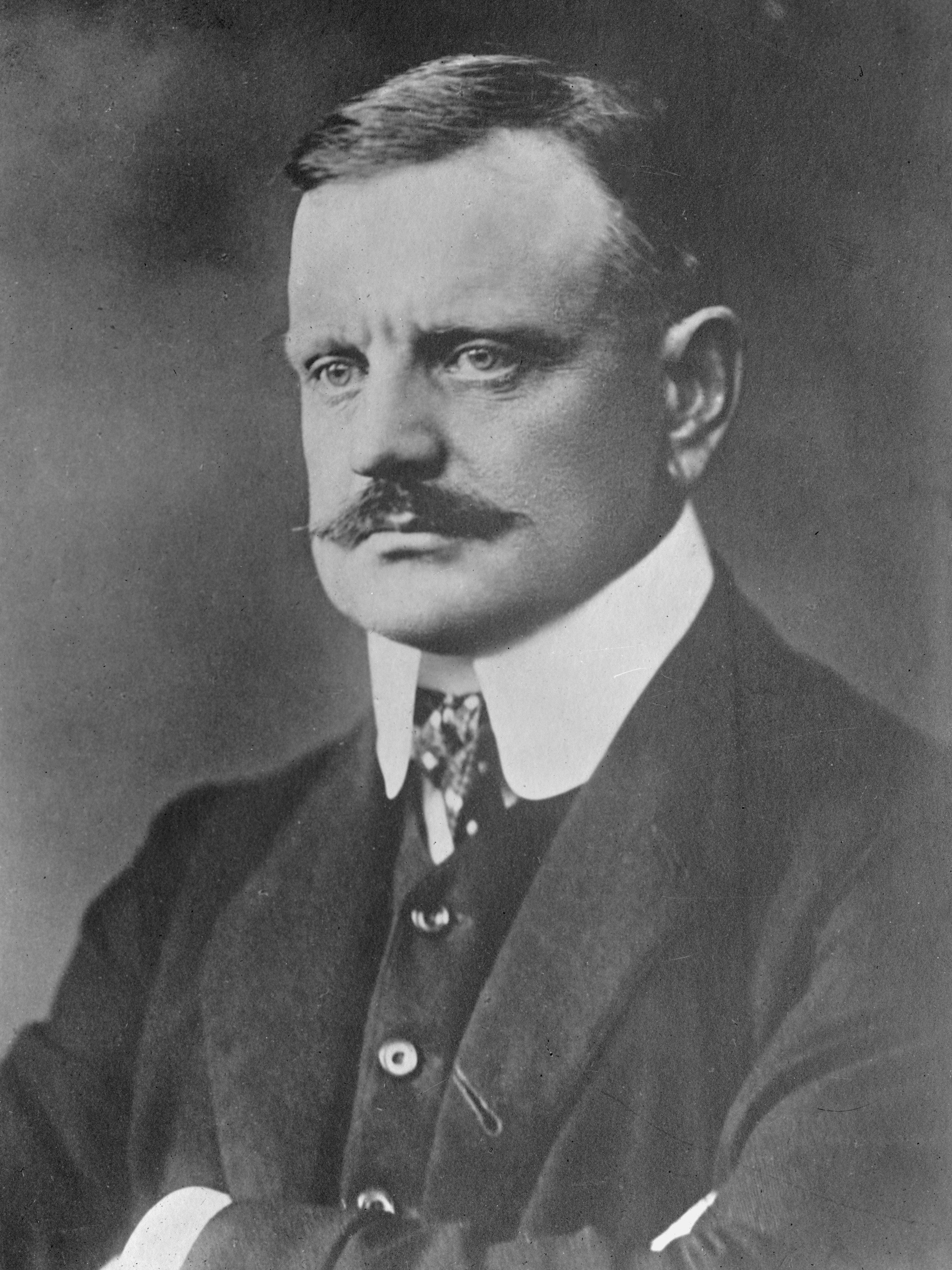
Jean Sibelius

- September 1 – Dennis Brain, English French horn player (b. 1921)
- September 16 – Qi Baishi, Chinese painter (b. 1864)
- September 20 – Jean Sibelius, Finnish composer (b. 1865)
- September 21 – King Haakon VII of Norway (b. 1872)
- September 22 – Toyoda Soemu, Japanese admiral (b. 1885)

=== October ===
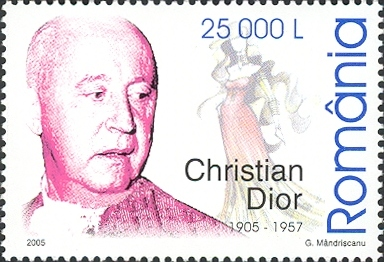
Christian Dior

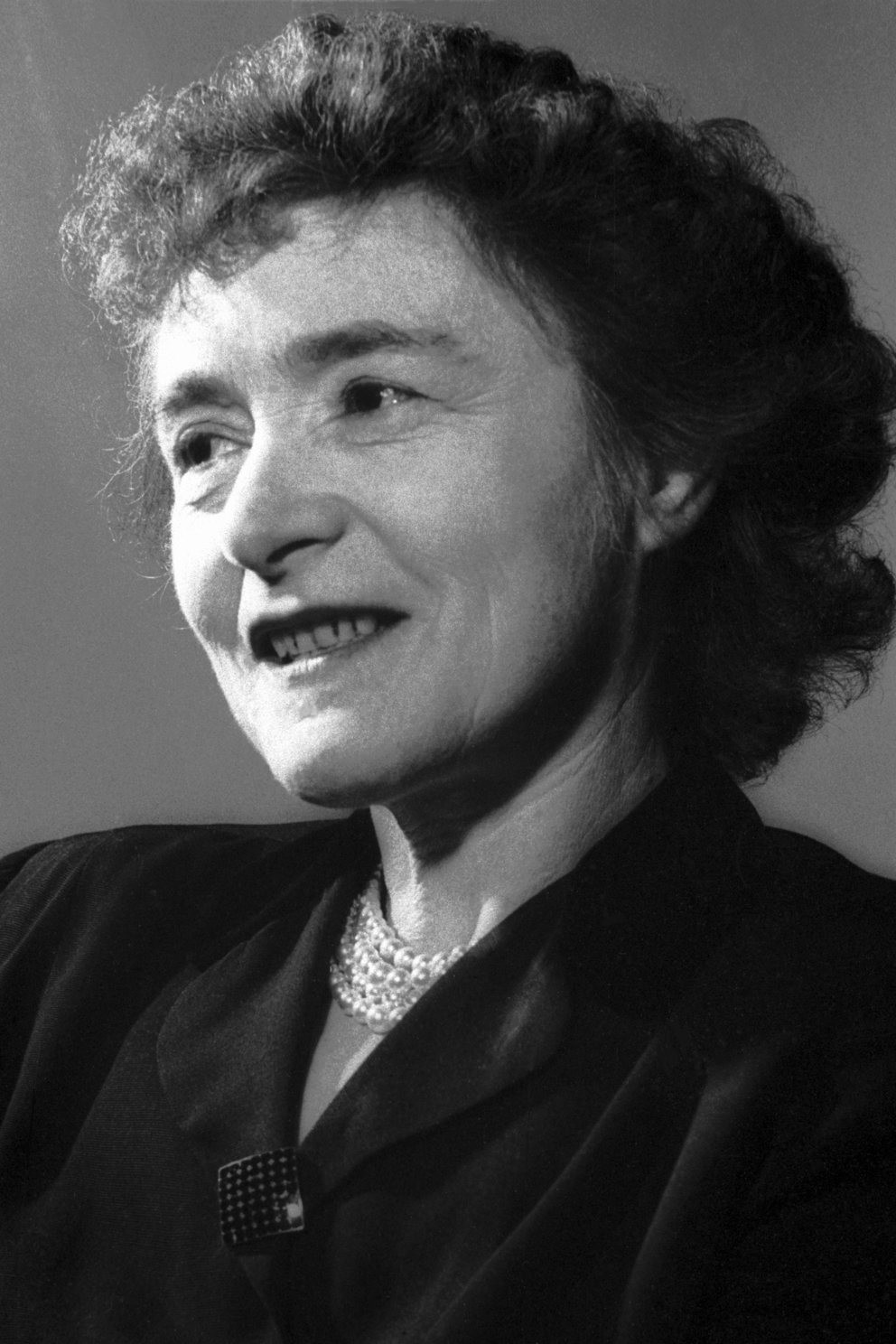
Gerty Cori

- October 3 – Lőrinc Szabó, Hungarian poet (b. 1900)
- October 4 – Pierneef, South African artist (b. 1886)
- October 8 – Hassiba Ben Bouali, Algerian militant (b. 1938)
- October 13 – Erich Auerbach, German philologist (b. 1892)
- October 19 – V. Gordon Childe, Australian archaeologist (b. 1892)
- October 20 – Jack Buchanan, British actor (b. 1891)
- October 23 – Frederick Burton, American actor (b. 1871)
- October 24 – Christian Dior, French fashion designer (b. 1905)
- October 25
  - Albert Anastasia, American gangster (b. 1902)
  - Lord Dunsany, Irish author (b. 1878)
- October 26
  - Gerty Cori, Austrian-born biochemist, recipient of the Nobel Prize in Physiology or Medicine (b. 1896)
  - Nikos Kazantzakis, Greek writer (b. 1883)
- October 27 – Giovanni Battista Caproni, Italian aeronautical, civil and electrical engineer, aircraft designer and industrialist (b. 1886)
- October 29
  - José Patricio Guggiari, Paraguayan politician, 32nd President of Paraguay (b. 1884)
  - Louis B. Mayer, American film studio mogul, former head of Metro-Goldwyn-Mayer (MGM) (b. 1885)

=== November ===
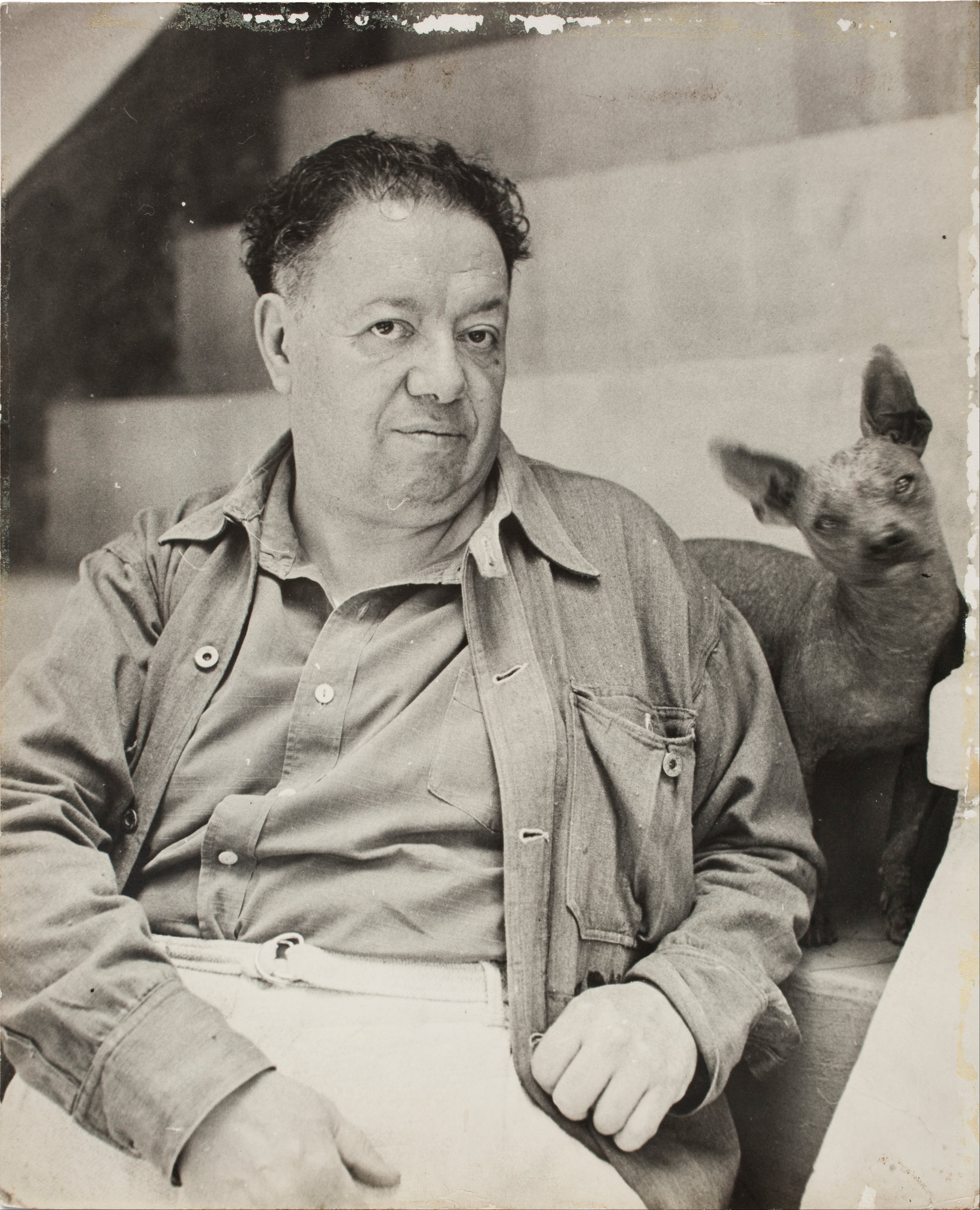
Diego Rivera

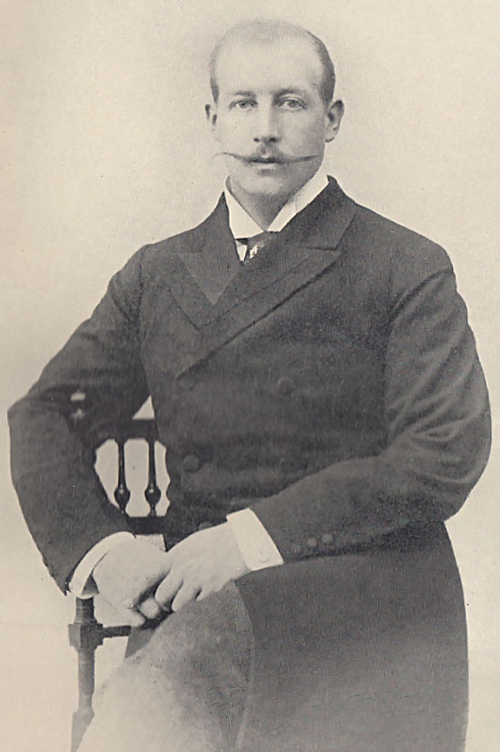
Prince George of Greece and Denmark

- November 2 – Ted Meredith, American Olympic athlete (b. 1891)
- November 3
  - Charles Brabin, American director and screenwriter (b. 1882)
  - Laika, Soviet space dog (b. c. 1954)
  - Wilhelm Reich, Austrian psychoanalyst (b. 1897)
- November 4
  - Joseph Canteloube, French composer and singer (b. 1879)
  - Shoghi Effendi, Bahá'í leader (b. 1897)
  - Grigore Preoteasa, Romanian activist (b. 1915)
- November 7 – Hasui Kawase, Japanese painter and printmaker (b. 1883)
- November 11 – Masao Maruyama, Japanese general (b. 1889)
- November 13 – Antonín Zápotocký, 6th President and 15th Prime Minister of Czechoslovakia (b. 1884)
- November 15 – Andrzej Bursa, Polish poet (b. 1932)
- November 17 – Cora Witherspoon, American actress (b. 1890)
- November 18 – Rudolf Diels, German Nazi civil servant and Gestapo chief (b. 1900)
- November 24
  - Prince George of Greece and Denmark, high commissioner of the Cretan State (b. 1869)
  - Diego Rivera, Mexican painter (b. 1886)
- November 25 – William V. Pratt, American admiral (b. 1869)
- November 26
  - Billy Bevan, Australian actor (b. 1887)
  - Petros Voulgaris, Prime Minister of Greece (b. 1884)
- November 29 – Erich Wolfgang Korngold, Austrian composer (b. 1897)
- November 30 – Beniamino Gigli, Italian tenor (b. 1890)

=== December ===
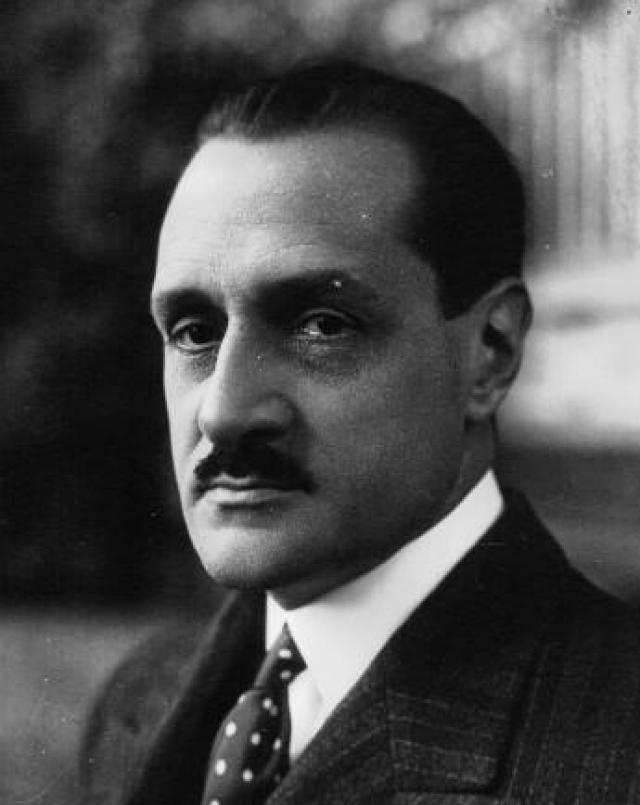
Robert Esnault-Pelterie

- December 2 – Harrison Ford, American silent film actor (b. 1884)
- December 4 – Sir John Lavarack, Australian general, Governor of Queensland (b. 1885)
- December 6 – Robert Esnault-Pelterie, French aircraft designer and pioneer rocket theorist (b. 1881)
- December 10
  - Maurice McLoughlin, American tennis champion (b. 1890)
  - Napoleon Zervas, Greek World War II Resistance leader (b. 1891)
- December 11 – Musidora, French actress (b. 1889)
- December 15 – Alfonso Bedoya, Mexican actor (b. 1904)
- December 17 – Dorothy L. Sayers, British crime writer, poet, playwright and essayist (b. 1893)
- December 21 – Eric Coates, English composer (b. 1886)
- December 24 – Norma Talmadge, American actress (b. 1894)
- December 25 – Charles Pathé, French film pioneer (b. 1863)
- December 31 – Óscar Domínguez, Spanish painter (b. 1906)

== Nobel Prizes ==

- Physics – Chen-Ning Yang, Tsung-Dao Lee
- Chemistry – Lord Alexander R. Todd
- Physiology or Medicine – Daniel Bovet
- Literature – Albert Camus
- Peace – Lester Bowles Pearson
