= Dutch Treat =

1987 film directed by Boaz Davidson

- Directed by: Boaz Davidson
- Written by: David Landsberg; Lorin Dreyfuss
- Produced by: Yoram Globus; Menahem Golan
- Starring: David Landsberg; Lorin Dreyfuss
- Production company: The Cannon Group
- Release date: 1987 (USA)
- Running time: 94 minutes
- Country: United States
- Language: English

Dutch Treat is a 1987 action comedy film co-starring and written by David Landsberg and Lorin Dreyfuss for The Cannon Group.

The film focuses on two American knife throwers. In Amsterdam, they meet a talented female band, and convince its members that they are working for a record company. The Americans return to Los Angeles, where they are visited by the band. The duo try to help the band secure an actual contract with the record company.

== Plot ==
Jerry Morgan appears in the court. He has to answer for more than 250 parking violations that were actually committed by his friend Norm with Jerry’s car. On Norm's advice Jerry pleads guilty to receive a minor penalty, but now he has to go to jail for several weeks. Soon after his release, Jerry learns that, in the meantime, Norm has sublet his apartment and that his girlfriend has dumped him.

As the two are short of money, Norm has the idea to hire a ship to Holland and to perform as knife throwers. Things go terribly wrong and they kill two of the ship’s servants. Therefore, they are taken into police custody when arriving in Amsterdam, where they are ordered to return to America on a cargo ship three days later. They have some time to visit the city, where they meet a talented female band, the Dolly Dots. Norm poses as an employee of Jerry, whom he introduces as Lou Winters, being the boss of Capitol Records. They offer the women that in case they ever visit Los Angeles, they will be welcome anytime. They attend another performance of the band in the evening, which results in a brawl, all ending up in police custody. The American attaché in charge wants to get rid of the two Americans immediately. He chauffeurs them personally to a small airport and puts them into a shaky, hardly airworthy plane. The crew, a drunken female pilot and her simple-minded copilot, take them to the United States.

Back in Los Angeles, Jerry and Norm are doing their normal, low-paid jobs. Jerry works in a hotel kitchen and Norm drives a cab around the city. The Dolly Dots actually come to Los Angeles to be managed by Lou Winters. They stay at the same hotel where Jerry works, because Lou Winters is staying there as well. Jerry and Norm manage to play their fake roles credibly in front of the band through various diversionary tactics. They arrange a small gig for the band and the go with them to a hip party.

However, their cover is blown, as the lead singer of the band Dead Meat knows the real Lou Winters. The Dolly Dots are terribly disappointed by the two pretenders, hence, they want to leave Los Angeles for Holland again. Still, Jerry and Norm have a final plan, they want to make sure that the band gets their chance to play an important gig after all. In the evening Dead Meat performs in front of different music producers. Jerry and Norm disguise as roadies and are able to smuggle in the Dolly Dots. They lead helium through hoses to the microphones, so that the voice pitches of Dead Meat are changed. The band is booed off the stage, giving the Dolly Dots their chance to enter the stage and play. Lou Winters is really pleased and decides to sign the band.

== Cast ==
- David Landsberg as Jerry Morgan
- Lorin Dreyfuss as Norm
- Ria Brieffies as Ria
- Angela Groothuizen as Angela
- Patty Zomer as Patty
- Esther Oosterbeek as Ester
- Angéla Kramers as Sjeel
- Ronnie Schell as Lou Winters
- Carol Potter as Betsy Winters
- Lee Shepard as Duke Clark
- Hank Garrett as Vito
- Terry Camilleri as Morris Klavernan

== Production ==
The band Dolly Dots is a real Dutch band that was popular in the Netherlands in the 1970s and 1980s, reaching 11 top ten positions in the Dutch charts. Their album Dutch Treat, the same title as the film, was released in 1986.

== Reception ==
The TV Guide assigned 2 out of 5 stars and resumed "Lots of sight gags, some old, some new, a breakneck pace, and you'll forget it the moment it's over. But while it's on, you'll have a few good chuckles."
