= Angela Groothuizen =

Dutch pop singer

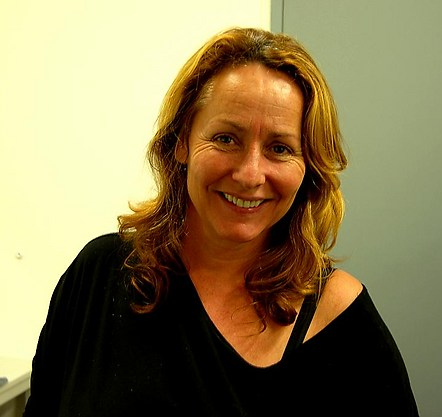
- Groothuizen in 2008

Background information
- Born: 28 September 1959 (age 66); Alkmaar, Netherlands
- Genres: Pop
- Occupations: Singer, television personality
- Years active: 1979–present
- Member of: Dolly Dots

Angela Groothuizen (born 28 September 1959) is a Dutch singer and television personality. Her initial fame came as a member of the Dolly Dots.

== Biography ==
Angela Groothuizen was born in Alkmaar, and has four brothers and sisters. She joined the band Howling Hurricane, of which one of her brothers was a member, and in 1978 they recorded a single, "Dreamt up Rock". That same year she was asked to join a newly formed girl group, and while she was more rock-oriented, she joined, and in 1979 the Dolly Dots were officially launched.

=== Musical career ===
The pop girl group Dolly Dots achieved popularity inside and outside the Netherlands, scoring hits between 1979 and 1988. She is credited also with discovering Roberto Jacketti & The Scooters, a Dutch pop group that scored one big hit ("I Save the Day"), and co-producing their first album in 1984.

After the split of the Dolly Dots in 1988, Groothuizen teamed up with Ruud Mulder, former guitarist of disco/funk-contemporaries Spargo, to record as Angela & the Rude. Additionally she wrote songs for, among others, Kinderen voor Kinderen and Carmen Gomes.

In 1998 the Dots reunited for a one-off concert, which gave rise to a Dolly Dots musical. Love Me Just a Little Bit More played at The Chassé Theatre in Breda and around the Netherlands during 2004, and closed in early 2005. As result of renewed interest in the group after the musical, Warner Bros. Records released a Dolly Dots Greatest Hits compilation of the group as well as a DVD. In May 2007, they sold out Rotterdam Ahoy three nights in a row, and toured the country again in 2008.

In March 2008, Groothuizen released a Dutch-language solo album titled Melk en Honing (Milk and Honey).

In July 2009, fellow-Dolly Dot Ria Brieffies died from lung cancer. At this time Groothuizen and the other Dolly Dots indicated they would never perform together again. However, in 2016 they did come together to perform during a concert of De Toppers, and in 2020 they announced they would do a tour called Sisters on Tour through The Netherlands.

In 2012, she published a children's book, Paula en Khalilo. In April 2013 Groothuizen was awarded the Annie M.G. Schmidt-prijs for her song Vinkeveen, together with author Jan Beuvig and composer Nico Brandsen. In 2015 she recorded with Nico Brandsen 14 Sinterklaas holiday songs. It was accompanied by a sing-a-long book, which sold 175,000 copies, earning it four times platinum status.

=== Television career ===
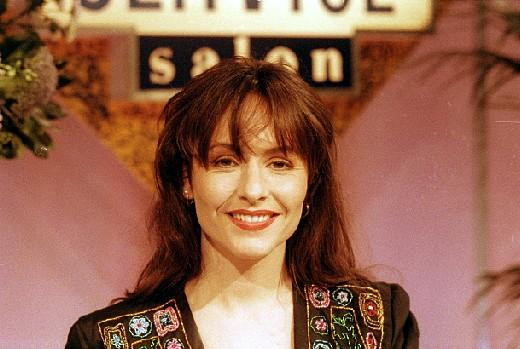
Groothuizen at AVRO Service Salon

Meanwhile, Groothuizen had begun a television career starting with an adaptation of Challenge Anneka for AVRO. Her contract expired in 2005 and was not renewed. Groothuizen has since moved to commercial television as a panel judge on talent show programs, particularly in Dutch X Factor since 2008. From 2010 until 2012 she was one of the judges on the Dutch version of The Voice, The Voice of Holland. In 2019 and 2020 she presented a television show for RTL, Obese, a weight loss program. She is also active in musical theater; with her show Label (which includes, besides songs by Dutch writers, a number of songs by Leonard Cohen) she toured throughout the Netherlands in 2010.

== Discography ==
=== Albums ===
As Angela & the Rude (with Ruud Mulder)

- 1990: Young Souls (reached #46)
- 1992: Walking on Water (reached #71)

As J.A.M. (with Julya Lo'ko and Mildred Douglas)

- 2001: Message in a Bottle

Solo

- 1996: Groothuizen (reached #54)
- 2008: Melk en honing (reached #46)

=== Singles ===
As Angela & the Rude (with Ruud Mulder)

- 1990: "Pressure" (reached #21)
- 1991: "Young Souls" (reached #32)
- 1992: "Back to the Real World" (reached #11)

Solo

- 2010: "Bier en Bitterballen" (reached #81)

As "The Voice of Holland"

- 2011: "One Thousand Voices" (reached #1)
