= George Sallis =

English actor (b. 1971)

George Sallis (born 8 October 1971 in London, England) is an artistic director, theatre producer and actor. He was chairman of the Lion and Unicorn Theatre in Kentish Town, London.

He is the founder and artistic director of the Giant Olive Theatre Company, which was the resident company at the Lion and Unicorn Theatre, 2008-2015.

Works include, 'A Christmas Carol' 2008 and 'Oliver Twist' 2009, 'POP8', 2009, conceived and choreographed by Antonia Franceschi.(Fame, New York City Ballet). 'ZIP: Gun & Knife Crime' 2010 and The GOlive Dance and Performance festival.

== Productions ==
- 2015 JUST DANCE UK Premiere. Produced by AFD/Giant Olive, Theatre Royal Winchester, Choreography by Antonia Franceschi. Dancers: Royal Ballet, Rambert, Ballet Black and Random Dance
- 2015 GOlive Dance and Performance Festival Oxford curated by Donald Hutera
- 2015 GOlive Dance and Performance Festival London curated by Donald Hutera
- 2014 GOlive GOlab curated by Donald Hutera
- 2014 GOlive Extended curated by Donald Hutera
- 2013 GOlive Dance and Performance Festival curated by Donald Hutera
- 2011 I'LL SHOW YOU MINE, Adapted and Performed by Caroline Horton, Produced by Giant Olive Theatre Company
- 2011 BEAUTY IS PRISON-TIME, Written and Performed by Zoe Mavroudi,
- 2011 TOM JONES, Henry Fielding, Directed by Edward Kingham,
- 2011 GO GALA, George Sallis (GO Artistic Director), Antonia Franceschi (GO Artistic Advisor), Mark Baldwin (Artistic Director, Rambert), Richard Alston (Artistic Director, The Place), Martin Lawrence (Choreographer)
- 2010-11 A CHRISTMAS CAROL, Charles Dickens
- 2010 ZIP:Gun & Knife Crime, Produced by George Sallis.
- 2009-10 OLIVER TWIST, Charles Dickens, Adapted by Piers Beckley, Directed by Ray Shell
- 2009-10 SUPERNATURAL, Written by Aline Waites and Jago Turner, Directed by Mykal Rand
- 2009 KITTY AND DAMNATION, Written by Joseph Crilly
- 2009 POP8 with Antonia Franceschi, Zoë Martlew and Ballet Black
- 2008-09 A CHRISTMAS CAROL, Charles Dickens, Adapted by Piers Beckley
- 2008 THE HOSTESS OF THE INN, Carlo Goldoni, Translated & adapted by Katherine Gregor, Directed by Alex Hunter
- 2008 ANTIGONE, Sophocles
- 2008 ADULT ORGASM, Dario Fo and Franka Rame
- 2008 THE WOULD BE GENTLEMAN, Molière, Directed by Alex Hunter
