= Dolly Dots discography =

- Studio albums: 8
- Live albums: 2
- Compilation albums: 11
- Singles: 35
- Video albums: 3
- Box sets: 1

This is the discography of Dutch band Dolly Dots.

== Albums ==
=== Studio albums ===
Title	Album details	Peak chart positions	Certifications
Title	Album details	NL	Certifications
Dolly Dots	Released: December 1979; Label: WEA, Carrere; Formats: LP, MC	21	
American Dream	Released: September 1980; Label: WEA, Carrere; Formats: LP, MC	16	
P.S. We Love You	Released: September 1981; Label: WEA, Polydor; Formats: LP, MC	21	
Take Six	Released: October 1982; Label: WEA, Polydor; Formats: LP, MC	22	
Display	Released: October 1983; Label: WEA; Formats: LP, MC	6	NVPI: Gold
Thirst!	Released: November 1984; Label: Ariola; Formats: LP, MC	11	
Attention	Released: November 1985; Label: Ariola; Formats: LP, MC	16	
Dutch Treat	Released: December 1986; Label: Ariola; Formats: CD, LP, MC	41	
"—" denotes releases that did not chart or were not released in that territory.

=== Live albums ===
Title	Album details	Peak chart positions		Certifications
Title	Album details	NL	BEL (FL)	Certifications
Dolly Dots in Concert – Live In Carré	Released: March 1984; Label: WEA; Formats: LP, MC	4	—	
Reünieconcert Ahoy 2007	Released: June 2007; Label: Warner Music; Formats: CD+DVD	1	64	NVPI: Gold
"—" denotes releases that did not chart or were not released in that territory.

=== Compilation albums ===
Title	Album details	Peak chart positions
Title	Album details	NL
Forever	Released: May 1981; Label: K-tel; Formats: LP, MC	10
The Hits Album	Released: April 1986; Label: K-tel; Formats: LP, MC	32
Latest Hits	Released: May 1988; Label: Ariola; Formats: CD, LP, MC	72
The Very Best Of	Released: 1991; Label: Diamond; Formats: CD	—
Gold – The Very Best Of	Released: July 1993; Label: Warner Music; Formats: CD, MC	31
The Collection	Released: September 1998; Label: BMG; Formats: 2xCD	12
Hit Story	Released: January 2002; Label: Warner; Formats: CD	—
Love Me Just a Little Bit More – Greatest Hits	Released: October 2004; Label: Warner; Formats: CD	—
Give the Girls a Break 84–87	Released: 11 May 2007; Label: Sony BMG; Formats: 2xCD, digital download	—
Their Ultimate Collection	Released: 26 November 2021; Label: Sony Music/Warner; Formats: LP	—
Forever	Released: 28 January 2022; Label: Music on Vinyl; Formats: 2xLP	6
"—" denotes releases that did not chart or were not released in that territory.

=== Box sets ===
Title	Album details
The Complete Album Collection ...And a Little Bit More	Released: 1 October 2021; Label: CD-licious; Formats: 10xCD

=== Video albums ===
Title	Album details	Peak chart positions
Title	Album details	NL
Love Me Just a Little Bit More – Live in Carré and More	Released: October 2004; Label: Warner Music; Formats: DVD	—
We Believe in Love	Released: 21 April 2006; Label: Universal Music; Formats: DVD	—
Reünieconcert Ahoy 2007	Released: June 2007; Label: Warner Music; Formats: CD+DVD	1
"—" denotes releases that did not chart or were not released in that territory.

== Singles ==
Title	Year	Peak chart positions					Album
Title	Year	NL 40	NL 100	BEL (FL)	GER	US Dance	Album
"(Tell It All About) Boys"	1979	9	4	5	—	—	Dolly Dots
"Radio"	1979	11	8	5	—	—	Dolly Dots
"(They Are) Rollerskating"	1979	13	14	12	—	—	Dolly Dots
"We Believe in Love"	1980	10	9	25	—	—	American Dream
"Hela-Di-Ladi-Lo"	1980	6	7	15	37	—	American Dream
"The Dreammachine"	1980	29	14	—	—	—	American Dream
"Leila (The Queen of Sheba)"	1981	9	9	10	73	—	P.S. We Love You
"P.S."	1981	6	12	12	52	49	P.S. We Love You
"S.T.O.P."	1981	6	7	8	71	—	Take Six
"Oh! Oui"	1982	—	—	—	—	—	Non-album single
"Do You Wanna Wanna"	1982	8	7	9	—	—	Take Six
"Crazy Situation" (US-only A-side release)	1982	—	—	—	—	—	P.S. We Love You
"Do Wah Diddy Diddy"	1982	4	2	7	—	—	Take Six
"All the Roses"	1982	9	8	18	—	—	Take Six
"6.4.3.2.9." (Japan-only release)	1982	—	—	—	—	—	Take Six
"Money Lover (Bite the Dust)"	1983	22	28	21	—	—	Display
"Don't Give Up"	1983	14	13	32	—	—	Display
"Love Me Just a Little Bit More (Totally Hooked on You)"	1983	1	2	2	—	—	Display
"She's a Liar"	1984	7	6	9	—	—	Display
"Trick of the Eye"	1984	15	8	—	—	—	Thirst!
"Give the Girl a Break" /	1984	19	10	34	—	—	Thirst!
"Tell Me Why"	1984	—	—	—	—	—	Thirst!
"Where Were You (When I Needed You)"	1985	23	21	—	—	—	Thirst!
"Little Angel" (Japan-only release)	1985	—	—	—	—	—	Thirst!
"Only the Rain"	1985	13	9	—	—	—	Attention
"Unique"	1985	27	27	—	—	—	Attention
"Dreaming of You"	1986	26	30	—	—	—	Attention
"This Girl"	1986	29	25	—	—	—	Dutch Treat
"Hearts Beat Thunder"	1987	25	33	—	—	—	Dutch Treat
"Make It Up to You"	1987	— (Note: "Make It Up to You" didn't enter the Dutch Top 40, but did peak at number 16 on the Tipparade chart.)	55	—	—	—	Dutch Treat
"What a Night"	1987	18	19	24	—	—	Latest Hits
"Love Me Just a Little Bit More" (1993 remix)	1993	—	—	—	—	—	Gold – The Very Best Of
"What a Night" (G-90's-Mix)	1998	—	—	—	—	—	The Collection
"Jij hoort bij mij (Sam's lied)"	2007	—	—	—	—	—	Reünieconcert Ahoy 2007
"Are You with Me"	2021	— (Note: "Are You with Me" didn't enter the Dutch Top 40, but did peak at number 28 on the Tipparade chart.)	—	—	—	—	Forever
"—" denotes releases that did not chart or were not released in that territory.
