= Children of Eden =

1991 stage musical

- 1998 Paper Mill Playhouse Cast Recording
- Music: Stephen Schwartz
- Lyrics: Stephen Schwartz
- Book: John Caird
- Basis: Genesis and a concept by Charles Lisanby
- Productions: 1991 West End; 1997 Paper Mill Playhouse; 2016 Off-West End; 2022 Chicago

Children of Eden is a 1991 musical with music and lyrics by Stephen Schwartz and a book by John Caird. The musical is based on the Book of Genesis, with Act I telling the story of Adam and Eve, and Cain and Abel, while Act II deals with Noah and the flood.

Though commercially the musical has had very little success, it is popular in community and regional theatres worldwide, due to its ability to accommodate a large or small cast, religious subject, and its universal themes of family and love. The show's publisher, Music Theatre International, reports that Children of Eden is one of its top 20 most frequently licensed properties.

== Production history ==
=== Origins ===
Children of Eden was originally written in 1986 as Family Tree for a production by Youth Sing Praise, a religious-oriented high school theatre camp performed at the National Shrine of Our Lady of the Snows in Belleville, Illinois. Stephen Schwartz adapted the script and music of Family Tree into a full-length musical, giving it the title it uses today.

=== Original London Production ===
The original cast production of Children of Eden was developed as a Royal Shakespeare Company (RSC) workshop. The production was directed by John Caird, and starred Ken Page as Father, Richard Lloyd-King as the Snake, Martin Smith as Adam, Shezwae Powell as Eve, Adrian Beaumont as Cain, Kevin Colson as Noah, Earlene Bentley as Mama Noah, Frances Ruffelle as Yonah, Anthony Barclay as Japheth, Craig Pinder as Shem, Ray Shell as Ham, Hiromi Itoh as Aysha and Ruthie Henshall as Aphra. After the RSC's budget was cut, it instead opened at the Prince Edward Theatre in London's West End on January 8, 1991. The show closed on April 6, 1991, due to poor reviews and the negative effects the Persian Gulf War had on tourism worldwide.

Because of the show's poor reviews and quick closing, the idea of a Broadway transfer was abandoned. Schwartz believes the show has not played on Broadway because of the expense required to produce it in an Actor's Equity house, due to the cast of characters.

=== American Premiere ===
Throughout the 1990s, the show received numerous productions at both the amateur and professional levels; it was also reworked and edited, with songs and scenes being added and cut. In 1997, a major production was mounted at the Paper Mill Playhouse in Millburn, New Jersey. The production ran from November 5 to December 14, 1997. In contrast to the London production, the Paper Mill production had actors double roles. A cast recording of this production was produced by Schwartz himself. This revised version, commonly known as the "American version" or "Paper Mill version", is substantially what is currently licensed for production in the United States.

The cast featured William Solo as Father, Adrian Zmed as Adam/Noah, Stephanie Mills as Eve/Mama Noah, Darius de Haas as Cain/Japheth, Hunter Foster as Abel/Ham, and Kelli Rabke as Yonah.

=== Subsequent Productions ===
The New York City premiere of the piece was as the inaugural World AIDS Day Concert presented by Jamie McGonnigal and Kate Shindle for The York Theatre Company. The concert featured Norm Lewis as Father, Julia Murney as Eve/Mama Noah, Jonathan Dokuchitz as Adam/Noah, Darius de Haas as Cain/Japheth, Max von Essen as Abel/Ham, Kate Shindle as Yonah, John Tartaglia as Seth/Shem, Ann Harada as Aysha, and Laura Benanti as the Snake. The concert raised funds for The National AIDS Fund and was presented December 1, 2003, at Riverside Church.

A Gala charity concert adaptation ran for one night only at the Prince of Wales theatre in London on 29 January 2012. The concert was produced to support Crohn's and Colitis UK and featured performers from London's West End theatre community and from UK television.

In 2013 Children of Eden was presented in Melbourne, Australia by award-winning production company Magnormos, as the finale of their Stephen Schwartz Celebration Triptych, which also featured Godspell and Pippin. Composer Stephen Schwartz was in attendance.

A one-night only concert was presented at the John F. Kennedy Center for the Performing Arts in Washington, D.C., on May 19, 2014. The concert featured Ron Bohmer as Father, Charl Brown as Adam/Noah, Ashley Brown as Eve/Mama Noah, Jeremy Jordan as Cain/Japheth, and Rebecca Naomi Jones as Yonah. The production was accompanied by the Kennedy Center Opera House Orchestra and the National Broadway Chorus, and was attended by composer Stephen Schwartz.

In 2015, the show was adapted into a junior version by Lindsay Maron and was presented at the Summit Playhouse in Summit, NJ from July 24-August 2, with preview performances July 17–19. The production was directed and choreographed by Maron with musical direction and musical arrangements by Alex Ratner. The cast included 37 performers from all over the tristate area. Stephen Schwartz and executives from MTI attended the production and the junior version of the show is now available through MTI.

In 2016, Children of Eden marked its 30th anniversary. In celebration of this achievement, Youth Sing Praise, the same religious-oriented high school theatre camp that premiered it in 1986, performed the show at the National Shrine of Our Lady of the Snows in Belleville, Illinois, on June 25, 2016, to a crowd of over 1,000 people.

In 2016, 25 years after its original London production, Children of Eden was revived at the new Union Theatre in Southwark, London.

In 2019, Schwartz announced a planned Chicago production in 2020 and its possible filming. The production was later postponed indefinitely due to COVID-19 and had planned to open in Chicago's Arcada Theatre in 2022. The production was set to feature Norm Lewis, Deborah Cox, David Phelps, America's Got Talent alum Brian Justin Crum, and Kirstin Maldonado of Pentatonix. The production was later put on as a concert on October 15, 2022, at the Cadillac Palace Theatre. The cast featured Randal Keith as Father, David Phelps as Adam/Noah, Michelle Williams as Eve/Mama Noah, Sam Tsui as Cain/Japheth, Chris Graham as Abel/Ham, and Koryn Hawthorne as Yonah. The production will be streamed in April 2026 ahead of a Broadway-aimed production in Chicago.

In 2024, a concert version of the show was performed at Lincoln Center. It starred Norm Lewis as the Father, Auli’i Cravalho as Yonah, Nikki Renée Daniels as Eve/Mama Noah, and Lucas Pastrana as Abel/Ham. Paul Alexander Nolan and Jordan Fisher were originally set to star as Adam/Noah and Cain/Japheth respectively, but were replaced by David Phelps and Donald Webber Jr. Choirs from around the world were invited to perform, including the Blue Springs High School Choir from Blue Springs, Missouri.

=== Recordings ===
The Original London Cast Recording was released on LP and CD, but quickly went out of print. The CD release was marred by manufacturing defects that caused most of the discs to "bronze", and become unplayable. Consequently, a playable copy of the disc is highly prized by musical theatre collectors.

The rarest recording of the show is a concept recording released after changes were made following the 1991 London production. The tracks feature Stephen Schwartz himself playing the piano. The recording was made before the Paper Mill Playhouse production in an effort to review the rewrites and revisions. The album was made available only for a limited time on Stephen Schwartz's website via RealAudio streaming. This recording is considered to be the rarest version of the show that exists. There are only a handful of copies of this recording in existence.

The Paper Mill Playhouse Cast was recorded in 1998. The recording was financed by Stephen Schwartz. It is the only professional recording of the show in its revised state.

== Synopsis ==
=== Act I ===
Much like the story in Book of Genesis, the universe is born out of darkness. Father, with the help of the Storytellers, brings the universe and life into existence, including Father's new children, Adam and Eve ("Let There Be"). Eve finds herself drawn to the Tree of Knowledge, but Father tells her to stay away from "that tree," though he provides no clear reason why ("The Tree of Knowledge"). Father attempts to distract the two with a game where they name all the animals in the garden ("The Naming"). With everything right in the newly created world, Father reflects on parenthood and Adam and Eve fall in love with one another ("Grateful Children", "Father's Day", and "Perfect"). Though her life is perfect, Eve still hungers for something more: knowledge, adventure, and to see what lies beyond the garden ("The Spark of Creation"). Eve meets a snake who tempts her with apples from the forbidden tree and the possibilities that would open up for her if she eats it. ("In Pursuit of Excellence"). She eats the fruit and is awakened to knowledge and possibility. ("The End of a Perfect Day" and "Childhood's End"). Later that night, Eve attempts to trick Adam into eating the apple in several apple-related dishes, but stops him before eats. Eve admits to Adam that she ate of the Tree of Knowledge and the two hide from Father in the garden.

Father, after discovering Eve has eaten the apple, tells her that she must leave the garden as she is no longer innocent. But unlike in the Genesis tale, Adam is made to choose his fate: he can either stay with Father in Eden, or he can eat the fruit and be banished with Eve. Adam, deeply torn by the decision, decides that, even though it means he has to leave the garden he loves with all his heart, he must be with Eve ("A World Without You"). Adam and Eve are driven out of the garden by Father and into the wasteland of the outside world. As the years pass, they build a new life and have two children, Cain and Abel ("The Expulsion" and "The Wasteland"). The family hope that Father will one day bring them home to Eden, praying to him each day and offering sacrifices of their crops.

Adam and Eve, out of fear for their children's safety, have set their glen as a boundary, preventing them from going beyond a nearby waterfall. As the children grow into adulthood, Eve sees the same fire she once had present in her son, Cain ("The Spark of Creation (Reprise 1)"). Cain, much like his mother, longs to see the world beyond the boundaries placed by his parents, while Abel remains devoted to their parents and the idea that Father will one day bring them back to the garden. Cain begs Abel to run away with him, claiming Father doesn't care about them and that the boys should not be stuck with the consequences of their parents' mistakes ("Lost in the Wilderness"). As Abel hesitantly agrees to leave, Father appears. Having never seen Father, the two are shocked. Father shows the two love and affection and promises them their very own wives. Assuming that he has arrived to take them all back to the garden, Abel goes to fetch their parents, but is stopped by Father. It quickly becomes clear that Father has no intention of seeing their parents or taking any of them back to Eden. Cain, further embittered, tells Father and Abel that he is going to leave the glen, finally free from the boundaries and predetermined fate his parents and Father have set for him ("Lost in the Wilderness (Reprise)"). Father tells Abel to keep their visit secret from his parents, but that he will return to them soon.

Adam and Eve, deeply worried for Cain's safety, reminisce on the boy's childhoods and find some comfort in the fact they have created a life and family for themselves outside of Eden ("Close to Home") But this peacefulness is shattered when Cain returns from his journey. He tells the family that he has seemingly found evidence proving the existence of other humans: a ring of giant stones. Cain takes the family to see the stones in the wasteland. While Eve and Abel are just as excited as Cain, Adam, however, becomes distant, cold, and mean, telling the family to return home. After prodding from the Family, Adam admits that he had found the ring of stones many years earlier, and was frightened of the people he found there. He kept this a secret, even from Eve, out of fear of the potential consequences ("A Ring of Stones" and "Clash of the Generations"). Adam's betrayal quickly leads to a family-wide fight, culminating with Cain threatening to leave forever, taking Abel with him and starting a new life. Torn between these choices, Abel, fighting through his heartbreak, decides to stay with his parents. Devastated, Cain begins to leave, but is forcibly stopped by Adam, who slaps him and sends him to the ground. Cain vows that he will kill Adam and the two begin to fight. When Abel intervenes, Cain throws him off and, in his rage, beats Abel to death with a stone ("The Death of Abel"). Cain, leaving the remaining members of his family, tells them that Adam is the one that should be dead. Father, in his anger, burns a mark into Cain's face. Father also decrees that his descendants will bear this mark forever as punishment for the sin of their ancestor. Cain stumbles into the wasteland. ("The Mark of Cain").

Many years after Abel's death and Cain's departure, Eve attempts to speak to Father one last time as she prepares herself for death. She details the lives they lead after the tragedy; the birth of another son, Seth, who has since had children of his own, Adam's grief over the loss of both his sons, and Adam's recent death. Surrounded by her many children and grandchildren, she prays that they may one day regain the garden that was lost. As she dies, Father greets her, allowing her into heaven ("Children of Eden").

=== Act II ===
The storytellers reconvene and continue their story, following the lineage of both Seth and Cain, tracing the descendants all the way down to Noah and his family ("Generations").

Father, after centuries of facing the race of Cain, has created a storm that will wipe them from the face of their Earth. He informs Noah of the impending doom, as Noah's family remain the only who are untainted by Cain's lineage, and commands him to build an ark for refuge. Noah begs Father to reconsider, but Father leaves him with the command and that the ark must be large enough for both his family and two of every animal ("The Gathering Storm").

Noah and his wife, Mama Noah, have three sons, and the eldest two, Shem and Ham, have wives, but his youngest son, Japheth, is unhappy and refuses the wives Noah has tried to obtain for him. At family dinner, he announces the woman he has chosen. Secretly, he has fallen in love with and wishes to marry the servant-girl, Yonah, a descendant of the race of Cain. Japheth tells this to his surprised family ("A Piece of Eight"). However, Noah cannot allow Yonah on the ark, due to her being a part of the race of Cain. As Yonah leaves, embarrassed, and Japheth angrily chases after her, all of the animals, played by the Storytellers, come to the ark so that they can board and be saved from the flood ("The Return of the Animals" and "Noah's Lullaby"). Later, Noah finds Yonah outside and explains that she cannot board the ark, though he wishes she could join them. She reckons with her plight, but knows she will continue to face her problems with an open heart and mind, as she always has before ("Stranger to the Rain"). Japheth finds Yonah and attempts to convince her to sneak on to the ark with him, telling her that he doesn't care about the consequences it may bring, as long as he can be with her. They vow to spend whatever time they have left together and secretly board the ark ("In Whatever Time We Have"), just as Father unleashes his wrath on the earth and the race of Cain ("The Flood").

The rain continues for forty days and forty nights, never ceasing, and tensions on the ark are high. With couples fighting, discussions on how to survive through these desperate conditions, including killing animals on the ark for food, and Noah's discovery that Father no longer speaks to him, the group questions why Father hasn't stopped the storm ("What is He Waiting For?"). Yonah, having stayed undiscovered, releases a dove to find dry land and save the residents of the ark ("Sailor of the Skies"). When the family discovers Yonah, they assume she is the reason why Father's wrath continues. Shem and Ham attempt to throw her overboard to appease him, but Japheth intervenes. This quickly escalates into a fight, directly mirroring the one between Adam and Cain generations ago, with Noah slapping Japheth to the ground. This time, however, Yonah intervenes and steps in between father and son, preventing the same events from playing out. Noah, shocked by the selflessness of one of the race of Cain, becomes unsure as to what he must do now. He sends the family away and attempts to talk to Father. Mama Noah asks him if Father speaks to him anymore, and when Noah answers "No", she advises him: "You must be the father now;" that Noah has to live without God telling him what to do ("The Spark of Creation (Reprise 2)"). Noah and Father both think of the difficulties they have faced in being fathers, but both ultimately come to terms with the fact that if you love something, you must let it go ("The Hardest Part of Love").

Noah calls the family together once more, all of them desperate for guidance and hope ("Words of Doom"). He decides to give Japheth and Yonah his blessing, allowing her to stay on the ark. The family huddles together to spend the time they have left as a happy, loving family ("The Hour of Darkness"). They spot the dove Yonah released, now returning with an olive branch in its beak, signifying nearby land, and the family finally sees the light of the stars return to the sky. The family rejoices ("Ain't It Good?"). Father decides to give humanity the power to control its fate and offers his blessing for all to find their future without his direct influence ("Precious Children"). The family lands and leaves the ark. They make plans to separate, taking various animals to their new homes across the world. As they say their final goodbyes, the family addresses the problems they know the future holds, but vow to face them with love and open eyes. They set off, still with hope that one day they will return home; to Eden ("In the Beginning").

== Musical numbers ==
Act I

- Let There Be – Father, Storytellers
- Perfect (Part 1) – Storytellers, Father, Adam & Eve
- The Tree of Knowledge – Father & Adam
- The Naming – Father, Adam, Eve & Storytellers
- Grateful Children – Adam & Eve
- Father's Day – Father
- Perfect (Part 2) – Storytellers, Father, Adam & Eve
- The Spark of Creation – Eve
- In Pursuit of Excellence – Snake & Eve
- The End of a Perfect Day – Storytellers
- Childhood's End – Storytellers, Father & Eve
- A World Without You – Adam, Father & Eve
- The Expulsion – Father & Storytellers
- The Wasteland – Storytellers
- Wilderness Family – Adam, Young Cain & Young Abel
- The Spark of Creation (Reprise 1) – Eve
- Lost in the Wilderness – Cain & Abel
- Lost in the Wilderness (Reprise) – Cain & Father
- Close to Home – Adam, Eve, Abel, Young Cain & Young Abel
- A Ring of Stones – Adam, Eve, Cain & Abel
- Clash of the Generations – Adam, Eve, Cain & Abel
- The Death of Abel – Eve & Storytellers
- The Mark of Cain – Father & Storytellers
- Children of Eden – Eve & Storytellers

Act II

- Generations – Storytellers
- The Gathering Storm – Noah & Father
- A Piece of Eight – Storytellers, Noah, Mama Noah, Japheth, Yonah, Ham, Shem, Aphra & Aysha
- Blind Obedience – Noah
- The Return of the Animals – Orchestra
- The Naming (Reprise)/Noah's Lullaby – Storytellers & Noah
- Stranger to the Rain – Yonah
- In Whatever Time We Have – Japheth & Yonah
- The Flood – Father & Storytellers
- What is He Waiting For? – Noah, Mama Noah, Ham, Shem, Aphra & Aysha
- Sailor of the Skies – Yonah
- The Spark of Creation (Reprise 2) – Mama Noah
- The Hardest Part of Love – Noah & Father
- Words of Doom – Storytellers
- The Hour of Darkness – Noah, Mama Noah, Japheth, Yonah, Ham, Shem, Aphra & Aysha
- Ain’t it Good? – Mama Noah, Noah, Japheth, Ham, Yonah, Shem, Aphra, Aysha, & Storytellers
- Precious Children – Father
- In the Beginning – Japheth, Yonah, Noah, Mama Noah, Father, Ham, Shem, Aphra, Aysha & Storytellers

== Casts ==
=== Original cast ===
| Character | West End cast (1991) | Paper Mill Playhouse cast (1997) | Off West End cast (2016) | Chicago Concert cast (2022) | Lincoln Center cast (2024) |
|---|---|---|---|---|---|
| Father | Ken Page | William Solo | Joey Dexter | Randal Keith | Norm Lewis |
| Adam | Martin Smith | Adrian Zmed | Stephen Barry | David Phelps | David Phelps |
| Noah | Kevin Colson | Adrian Zmed | Stephen Barry | David Phelps | David Phelps |
| Eve | Shezwae Powell | Stephanie Mills | Natasha O'Brien | Michelle Williams | Nikki Renée Daniels |
| Mama Noah | Earlene Bentley | Stephanie Mills | Natasha O'Brien | Michelle Williams | Nikki Renée Daniels |
| Cain | Adrian Beaumont | Darius de Haas | Guy Woolf | Sam Tsui | Donald Webber Jr. |
| Japheth | Anthony Barclay | Darius de Haas | Guy Woolf | Sam Tsui | Donald Webber Jr. |
| Abel | Shion Abdillah; Ramilles Corbin; Ashley Walters | Hunter Foster | Daniel Miles | Chris Graham | Lucas Pastrana |
| Ham | Ray Shell | Hunter Foster | Daniel Miles | Chris Graham | Lucas Pastrana |
| Yonah | Frances Ruffelle | Kelli Rabke | Nikita Johal | Koryn Hawthorne | Auli’i Cravalho |
| Seth | —N/a | Vincent D'Elia | Kris Marc-Joseph | Darian Goulding | Zelig Williams |
| Shem | Craig Pinder | Vincent D'Elia | Kris Marc-Joseph | Darian Goulding | Zelig Williams |
| Aphra | Ruthie Henshall | Sheetal Gandhi | Susie Chaytow | Donica Lynn | Runako Campbell |
| Aysha | Hiromi Itoh | Emy Baysic | Samantha Giffard | Rhealee Fernandez | Karli Dinardo |
| Young Cain | —N/a | James Anthony Johnson | Guy Woolf | Alex Garcia | |
| Young Abel | —N/a | Barry Cavanagh | Daniel Miles | Rogan Jackson | |
| Snake | Richard Lloyd-King | Emy Baysic; Vincent D'Elia; Sheetal Gandhi; Angela Garrison; Jim Weaver | Gabriel Mokake | Various | |
