= Dolly Dots =

Dutch girl group

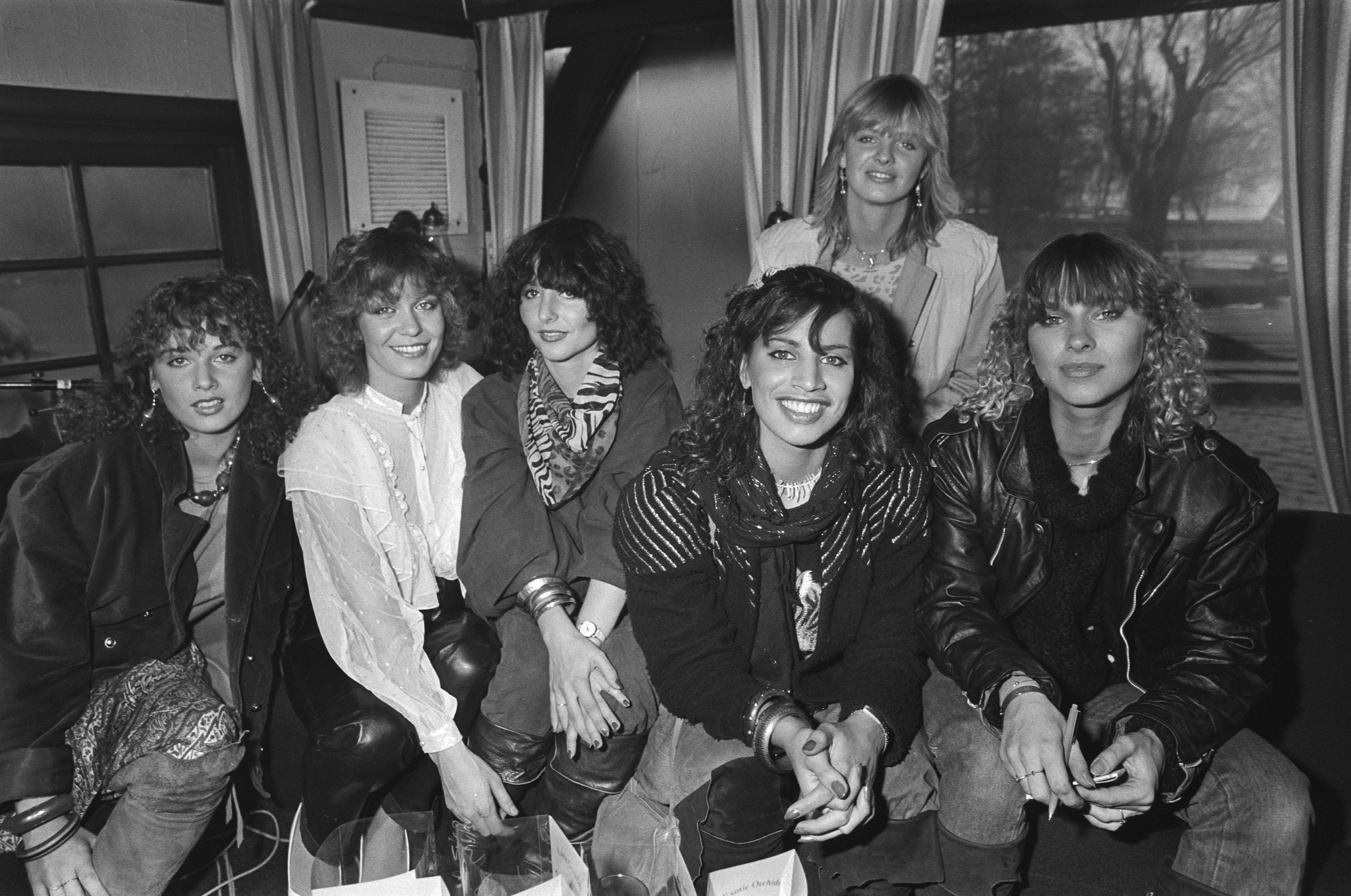
- Dolly Dots in 1981

Background information
- Origin: Netherlands
- Genres: Pop, Nederpop, dance, MOR
- Years active: 1979–1988, 1998, 2006–2008, 2015–present
- Labels: Warner Bros.
- Members: Angela Groothuizen; Angéla Kramers; Anita Heilker; Esther Oosterbeek; Patty Zomer
- Past members: Ria Brieffies

Dolly Dots are a Dutch pop girl band that formed in 1979. With their style of upbeat dance and pop, they scored many hits throughout Europe. The sextet consisted of Angela Groothuizen, Angéla Kramers, Anita Heilker, Esther Oosterbeek, Patty Zomer and Ria Brieffies.

== Biography ==
The Dolly Dots had many hits between 1979 and 1988. They were most successful in the Netherlands, but they also scored hits in the rest of Europe. Additionally, their single "Radio" was a big hit in Japan; it was featured in the educational documentary, "Germans and Their Cars". "P.S." was a Top 50 Billboard Hot Dance Club Play hit in 1981. They also enjoyed hits in Turkey, Lebanon, Iceland, and toured through Egypt.

Although the band were never successful in the United Kingdom, they did feature on the 23 June 1983 edition of Top of the Pops when they were interviewed by DJ John Peel whilst on location in Amsterdam.

At the peak of their success in 1984, the Dolly Dots had their own TV series, Barbie Dolls, Wallpaper, and a #1 hit, "Love Me Just a Little Bit More (Totally Hooked on You)". At the end of the following year, Anita Heilker left the group to have a daughter. She later became the Dutch voice of Donald Duck. The rest of the band continued as a five-piece.

Heilker had already launched her own career. In 1986, she released four solo singles ("You've Got Me Keyed Up", "Into the Night", "Dancing on the Moon" and "Don't Treat Me Like This"), as well as a solo album (The Girl in Black).

Since the TV series' success in 1984, there had been plans to record a Hollywood film. In the summer of 1986, the five remaining Dolly Dots finally went to the United States to work with an unfinished script and made a movie called Dutch Treat, which was released later that year. The movie (starring Lorin Dreyfuss and David Landsberg) and its soundtrack were modest successes in The Netherlands but were not released in the US due to poor reviews. The group broke up in 1988. Their last single was an attempt to break into the UK market. The Dolly Dots teamed up with hit producers Stock Aitken Waterman and released the song "What a Night". It reached number 18 in the Dutch charts, but was not successful in the UK.

On 2 October 1988, the Dolly Dots played a farewell show at the Amsterdam Escape. After more than 9 years, they felt the time was right to go their separate ways.

In 2016, the Dolly Dots returned for a special medley performance live on stage.

In 2021, the group revealed a brand new tour with dates across the Netherlands, however these had to be rescheduled due to the then Covid-19 pandemic.

== Solo careers ==
In 1989, Anita Heilker taped a sitcom with satirical duo Henk Spaan and Harry Vermeegen (Die 2, "Those 2" in English) for early 1990 broadcast on Veronica. She also has been the Dutch voice of Donald Duck for many years.

Angela Groothuizen teamed up with Ruud Mulder, former guitarist of disco and funk-contemporaries Spargo, to record as Angela & the Rude. She also began a television hosting career for AVRO starting in 1990 with an adaptation of Challenge Anneka; this was followed by Sex with Angela and later, Who's the Mole?. Her contract expired in 2005 and was not renewed. Groothuizen has since moved to RTL 4 where she was a panel judge for X Factor, The Voice of Holland and The Voice Kids. She is also host of the show Een Nieuw Begin. Groothuizen is still making music and has her own theatre shows.

Patty Zomer became a fashion stylist for several well-known Dutch artists and magazines. In the early 2000s, she co-hosted The Fashion Police with former actress Nada van Nie.

On 1 October 1998, all six Dolly Dots were interviewed by Paul de Leeuw and surprised everyone by singing a medley of three of their biggest hits. Two months later they reunited for a one-off concert to celebrate the 10th anniversary of their split, and the release of a compilation album of all their hits, called The Collection.

In 2003, Aad Ouberg, who was closely involved with the group, was responsible for getting a Dolly Dots musical off the ground. The musical Love Me Just a Little Bit More played at The Chassé Theatre in Breda and around the Netherlands during 2004.

As result of renewed interest in the group after the musical, Warner Bros. Records released a Dolly Dots greatest hits compilation album of the group as well as a DVD. In 2007, all six original members reunited for a series of guest performances during Vrienden van Amstel Live. Their success there led to three concerts of their own in Ahoy Rotterdam. The DVD of those concerts reached gold status in the Netherlands. In 2008, a tour followed, called 'Goodbye for Now'.

Ria Brieffies, who became a qualified manicurist and pedicurist, was diagnosed with cancer in November 2008; she died on 20 July 2009. Angela Groothuizen announced that without Brieffies, the Dolly Dots would never perform again.

In 2011, Anita Heilker made her comeback as a solo artist in a Dutch show called The Winner Is...

The remaining five members made a comeback as guest artists with the Toppers in May 2016.

Originally scheduled for 2020 but delayed because of the corona pandemic, the Dots embarked in 2021 on their Sisters on tour and released a new single.
