= The Magnificent Fraud =

1939 film by Robert Florey

- Directed by: Robert Florey
- Screenplay by: Gilbert Gabriel; Walter Ferris
- Based on: "Caviar for His Excellency" (short story) by Charles G. Booth
- Produced by: Harlan Thompson
- Starring: Akim Tamiroff; Lloyd Nolan; Mary Boland; Patricia Morison
- Cinematography: William C. Mellor
- Edited by: James Smith
- Production company: Paramount Pictures
- Distributed by: Paramount Pictures
- Release date: July 21, 1939 (United States)
- Running time: 78 minutes
- Country: United States
- Language: English

The Magnificent Fraud is a 1939 American crime film directed by Robert Florey and starring Akim Tamiroff, Lloyd Nolan, Mary Boland and Patricia Morison.

== Plot ==
Akim Tamiroff plays an actor performing in a nameless Latin American country who is pressed into service when the president is fatally injured by a bomb. Impersonating the president, the actor balances the pleasures and temptations of office, dangerous palace intrigue, and his duty to the people of the country.

The plot is identical to the 1988 Richard Dreyfuss film Moon over Parador; both are based on a short story by Charles G. Booth called "Caviar for His Excellency".

Parts of the film were shot in Balboa Park in San Diego.

== Cast ==
- Akim Tamiroff as Jules LaCroix / President Alvarado
- Lloyd Nolan as Sam Barr
- Mary Boland as Mme. Geraldine Genet
- Patricia Morison as Claire Hill
- Ralph Forbes as Harrison Todd
- Steffi Duna as Carmelita
- Ernest Cossart as Duval
- George Zucco as Dr. Luis Virgo
- Robert Warwick as General Pablo Hernandez
- Frank Reicher as Mendietta Garcia
- Robert Middlemass as Morales
- Abner Biberman as Ruiz
- Donald Gallaher as Dr. Diaz

== Production ==
George Raft had meant to play the lead but he refused the part so Lloyd Nolan replaced him. This had also happened on St Louis Blues. The disagreement led to Raft and Paramount parting ways.

== See also ==
- Moon over Parador
- Dave (film)
