= Detective School Dropouts =

- 1986 VHS video cover
- Directed by: Filippo Ottoni
- Written by: David Landsberg; Lorin Dreyfuss
- Produced by: Yoram Globus; Menahem Golan
- Starring: David Landsber; Lorin Dreyfuss
- Production company: The Cannon Group, Inc.
- Release date: August 8, 1986 (USA)
- Running time: 92 minutes
- Countries: United States; Italy
- Language: English
- Box office: $22,123

Detective School Dropouts is a 1986 action comedy film co-starring and written by David Landsberg and Lorin Dreyfuss for The Cannon Group, Inc..

In the film, a fan of detective novels applies for training as a private detective. His trainer takes advantage of him, and involves him in a conflict between three cheese-making families. The duo follow one of the family members to Italy, using stolen passports. When the man is poisoned, they become murder suspects.

== Plot ==
Donald Wilson David Landsberg tries to make a living in New York City with different jobs. He reads detective novels all the time, so that his distraction causes him to have various misadventures that repeatedly cost him his jobs. A notice at a telephone booth draws his attention to the detective training of Paul Miller Lorin Dreyfuss, whose school he attends. The school is located in a run-down office building and the Paul has all kinds of debts with various creditors. Instead of getting a decent education, Donald, the only detective candidate at the school, is financially exploited and has to take part in Paul's fraudulent actions to reduce his debts. Both of them accidentally get into conflict with three Italian cheese-making families, the Lombardis, the Zanettis and the Falcones. They discover Caterina Zanetti, the woman who was kidnapped by the Falcones and the woman Carlo Lombardi actually wanted to marry. Carlo has been told in a fake letter that Caterina has fallen in love with another man. The Falcones now want to marry him to Sonia Falcone in order to maintain their position in the Italian cheese market. Caterina can give the two unsuspecting Americans a message to deliver to their cousin Mario Zanetti at the airport so that the wedding can be stopped.

Paul and Donald drive to the airport, have to steal two passports from two Japanese businessmen to follow Mario Zanetti on the plane. Since they are being followed by the Falcones, they have to fly to Rome. On the flight Mario is poisoned, so the two of them have to deliver the message. Since Donald lost his wallet when Mario was murdered, he now also becomes a suspect in a murder case. In their search for Carlo, Paul and Donald are constantly exposed to persecution by their families, so that they are constantly on the run and have to disguise themselves as monks. In spite of everything, they manage to get the message across to Carlo that Caterina still loves him. Carlo wants to cancel the wedding with Sonia, but is blackmailed with the killing of Caterina if he does not marry Sonia.

In contrast to Paul, Donald still wants to prevent the wedding. After a short stopover in Pisa, they drive to Venice for the planned wedding. After Carlo and Caterina meet on a canal, Paul manages to free Caterina, while Donald is able to tie up the supposed bride Sonia. They exchange the bride and only when the veil is lifted does Carlo face his beloved Caterina. The families draw their weapons, but see the event in the church as a sign from God, so that the wedding continues. A reward of 25,000 dollars is refused by Paul, as he is allowed to keep what he considers a valuable pendant. Back in New York, the two want to sell the pendant and it turns out that it is actually worth 300,000 Italian lira.

== Cast ==
- David Landsberg as Donald Wilson
- Lorin Dreyfuss as Paul Miller
- Christian De Sica as Carlo Lombardi
- George Eastman as Bruno Falcone
- Valeria Golino as Caterina Zanetti
- Mario Brega as Don Lombardi
- Rik Battaglia as Don Zanetti
- Alberto Farnese as Don Falcone
- Ennio Antonelli as Riccardino
- Giancarlo Prete as Mario Zanetti

== Legacy ==
The film was not successful at the box office, but subsequently gained cult film status. It is noted for its low-budget production values, cheesy '80's synth soundtrack, and being the only film released from The Cannon Group to have lost money at the box office. However, it is also representative of '80 culture at the time when slapstick briefly resurfaced in popularity with American audiences.

== Home media ==
Detective School Drop Outs was released on DVD from MGM in October 2011.
