= Skatetown, U.S.A. =

1979 film by William A. Levey

- Theatrical release poster
- Directed by: William A. Levey
- Written by: Nick Castle (screenplay and story); Lorin Dreyfuss (story); William A. Levey (story)
- Produced by: Lorin Dreyfuss (producer); William A. Levey (producer); Peter E. Strauss (executive producer)
- Starring: Scott Baio; Patrick Swayze; Flip Wilson; Maureen McCormick; Katherine Kelly Lang
- Cinematography: Donald M. Morgan
- Edited by: Gene Fowler Jr.
- Music by: Miles Goodman; Dave Mason; John Beal
- Production company: Rastar
- Distributed by: Columbia Pictures
- Release date: October 1979
- Running time: 94 minutes
- Country: United States
- Language: English
- Box office: $2.35 million

Skatetown, U.S.A. is a 1979 American comedy musical film produced to capitalize on the short-lived fad of roller disco. Directed by William A. Levey, the film features many television stars from the 1960s and 1970s, among them Scott Baio, Flip Wilson, Maureen McCormick, Ron Palillo and Ruth Buzzi. Patrick Swayze's leading role as the skater "Ace" was his first movie performance. Also in the cast are Sydney Lassick, Billy Barty and Playboy centerfold model Dorothy Stratten.

== Plot ==
One evening at a Los Angeles roller disco called Skatetown, U.S.A., a rivalry between two skaters culminates in a contest, the winning prize for which is $1,000 and a moped. After a game of chicken played on motorized roller skates, the two rivals become friends.

== Cast ==
- Scott Baio as Richie
- Flip Wilson as Harvey Ross
- Patrick Swayze as Ace Johnson
- Maureen McCormick as Susan Nelson
- Greg Bradford as Stan Nelson
- Ron Palillo as Frankey
- Judy Landers as Teri
- Ruth Buzzi as Elvira
- Dorothy Stratten as customer at snack bar (girl who orders pizza)
- Joe E. Ross as rent-a-cop
- Dave Mason as himself
- Billy Barty as Jimmy
- Katherine Kelly Lang as Allison Johnson
- David Landsberg as Irwin
- Sydney Lassick as Murray
- Murray Langston as the drunk
- Bill Kirchenbauer as Skatetown doctor
- Denny Johnston as the wizard (club DJ)
- Vic Dunlop as Ripple
- Len Bari as Alphonse
- April Allen as Charlene (Ace's girlfriend and skating partner)

== Production notes ==
The setting is based on Flipper's Roller Boogie Palace, a disco roller rink which had opened in West Hollywood on Santa Monica Boulevard earlier in 1979 and was fleetingly a very popular celebrity hangout. The film includes many short, broadly comedic and slapstick subplots set between long roller skating sequences and musical performances.

Filming was done mostly at the Hollywood Palladium, built in 1940. Its sprawling blond hardwood dance floor, chandeliers and soap bubbles blown by a machine from the Lawrence Welk Show can be seen in sundry scenes. Some exteriors were shot on Santa Monica Pier and at nearby Venice Beach. Patrick Swayze, who had roller skated competitively as a teenager and was a trained dancer, did his own skating and stunts in the film. April Allen, Swayze's uncredited roller-skating partner in the movie, had won the world championship in women's free skating seven years earlier.

Twenty-nine years after filming, Maureen McCormick recalled that there was a lot of cocaine being done on the set. McCormick wrote that she fell back into severe cocaine addiction during production, often showing up late for shooting or not coming to work at all.

Scott Baio later said:

I have blocked that movie from my memory, it was so bad...That was that whole time where Xanadu and Roller Boogie and all that crap was coming out. That was one of those things where they sent me the script and I said 'no', but they just kept calling and offering more money! I mean, they offered me a lot of money. And finally I said 'Well, hell. What is it? Two weeks' work? Whatever. Okay. Fine'. And it was...You know, sometimes money isn't everything. [Laughs.] It was just bad. I mean, it was bad shooting it. I'm trying to think of any real stories that I have, but it was just insanity. When was that? '79? It was just a guy making a film who didn't know how to make a film. And I don't even know what the story was! Skatetown, U.S.A.? That was crapola.

== Soundtrack ==
Skatetown, U.S.A.

Soundtrack album by various artists
- Released: 1979
- Genre: Disco
- Length: 39:00
- Label: Columbia

The film features almost non-stop synchronized music, much by popular disco and pop artists from the mid and late 1970s. Most of this music is diegetic, in that it is shown within the plot as being played either through records spun by the roller disco's "wizard" DJ or performed on the club's stage and hence, is heard by both the characters and the movie's audience. Dave Mason, who sings the movie's disco-tinged theme song "Skatetown" (written by himself and Brenda Cooper) over the opening credits, is featured as a performer in the roller disco, singing "I Fell in Love" along with a cover of his own 1968 Traffic hit "Feelin' Alright". The Beach Boys also submitted a song called "Skatetown U.S.A." for use on the soundtrack but it was not used. Among other songs on the soundtrack are the dance hit "Born to Be Alive" by Patrick Hernandez, "Boogie Wonderland" (Earth, Wind & Fire and The Emotions), "Shake Your Body" (The Jacksons), "Boogie Nights" (Heatwave), "Baby Hold On" (Eddie Money), "Ain't No Stoppin' Us Now" (McFadden & Whitehead), "I Want You to Want Me" (Cheap Trick), "Roller Girl" (John Sebastian), "Perfect Dancer" (Marilyn McCoo and Billy Davis Jr.), "Disco Nights (Rock-Freak)" by GQ, a cover of Mick Jagger and Keith Richards' "Under My Thumb" by the Hounds, and "Skatetown U.S.A." (John Beal) during the end credits.

A soundtrack album was released in 1979 by Columbia Records.

Side A:

1. "Skatetown" – Dave Mason (3:11)
2. "Boogie Wonderland" – Earth, Wind & Fire (4:49)
3. "Shake Your Body (Down to the Ground)" – The Jacksons (3:45)
4. "Boogie Nights" – Heatwave (3:38)
5. "Born to Be Alive" – Patrick Hernandez (3:23)

Side B:

1. "Roller Girl" – John Sebastian (3:10)
2. "Perfect Dancer" – Marilyn McCoo & Billy Davis Jr. (6:28)
3. "I Fell in Love" – Dave Mason (2:21)
4. "Under My Thumb" – Hounds (4:17)
5. "Feelin' Alright" – Dave Mason (4:30)

== Reception ==
Following a widely publicized premiere party at Flipper's roller disco in West Hollywood on October 1, 1979 and billed as the Rock and Roller Disco Movie of the Year, by the time of its release roller disco was a fast-waning fad and the popularity of disco music had peaked (Disco Demolition Night had happened two and a half months earlier). Aside from some praise for Swayze's skating and screen presence the film was neither a critical nor a box-office success. By 2012, a writer for oddculture.com called the film "a true cult item and one of the best 70s time capsules around...There's just something magical about a slutty Marsha [sic] eating drugged pizza with a bearded Horshack".

== Home media ==
Skatetown USA has been shown on cable television, but for many years, there were no VHS or DVD releases, allegedly due to difficulties with obtaining the rights to the many 1970s hits on the soundtrack. Meanwhile, 35mm and 16mm full frame prints of the film have been exhibited at film revivals and low quality video copies made from a much faded full frame 16mm print have been in commercial circulation.

Finally, on March 6, 2019, a 35mm print was screened for the first time in years at Los Angeles' New Beverly Cinema on a double bill with Roller Boogie. This print was released by Sony on Blu-ray on September 24 of that year; it was a bare bones release with only the movie included on the disc. No extras were included, and no menu system was provided.

== See also ==
- Car Wash (1976)
- Saturday Night Fever (1977)
- Sgt. Pepper's Lonely Hearts Club Band (1978)
- Thank God It's Friday (1978)
- Roller Boogie (1979)
- The Apple (1980)
- Xanadu (1980)
- Can't Stop the Music (1980)
- Fame (1980)
- Get Rollin' (1980), roller disco documentary
