= Moon over Parador =

1988 film by Paul Mazursky

Moon Over Parador
- Theatrical release poster
- Directed by: Paul Mazursky
- Screenplay by: Leon Capetanos; Paul Mazursky
- Based on: "Caviar for His Excellency" by Charles G. Booth
- Produced by: Paul Mazursky
- Starring: Richard Dreyfuss; Raul Julia; Sônia Braga; Jonathan Winters; Fernando Rey
- Cinematography: Donald McAlpine
- Edited by: Stuart H. Pappé
- Music by: Maurice Jarre
- Production company: Universal Pictures
- Distributed by: Universal Pictures
- Release dates: September 4, 1988 (MWFF); September 9, 1988 (United States)
- Running time: 104 minutes
- Country: United States
- Language: English
- Budget: $19 million
- Box office: $11.4 million

Moon Over Parador is a 1988 American romantic comedy film directed and produced by Paul Mazursky, who co-wrote the screenplay with Leon Capetanos. The film is based on the short story "Caviar for His Excellency" by Charles G. Booth and is a loose remake of the 1939 film The Magnificent Fraud. It stars Richard Dreyfuss as a little-known actor hired to impersonate a deceased Latin American dictator, with Raul Julia and Sônia Braga in supporting roles.

The film had its world premiere at the Montreal World Film Festival on September 4, 1988, and was theatrically released in the United States on September 9, 1988, by Universal Pictures. It received mixed reviews from critics and was a box-office bomb, despite praise for the performances of the cast. For their performances, Julia and Braga earned Golden Globe nominations for Best Supporting Actor and Best Supporting Actress, respectively.

== Plot ==
The film follows the exploits of film actor Jack Noah, who is filming in the small, fictional South American country of Parador when Paradorian President Alfonse Simms, a dictator, invites him and the cast and crew to the film at their palace. Simms seems delighted at Jack's imitation of him.

Suddenly, Alfonse Simms dies of a heart attack. Not wanting to lose his position in power, the president's right-hand man, Roberto Strausmann, forces Jack to take the 'role of a lifetime'—that of the dead president, as the two men look so much alike. Jack accepts, eventually winning over the people and even the dead president's mistress, Madonna (Braga). For over a year, the two bond, and she shows Jack how the people are suffering under the dictatorship, particularly at the iron hand of Roberto (the real power behind the scene and who continues the charade in order to become president himself) against the rebels.

Jack creates a plan where, in the middle of a show featuring Sammy Davis Jr., he (as Simms) is apparently gunned down by an assassin. Before dying, "Simms" accuses Roberto of ordering the assassination, provoking the angry crowd to beat and kick him to death. Inside a van, Jack escapes. Months later, he is telling the story to his friends, who do not believe him. Jack is happy to learn that Madonna led a revolution and is now the democratically elected president of Parador.

== Cast ==
- Richard Dreyfuss as Jack Noah / Alfonse Simms
- Raul Julia as Roberto Strausmann
- Sônia Braga as Madonna Mendez
- Jonathan Winters as Ralph
- Fernando Rey as Alejandro
- Sammy Davis Jr. as Himself
- Michael Greene as Clint
- Polly Holliday as Midge
- Milton Gonçalves as Carlo
- Charo as Madame Lupe
- Marianne Sägebrecht as Magda Feldmarck
- René Kolldehoff as Gunther Feldmarck
- Richard Russell Ramos as Dieter Lopez
- José Lewgoy as The Archbishop
- Dann Florek as Toby
- Roger Aaron Brown as Desmond
- Dana Delany as Jenny
- Dick Cavett as Himself
- Ike Pappas as Himself
- Edward Asner as Himself
- Carlotta Gerson as Momma
- Lorin Dreyfuss as Alphonse Simms, 1st Dictator
- Nika Bonfim as Carmen
- John C. Broderick as The Director
- David Cale as Edgar Low
- Reuven Bar-Yotam as Menachem Fein
- Rod McCary as Gordon Boyd

== Production ==
The basic plot of Moon Over Parador came from a B film titled The Magnificent Fraud (1939), in which Akim Tamiroff played the actor-turned-dictator. The screenplay was written by Paul Mazursky and Leon Capetanos, who had previously collaborated on Tempest (1982), Moscow on the Hudson (1984), and Down and Out in Beverly Hills (1986). Mazursky had also worked with Richard Dreyfuss in the lattermost.

Mazursky and Capetanos invented the fictional country of Parador as the film's setting after traveling through Guatemala, El Salvador, Trinidad and Tobago, and Jamaica and researching "all the Latin American dictatorships" in April 1986. Mazursky said that the country could be "Paraguay or Ecuador or whatever you want it to be."

Principal photography began on August 17, 1987, and wrapped on October 26, 1987, with a budget of approximately $19–$20 million. The film was shot entirely on location in Rio de Janeiro, Ouro Preto, and Salvador de Bahia, Brazil and New York City.

Mazursky dressed up in drag to portray Momma, "the haughty, disdainful mother of a Caribbean dictator." He was credited as Carlotta Gerson, his mother's maiden name. Judith Malina had been hired to play the role, but was unable to make it due to another engagement in Germany.

The real President Alphonse Simms was played by Dreyfuss' older brother, Lorin, while Mazursky's wife and daughter, Betsy and Jill, appeared as woman at buffet and assistant director, respectively.

During a scene where Jack has to address the crowd as the Paradorian dictator, he ad-libs his lines and uses the lyrics for the song "The Impossible Dream" from Man of La Mancha. During a celebration for the Paradorian dictator, Sammy Davis Jr. sings "Begin the Beguine". Sammy Davis Jr.'s rendition of Parador's national anthem is sung against the music for "Bésame Mucho". The previous Paradorian National Anthem ("O Parador") is played to the tune of "O Christmas Tree", which begins with the tune of the "Wedding March".

== Release ==
Moon Over Parador had its world premiere on the closing day of the 12th Montreal World Film Festival on September 4, 1988. The film was originally scheduled for release in July 1988, but was pushed back to September 9.

== Reception ==
=== Critical response ===
On the review aggregator website Rotten Tomatoes, 42% of 12 critics' reviews are positive, with an average rating of 4.8/10.

Janet Maslin of The New York Times wrote, "Though Mr. Mazursky's new Moon Over Parador has the makings of a clever satire, it never gets beyond the fond, gentle mood of an amusing travelogue." She also noted, "The film's jokes about actors are affectionate, but its political satire is notably weak. […] The film's closing turn of events, which has the potential to be quite diabolical, is one of many comic opportunities that Mr. Mazursky, very uncharacteristically, lets slip away."

Hal Hinson of The Washington Post stated, "Moon Over Parador wants to be a political satire, but it has more to say about Broadway and Hollywood than about totalitarian dictatorships" and "The political situations in the film are too generic, and too facile, to have any resonance. As a result, the film's satire appears toothless and its politics, in general, a fashionable pose. In Moon Over Parador, Mazursky is shrewd about the superficiality of show people without realizing that he has left himself open to the same charge."

Michael Wilmington of the Los Angeles Times commented, "Not that Moon doesn't have lots of incidental pleasures and ripe, loony laughs. The movie is a comedy about actors and politics, a satire in which power and illusion trip prettily over each other's feet."

Roger Ebert of the Chicago Sun-Times gave the film 2 out of 4 stars and noted, "If the Dreyfuss character in Moon Over Parador had been conceived on a more realistic basis, perhaps Mazursky and Dreyfuss could have had more fun exploring the true insecurities of the profession, instead of the stereotyped ones."

The staff at Variety wrote, "Mazursky's elaborate farce about the actor as imposter has moments of true hilarity emerging only fitfully from a ponderous production" and "Dreyfuss' panache carries the film most of the way, ably played off Braga's lusty and glamourous [sic] character."

=== Accolades ===
Year	Award	Category	Nominee	Result	Ref.
1989	46th Golden Globe Awards	Best Supporting Actor	Raul Julia	Nominated	
1989	46th Golden Globe Awards	Best Supporting Actress	Sônia Braga	Nominated	

== See also ==
- List of film remakes (A–M)
