= Get Rollin' (film) =

- Directed by: J. Terrance Mitchell
- Written by: J. Terrance Mitchell
- Release date: April 25, 1980 (US)
- Running time: 90 minutes
- Country: United States
- Language: English

Get Rollin' is a 1980 American roller disco docudrama film directed by J. Terrance Mitchell.

The film focuses on various skating personalities at Brooklyn's Empire Rollerdrome. It features numerous interviews, roller disco footage, stunts to popular songs, and dramatized versions of their auditions.

Specifically, it features skaters Pat "the Cat" Richardson, also known as "the Cowboy"; and Vincent "Vinzerelli" Brown, a caseworker with New York Family Court.

External videos
- Get Rollin' on Archive.org

== Reception ==
In 1980, Vincent Canby of The New York Times praised the film's engagement and format, as "deceptively simple". The review also complimented the starring cast, and concluded that the film was "so full of genuine good feelings that one comes out of theater in a state of something like pure, wonderful elation."

In 2015, Indiewire similarly commented that the two starring skaters were "bright, funny, colorful, and above all inspiring" but criticised the overall structure as loose and that several scenes were "very painfully and obviously staged".

Roger Angell from The New Yorker called it a "noisy and imperfect semidocumentary" and an attempt to recreate "Saturday Night Fever on wheels". The reviewer criticised the film's long length and poor plot, but complimented an "inventive" cinematic shot featuring Pat the Cat skating on the Brooklyn Bridge and wrote that "there is a lot pleasure of in watching the wonderful skaters".

Upon its release, the film did not screen extensively. It was broadcast on television in the Netherlands in an unknown year.

== Featured songs ==
- "Dance with Me" by Peter Brown, 1978

== See also ==
Other films released during the late 1970s disco and jukebox musical craze

- Saturday Night Fever (1977)
- Thank God It's Friday (1978)
- Sgt. Pepper's Lonely Hearts Club Band (1978)
- Skatetown, U.S.A. (1979)
- The Apple (1980)
- Xanadu (1980)
- Can't Stop the Music (1980)
- Fame (1980)
