= Martin Smith (entertainer) =

British singer and actor

Martin Smith (26 June 1957 – 5 November 1994) was a British actor, singer, and composer. He starred in many shows in London's West End, including Evita, March of the Falsettos, The Phantom of the Opera, Les Misérables, and Children of Eden. He died from complications of AIDS at the age of 37.

== Career ==
Smith was born in Glasgow, Scotland, the son of a barmaid and a railway worker.

=== Performing ===
==== Television ====
He made various appearances on television but Martin Smith was best known as Mickey Doyle (1985–1986) in the long-running British soap Crossroads. His acting debut was made in Scotland in BBC's Play for Today. He subsequently made various appearances in television shows such as Fox, Very Like a Whale, One-Upmanship, Question of Guilt, Henry V, Follow the Star, Jackanory, Playhouse, Secret Army, House on the Hill, and The Kelly Monteith Show.

==== Theatre ====
He later moved south and began to land leading roles in West End musicals including Billy, Something's Afoot, Let The Good Stones Roll, The Great American Backstage Musical and The Umbrellas of Cherbourg. He also had regional theatre experience, playing for two seasons at the Leicester Haymarket Theatre with roles in the critically acclaimed Sophocles Trilogy, and he also played Stephen Foster in a show about the composer's life entitled Beautiful Dreamer.

He took over the role of Che in the original London production of Evita from 1982 to 1983.

In 1984, played Jerry Adair in the original London cast of the musical Peg.

He also appeared as Marvin in a production of William Finn's March of the Falsettos at the Library Theatre in Manchester in 1987 and later at the Albery Theatre in London, and that same year he appeared in No Way To Treat A Lady at the Thorndike Theatre in Leatherhead.

From 1987 to 1988, he played Marius Pontmercy, and understudied Jean Valjean, in Les Misérables. In 1989, he appeared as Bamatabois on Les Misérables: The Complete Symphonic Recording.

In 1988 he starred in a new London production of Noël Coward's operetta Bitter Sweet.

In 1989, Smith became the third principal actor to portray The Phantom in the West End production of The Phantom of the Opera.

In 1991, he created the role of Adam in the original London production of Children of Eden.

His final public performance was as Stine in the original London production of the musical City of Angels.

==== Concerts ====
He recorded several concerts with the BBC Concert and Radio Orchestras and, during the 1980s, was a regular vocalist on the BBC Radio 2 shows Songs From the Shows and Friday Night is Music Night.

He was featured in the Cole Porter revue A Swell Party - A Celebration of Cole Porter (1992) at London's Vaudeville Theatre, singing "Love For Sale" as it was originally intended to be sung - by a man. He also played the piano in the revue.

In the 1980s Smith became a member of The Salvation Army at Regent Hall Corps in Oxford Street, London. He gave several concerts for the organisation and recorded the song "I'll Make My Promises" for the soundtrack album for the Gowans/Larsson musical The Blood of the Lamb, released in 1981.

=== Composing ===
As a composer Smith wrote scores for several musicals, including King, The Rainbow Girl, That Golden Fortune, Mountains of Peru, Mezzaluna and La Tosca. He recorded several songs from those shows on a solo album a year before his death.

== Death ==
In November 1993, Martin Smith was diagnosed as HIV positive, and he died from AIDS-related illnesses a year later on 4 November 1994, in London. The funeral was held at the Actor's Church, Covent Garden.

A year after his death, A Handful of Keys, a gala tribute concert was held in his honour at the Prince Edward Theatre, London. The concert featured Michael Ball, John Barrowman, Tracie Bennett, Dora Bryan, Ruthie Henshall, Sally Ann Howes, Millicent Martin, Jane Rossington, Lily Savage, Marti Webb and many other of his co-stars.

== Recordings ==
- Great Duets From The Musicals
- "I'll Make My Promises" from The Blood of the Lamb (1981)
- Peg: A Romantic New Musical (1984)
- An Evening With Alan Jay Lerner (1987)
- Bitter Sweet - London Cast (1988)
- Les Misérables: Complete Symphonic Recording (1988)
- Hey, Mr. Producer! (1990)
- Children of Eden the Musical: The Original Cast Recording (1991)
- Martin Smith & A Handful Of Keys (1991)
- A Swell Party: A Celebration of Cole Porter - Original London Cast (1991)
- Child Of The Earth (1993)
- City of Angels: Original London Cast Recording (1993)
- The Magic Of The British Musicals (1994)
