= Charles G. Booth =

British-born American writer (1896–1949)

- Born: Charles Gordon Booth; February 12, 1896; Manchester, England
- Died: May 22, 1949 (aged 53); Beverly Hills, California
- Occupation: Writer (novelist)
- Writing career
- Period: 20th century
- Genre: Fiction

Charles Gordon Booth (February 12, 1896 – May 22, 1949) was a British-born writer who settled in America and wrote several classic Hollywood stories, including The General Died at Dawn (1936) and Sundown (1941). He won an Academy Award for Best Story for The House on 92nd Street in 1945, a thinly disguised version of the FBI "Duquesne Spy Ring saga", which led to the largest espionage conviction in the history of the United States. He also penned the short story "Caviar for His Excellency" which was the basis for the play "The Magnificent Fraud" and was the basis for Paul Mazursky's 1988 film Moon Over Parador.

== Works ==
- Sinister House, (1926)
- Gold Bullets, (1929)
- Murder At High Tide, (1930)
- Seven Alibis, (1932)
- The Cat And The Clock, (1935)
- The General Died At Dawn, (1937)
- Mr Angel Comes Aboard, (1944)
- Murder Strikes Thrice, (1946)
