= Giant Olive Theatre Company =

Theatre company in England

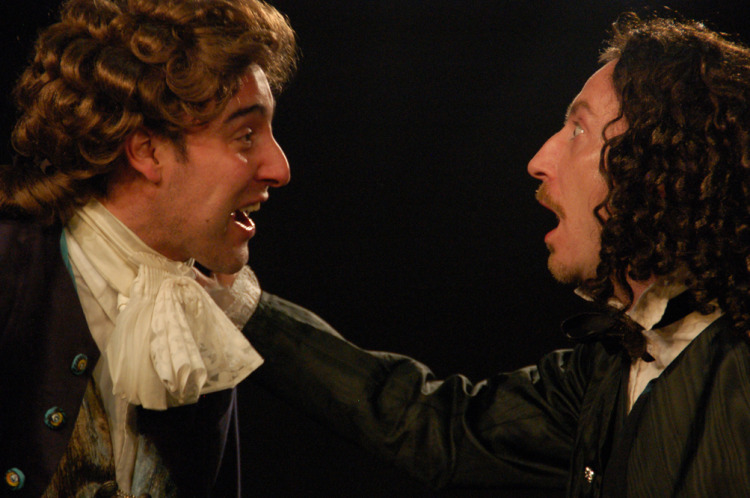
- The Hostess of the Inn

Website
- www.giantolive.com

Giant Olive Theatre Company was founded in the summer of 2008 by Artistic Director George Sallis. The company stages classical theatre, commedia dell'arte, dance, contemporary plays, comedy, new writing and has become well known for its Charles Dickens Christmas adaptations, along with its bold dance projects, including the GOlive Dance and Performance Festival, curated by Donald Hutera (The Times).

Hugh Bonneville is a Patron of the company. Associate artists include Ray Shell (Starlight Express, The Lion King), Antonia Franceschi (FAME, New York City Ballet), Mark Baldwin Rambert Dance Company and Zoe Martlew.

== Dance ==
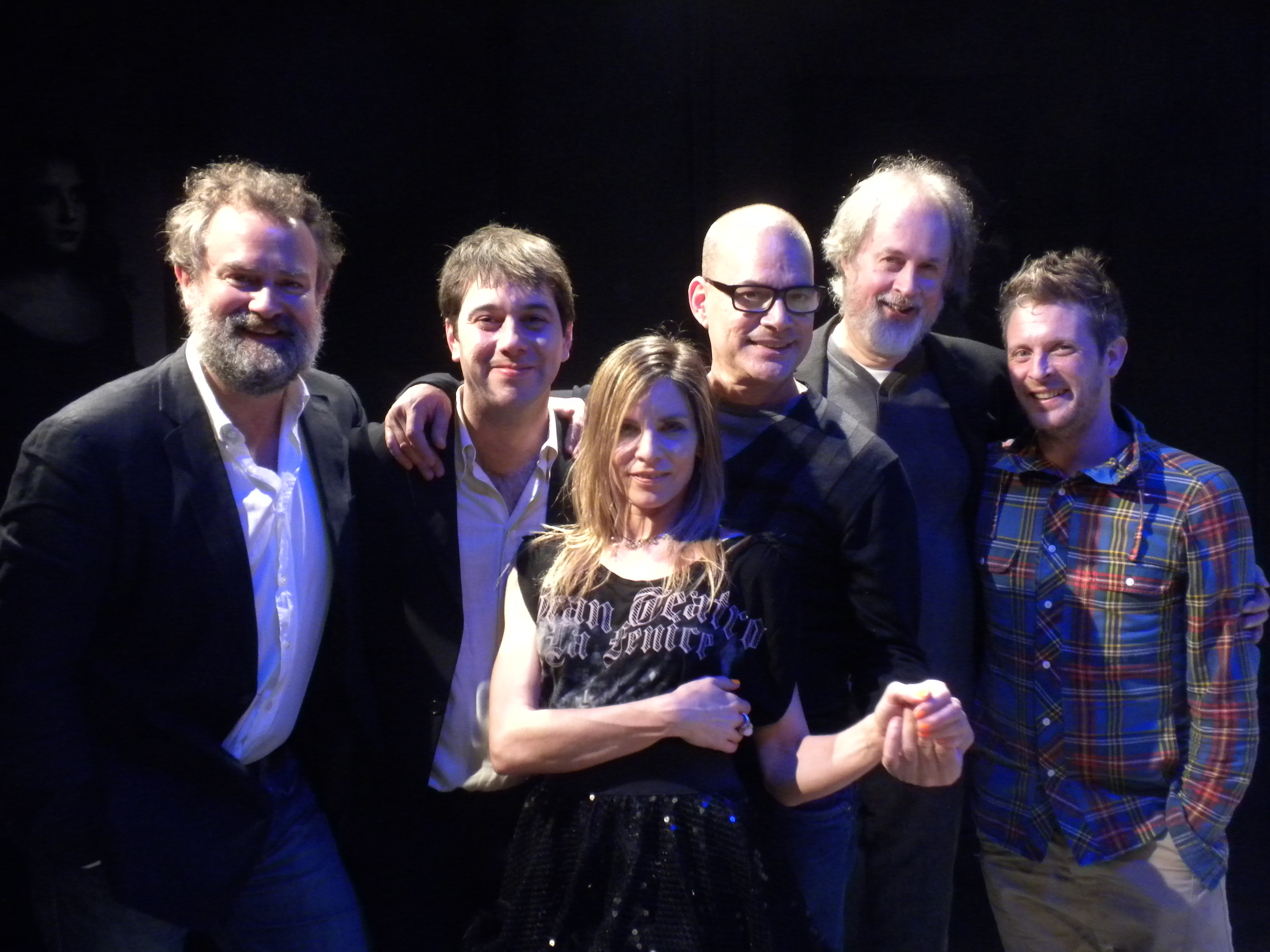
From left to right: Hugh Bonneville, George Sallis, Antonia Franceschi, Mark Baldwin, Richard Alston, Martin Lawrence, 22 January 2011

In 2013, Giant Olive produced the inaugural GOlive Dance and Performance festival, curated by veteran arts journalist Donald Hutera, whose writing has appeared in The Times, Time Out, Dance Europe and many other publications and websites worldwide. The festival patrons were Siobhan Davies and Rosemary Butcher. Spread across 21 consecutive days, and comprising over four dozen individuals or companies, the GOlive Festival featured work by Darren Ellis, Ella Mesma, Renaud Wiser, Anusha Subramanyam, Daniel Hay-Gordon/Eleanor Perry, 70/30 Split, Shane Shambhu, Nuno Silva, Moreno Solinas, Peta Lily, The Dangerologists, Stephanie Schober, Anna Williams, Stopgap's Sg2, Angela Woodhouse, Dog Kennel Hill Project, Avatâra Ayuso, Mickael Marso Rivière, Jennifer Jackson/Susie Crow, Annie Lok, Zoi Dimitriou and Fred Gehrig amongst many others. Between them the artist involved had worked with the likes of Complicité, Richard Alston, Siobhan Davies, Shobana Jeyasingh, Russell Maliphant, The Royal Ballet, Wayne McGregor|Random Dance, Rambert Dance Company, Henri Oguike, Arthur Pita and Fiona Shaw.

In 2011, George Sallis and Antonia Franceschi teamed up to produce a Gala performance, to mark the closure of the Lion & Unicorn Theatre for refurbishment. The evening included performances choreographed by Richard Alston, Mark Baldwin, Martin Lawrence, and Jonathan Goddard, with poetry directed by Patsy Rodenburg, and "Disco" from Giant Olive's POP8, again featuring Ballet Black.

In June 2009, Giant Olive Theatre Company produced POP8, with Antonia Franceschi, a new dance theatre piece incorporating a short film by Tal Rosner and Franceschi set in Kentish Town, and an additional film by Terry Braun also featuring Franceschi, which was choreographed by Rambert's Mark Baldwin. Performers included Ballet Black dancers, resident at the Royal Opera House, Zoe Martlew on cello and voiceovers from Franceschi and George Sallis directed by Patsy Rodenburg. The production was supported by Camden Council. and received Critic's Choice in London's TimeOut.

== The ZIP Project (Gun & Knife Crime) ==
Giant Olive received Time Out Critics Choice in 2010, for its Community Outreach project, ZIP:Gun & Knife Crime. With the support of The Big Lottery Fund, Camden Council and Choice FM, the company ran workshops in Camden with people affected by gun and knife crime as victims or perpetrators. Working with the experiences and stories told, Giant Olive produced an original streetdance musical. The project was supported by Local MP, Rt Hon Frank Dobson, Councillor Tulip Siddiq, Councillor Abdul Hai and Chief Superintendent Neil Wilson.

== The Gaea Theatre Festival ==
The Gaea Theatre Festival celebrates international women playwrights, performers, directors and designers and was launched by Giant Olive in August 2011. The festival received seven award nominations from the OffWestEnd.com Theatre Awards and Time Out Critic's Choice for Caroline Horton's I'll Show You Mine.

== Little Olives ==
Little Olives is Giant Olive's children's theatre company.

== Productions ==
- 2015: Just Dance. UK premiere. Produced by AFD/Giant Olive at the Theatre Royal Winchester, choreography by Antonia Franceschi, featuring performers from the Royal Ballet, Rambert, Ballet Black and Random Dance
- 2013–2015: GOlive Dance and Performance Festival. Curated by Donald Hutera
- 2011: An Experiment zith zn Air Pump, Shelagh Stephenson. Directed by Liisa Smith,
- 2011: I'll Show You Mine. Adapted and performed by Caroline Horton, produced by Giant Olive Theatre Company
- 2011: Beauty Is Prison-Time. Written and performed by Zoe Mavroudi,
- 2011: Tom Jones, Henry Fielding. Directed by Edward Kingham,
- 2011: Go Gala, George Sallis (GO Artistic Director), Antonia Franceschi (GO Artistic Advisor), Mark Baldwin (artistic director, Rambert), Richard Alston (artistic director, The Place), Martin Lawrence (Choreographer)
- 2010–11: A Christmas Carol, Charles Dickens
- 2010: ZIP:Gun & Knife Crime. Produced by George Sallis.
- 2009-10: Oliver Twist, Charles Dickens. Adapted by Piers Beckley, directed by Ray Shell
- 2009–10: Supernatural, Written by Aline Waites and Jago Turner, directed by Mykal Rand
- 2009: Kitty and Damnation, Written by Joseph Crilly
- 2009: Pop8, with Antonia Franceschi, Zoë Martlew and Ballet Black
- 2009: Getting Out, Sarah Henley. Directed by Francis Watson and Gillian Foley
- 2009: Dark Tales, Hans Christian Andersen
- 2008–09: A Christmas Carol, Charles Dickens. Adapted by Piers Beckley
- 2008: The Hostess of the Inn, Carlo Goldoni. Translated and adapted by Katherine Gregor, directed by Alex Hunter
- 2008: Antigone, Sophocles
- 2008: Adult Orgasm, Dario Fo and Franka Rame
- 2008: The Would Be Gentleman, Molière. Directed by Alex Hunter

== Awards and nominations ==
- Nominations for Offies:
  - 2011 Most Promising New Playwright for Beauty Is Prison-Time
  - 2011 Best Female Performer for Beauty Is Prison-Time
  - 2011 Best Director for Beauty Is Prison-Time
  - 2011 Best Female Performer for I'll Show You Mine
  - 2011 Best Director for I'll Show You Mine
- Best Female Performer for Nine
- Best Male Performer for Not About Heroes

== Giant Olive team ==
The Giant Olive team

- Group Artistic Director George Sallis
- Artistic Associate Tamzin Paskins

The Giant Olive patron

- Giant Olive Theatre Company Hugh Bonneville

Production team

- Head of Technical Department Ciaran Cunningham

Advisors Artistic Advisor Donald Hutera
