= David Landsberg =

American actor, writer, and producer (1944–2018)

- Born: September 3, 1944; Brooklyn, New York, U.S.
- Died: August 5, 2018 (aged 73); Los Angeles, California, U.S.
- Occupations: Actor; writer; producer
- Years active: 1975–2010

David Landsberg (September 3, 1944 – August 5, 2018) was an American actor, writer, and producer. He was sometimes credited as Dave Landsburg. He both acted in and co-wrote several comedies throughout the 1980s.

== Early life ==
David Landsberg was born in Brooklyn, New York City, New York. His parents were Arthur and Sylvia Lansberg, who had two sons, David and his older brother Joseph. David attended Plainedge High School in North Massapequa, New York, and attended what was Hofstra College for two years before serving in the Signal Corps of the US Army in Vietnam from 1966 to 1968. He graduated from the University of Maryland in 1970 with a degree in business and marketing.

== Career ==
Landsberg co-starred and co-wrote the 1986 action-comedy Detective School Dropouts with Lorin Dreyfuss. In 1987 they teamed up again for Dutch Treat. Both films flopped at the box office. He acted in the films Shoot the Moon with Albert Finney and Diane Keaton, Loose Shoes with Bill Murray, Love at First Bite with George Hamilton and Arte Johnson, and Skatetown, U.S.A. with Patrick Swayze and Dorothy Stratten.

His television credits include a regular role on NBC's C.P.O. Sharkey and the voice of Woody on Hanna-Barbera's animated series The Buford Files, as well as guest-starring roles on The Love Boat, Fantasy Island, Eight Is Enough, and Hart to Hart, as well as the voice for Mr. Griff in the Playhouse Disney series Stanley.

Landsberg was an executive producer and writer on such series as Cosby, Herman's Head, Daddy's Girls, and Love Boat: The Next Wave.

In 2010, he wrote the screenplay for Sex Tax: Based on a True Story.

== Personal life and death ==
Landsberg was married to Jean Hunt from 1966 until their divorce in 1987. They had a daughter, Caryn O'Neill and a son, Daniel Landsberg.

Landsberg died at age 73 on August 5, 2018, at Cedars-Sinai Medical Center in Los Angeles from complications that arose from surgery for esophageal cancer and is interred at Riverside National Cemetery in Riverside, California.
