= National Shrine of Our Lady of the Snows =

Catholic National Shrine in Belleville, Illinois

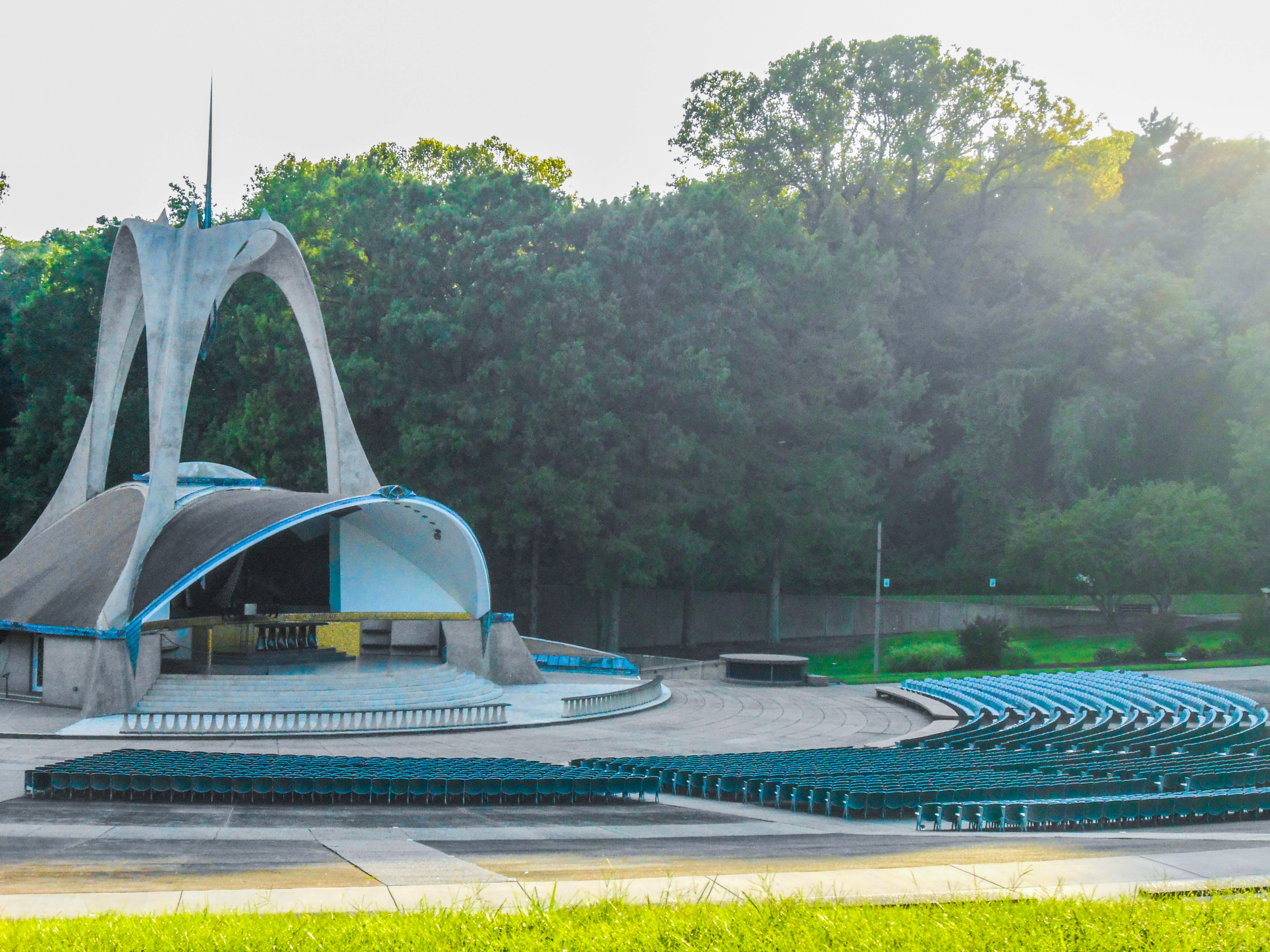
- National Shrine of Our Lady of the Snows
- 38°33′30″N 90°05′17″W
- Location: Belleville, Illinois
- Country: United States
- Denomination: Catholic
- Religious institute: Missionary Oblates of Mary Immaculate
- Website: snows.org

History
- Status: National shrine
- Founded: 1958

The National Shrine of Our Lady of the Snows is a Catholic shrine to the Blessed Virgin Mary in Belleville, Illinois, nine miles southeast of St. Louis, Missouri. The Shrine's director is Father Mike Powell, OMI. The shrine is in the Roman Catholic Diocese of Belleville, but it is operated by the United States Province of the Missionary Oblates of Mary Immaculate. The Shrine name refers to the Basilica of Saint Mary Major in Rome, where legend says snow fell in the summertime.

== History ==
Devotion to Our Lady of the Snows was first introduced to the Midwest in 1941 by missioner Father Paul Schulte, OMI. A small corner shrine was set up in a chapel at St. Henry's seminary in Belleville. In 1943 the Oblates began to hold a novena in honor of Our Lady of the Snows.

The shrine was designed by sculptor William C. Severson and architect Richard Cummings.

Work on the shrine began in 1958 after Schulte had been developing the idea for years. By 1963, the shrine's reflecting pool had already been completed. The pool is lined with bells that were originally cast in Germany from a demolished Chicago church.

== Facilities ==
The shrines’s 200 acre campus includes the King's House Retreat Center, Visitor Center, Gift Shop, a residence for the Oblates and the Benedictine Senior Living Facility. During Advent and Christmas, the Shrine hosts the "Way of Lights", an outdoor light display that features over 1.5 million Christmas lights and attracts over 250,000 visitors annually. Visitors can travel the mile-and-a-half-long "Way of Lights" in their vehicles and stop at the activities on the church parking lot and Visitor Center. From July 28 to August 5th, people from all over the World gather to worship and pray during the Our Lady of the Snows Healing and Hope Novena.

The Shrine also includes Our Lady of the Snows church, Stations of the Cross, a Resurrection Garden, a depiction of the Lourdes Grotto, an Annunciation Garden and a devotional site for Our Lady of Guadalupe.

The Oblates make possible a number of spiritual and family programs for the enrichment of the local community, for the Midwest region, and for North America. The Shrine's Adult Spirituality, Hispanic Ministry, Liturgy, and Retreat Center host a variety of programs year-round, tailored to meet the needs of the Shrine's many pilgrims.

The Shrine Restaurant closed in 2020 as a result of the COVID-19 pandemic and the Banquet Center in 2023 when it transitioned into the King's House Retreat Center.

== See also ==
- Dedication of the Basilica of Saint Mary Major
