= Roberto Jacketti & The Scooters =

Dutch pop group

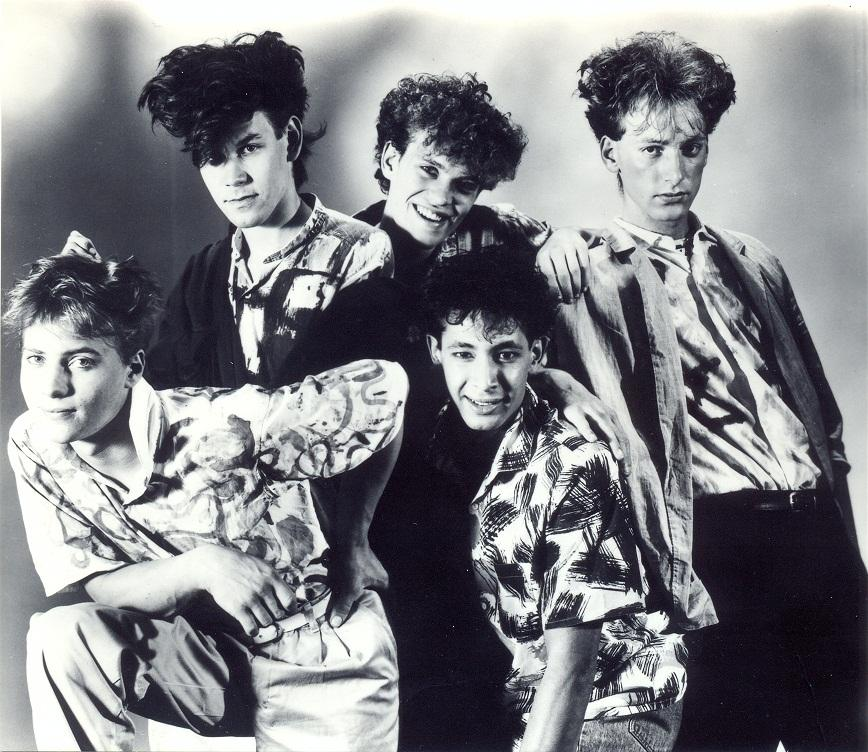
Roberto Jacketti & the Scooters

Roberto Jacketti & The Scooters was a Dutch pop group. Lead singer is Erik van der Hoff, who later became a famous TV host.

== History ==
The band's two biggest hits in the Netherlands were "I Save The Day" as well as "Make Me Cry".
