= Ray Shell =

American actor, author and producer (born 1951)

- Born: Ayries Lancaster; 22 September 1951 (age 74); Wilson County, North Carolina, US
- Other name: Ayries Shell
- Education: Emerson College
- Occupations: Actor, author, producer
- Notable work: Iced (1993)

Ray Shell (born 22 September 1951) is an American film, TV and stage actor, as well as an author, singer, director and producer. He is known for creating the roles of Nomax in Five Guys Named Moe (1990) and Rusty in Starlight Express (1984). He is a Creative Director of the Giant Olive Theatre Company, resident company at the Lion & Unicorn Theatre in Kentish Town, London, England. Shell is the author of the 1993 novel Iced.

== Early life ==
Born in Wilson County, North Carolina, United States, Shell moved with his mother to Brooklyn, New York, when he was two years old; in a 2018 interview, he said: "My name should be Ayries Lancaster because James Lancaster Jr. was my biological father. Charles Shell is the name of my father who adopted me at 13. I named myself Ray because I got tired of people murdering my first name."

In 1970, Shell went to Emerson College in Boston, Massachusetts, where he studied acting, literature and mass communications, graduating with a BFA in 1974.

After graduation, Shell toured in the national companies of Hair and The Me Nobody Knows, before being cast in the title role of "the first soul gospel musical" Little Willie Jr's Resurrection, Oscar L. Johnson and Lon Satton, traveling with the show to London, England, in November 1978.

== Career ==
After arriving in London in 1978 with Little Willie Jr's Resurrection, Shell immediately became part of London's New Wave music scene, recording as a vocalist with Howard Devoto's Magazine, covering Kate Bush's "Them Heavy People". He went on to record with his own band The Street Angels, featuring a "pre-Simon Cowell" Sinitta, Carl McKintosh and Charita Jones.

On the UK stage, Shell originated lead roles in the musicals Starlight Express (1984) and Five Guys Named Moe (1990).

In 1993, Shell's novel Iced was first published by Flamingo/HarperCollins in the UK (Random House in the US), to commercial success. Described in a cover blurb by Maya Angelou as "a powerhouse", Iced tells the story of an upper-middle-class black American man destroying himself with crack-cocaine. In 1997, The Black Theatre Co-operative toured a stage adaptation of the book, in collaboration with the Nottingham Playhouse, including a sell-out run at the Tricycle Theatre.

In 2008, Shell wrote about his appearance in, and the closure of, the musical Gone with the Wind for The Guardian newspaper.

In summer 2011, Shell was the performance coach for Adrian Grant's Respect La Diva starring Sheila Ferguson, Zoe Birkett, Katy Satterfield, Denise Pearson and Andy Abraham. In winter 2011, Shell was James Earl Jones's understudy for the London West End production of Driving Miss Daisy, starring Boyd Gaines and with Vanessa Redgrave in the title role.

In March 2012, Shell's TAIP (Total Artist in Production) produced The Gaddafi Club, a new play. In spring 2012, Shell toured the UK as MC Romeo Marcell in Dancing in the Streets. In 2012, he directed A Dream Across the Ocean, a new British musical produced by Samuel Facey and Dave Prince from ChurchBoyz Entertainment.

Also in 2013, Street Angels Books published Spike Lee: The Eternal Maverick, a biography by Shell. In 2015, Shell began production of the film version of Iced and published Feedin' Miranda, a new novel. He also appeared as Bill Devaney in the newly created West End musical The Bodyguard, based on the movie of the same name. He appeared as The Bishop in the Bush Theatre's 2014 production of Perseverance Drive; Shell also established his popular London TAIP (Total Actor In Production) sessions at the Ripley Grier Studios in New York City.

Shell is also the author of the novels Carolina Red and An Eye, A Tooth.

== Personal life ==
Shell was married to restaurateur Charita "Momma Cherri" Jones; their eldest daughter Katryna Thomas-Shell is an actress and producer, while their youngest daughter Krystin Thomas-Shell Gravitt is married to Zack Gravitt and is a health executive in Houston, Texas. Shell has three grandchildren – Ty McCurdy, Elle Skatch and Eden Ayries Thomas-Shell.

== Credits ==
=== Theatre ===
- Rusty in Starlight Express
- Poppa in The New Starlight Express
- Pork in Gone With the Wind
- Narrator in Dancing in the Streets
- Ain't Misbehavin'
- Jesus Christ Superstar
- Miss Saigon
- Mass Carib
- Little Willies Jr
- Children of Eden
- 125th Street
- The Lion King
- Golden Boy
- Nomax in Five Guys Named Moe
- Sweeney Todd in Sweeney Todd: The Demon Barber of Fleet Street
- Vernon God Little
- Happy End
- Two Trains Running
- Perseverance Drive
- The Barber Shop Chronicles
- Hair
- Driving Miss Daisy
- Bill Devaney in The Bodyguard

=== DVD and video ===
- Andrew Lloyd Webber: The Royal Albert Hall Celebration

=== Film and TV ===
- American Voices as Elmer Thomas
- Too Much Sun as Transvestite (episode: "Cross Purposes)
- Velvet Goldmine as Murray
- Pirate Prince as Darbo
- Young Soul Rebels as Jeff Kane
- Breakfast with Frost as himself
- Screen Two as From the Rear Window (episode: "The McGuffin")
- The Apple as Shake

=== Recordings ===
- Starlight Express: Original London Cast Recording
- Only You
- The Apple
- Andrew Lloyd Webber: The Royal Albert Hall Celebration
- Children of Eden: Original London Cast Recording

=== Contributor ===
- "A Higher Calling" in Encounters with James Baldwin: Celebrating 100 Years.

=== Own work ===
- Iced
- Flatshare
- Frederick Avery Visits
- Street Angels
- ZIP
- The Gaddafi Club
- White Folks
