= Spargo (band) =

Dutch disco pop band

Background information
- Origin: Amsterdam, Netherlands
- Genres: Disco; funk; pop
- Years active: 1975–1985; 1997–present
- Members: Ruud Mulder; Ellert Driessen; Gerald Olieberg; Leander Lammertink
- Past members: Hans Elbersen; Lilian Day Jackson; René van Collem; Jef Nassenstein

Spargo are a Dutch band, formed in 1975, known for their hits "You and Me", "Head Up to the Sky", "One Night Affair", "Just For You" and "Hip Hap Hop" in the 1980s.

== Career ==
Spargo was formed by Mulder, Elbersen (both of whom had played in the blues rock group Space 7), Driessen, Nassenstein and Lammertink. The band was initially called Funkliefhebber Lammertink. Elbersen left the band and in 1979 American singer Lilian Day Jackson, stepdaughter of jazz drummer Art Blakey, joined. With Jackson and Driessen as lead vocalists, the band got its distinctive sound and got its breakthrough. In 1980, the single "You and Me" topped the charts in the Netherlands and also became the best-selling record there in 1980. The single was also very successful across Europe, in Belgium, Germany, Iceland and Sweden. Between August 1980 and March 1982, Spargo achieved four more top-5 hits in the Netherlands, but the success of "You and Me" was not to be equalled.

Between October 1982 and March 1984, the band achieved a further 4 top-40 hits, but none were as successful as their previous singles.

Jackson and Lammertink quit the band at the end of 1983. The drummer was replaced by René van Collem, previously in Doe Maar, and a new album Step by Step was recorded. The first single, "Lady", was the band's last hit single until 1997. After becoming less successful and their music having apparently fallen out of favour, the band called it quits in 1985.

=== Reunions ===
In 1997, the band reformed with Jackson's brother Larry joining the line-up on percussion, in order to record a new single "Indestructible" for a compilation CD. The band also recorded another song "Make a New Start", which was also included on the compilation. This was followed by live and television performances, including a one-off broadcast of TopPop.

At the end of 2015, the band, joined by Larry Jackson and Driessen's son Joao (on saxophone and keyboards) gave a full line-up mini-concert during Humberto Tan's Let's Dance event in a sold-out Ziggo-Dome in Amsterdam.

In June 2017, the band performed at the 40-UP Festivals at the Red Light Jazz festival in Amsterdam.

In 2018, Driessen's daughter Jazzi Bobbi remixed the band's biggest hit "You and Me" which was featured in a Vodafone TV advert.

In April 2023, the band's lead singer, Lilian Day Jackson, died at the age of 63.

== Members ==
=== Current members ===
- Ruud Mulder – guitar, vocals
- Ellert Driessen – lead vocals, keyboards
- Gerald Olieberg – bass
- Leander Lammertink – drums

=== Past members ===
- Hans Elbersen – guitar, vocals
- René van Collem – drums
- Jef Nassenstein – bass, vocals
- Lilian Day Jackson – lead vocals, percussion

== Discography ==
=== Albums ===
- Good Time Spirit (1980) – NL #17
- Go (1981) – NL #14
- Hold On (1982)
- Step by Step (1984)
- Best of Spargo (1990)
- Indestructible – The Singles Collection (1997) – NL #27
- Just for Me and You – The Greatest Hits Collection (2019)

=== Singles ===
Year	Single	Peak chart positions							
Year	Single	BE (FLA)	GER	ICE	IT	NL 40	NL 100	SPA	SWE
1980	"You and Me"	1	14	1	2	1	1	5	16
1980	"Head Up to the Sky"	13	61	—	—	5	8	—	—
1980	"Sometimes"	—	—	—	—	23	20	—	—
1981	"One Night Affair"	8	68	5	15	4	5	12	—
1981	"Just for You"	10	29	—	21	5	7	—	—
1982	"Hip Hap Hop"	6	15	—	—	5	6	—	—
1982	"Hey You" (Spain-only release)	—	—	—	—	—	—	—	—
1982	"So Funny"	31	36	—	—	29	29	—	—
1982	"Goodbye"	—	—	—	—	29	29	—	—
1983	"Do You Like Me"	—	—	—	—	26	26	—	—
1983	"Groovy People"	—	—	—	—	—	—	—	—
1983	"Love and True Love" (Japan-only release)	—	—	—	—	—	—	—	—
1984	"Lady"	26	—	—	—	15	17	—	—
1984	"I'm in Love"	—	—	—	—	—	—	—	—
1984	"Oh No!"	—	—	—	—	—	—	—	—
1997	"Indestructible"	—	—	—	—	—	74	—	—
"—" denotes releases that did not chart or were not released
