= Lorin Dreyfuss =

American film producer

Lorin Dreyfuss (December 4, 1944 – 2021) was an American actor, film producer, and screenwriter. He was the older brother of actor Richard Dreyfuss and sister Cathy Dreyfuss. His son is Justin Dreyfuss. His daughters are Allyson Dreyfuss and actress Natalie Dreyfuss. His nephews are actor and journalist Ben Dreyfuss and Harry Dreyfuss, and his niece is journalist Emily Dreyfuss. His family is Jewish.

== Filmography ==
| Year | Title | Role | Notes |
|---|---|---|---|
| 1979 | Skatetown, U.S.A. | N/A | Producer, writer |
| 1982–1983 | Fantasy Island | N/A | Writer (2 episodes) |
| 1983 | Reggie | N/A | Writer (episode: "The Seduction of Reggie") |
| 1986 | Detective School Dropouts | Paul Miller | Also writer |
| 1987 | Dutch Treat | Norm | Also writer |
| 1988 | Moon over Parador | First Dictator | |
| 1989 | Let It Ride | Grandstand Person | |
| 1992 | Batman: The Animated Series | Salvo Smith (voice) | Episode: "The Forgotten" |
| 1997 | Superman: The Animated Series | Ben Mardon (voice) | Episode: "Speed Demons" |
| 1998 | The Angry Beavers | Leonard Beaver (voice) | Episode: "If You In-Sisters" |
| 2000 | Clerks: The Animated Series | Old Jay (voice) | Episode: "The Clipshow Wherein Dante and Randal Are Locked in the Freezer and Remember Some of the Great Moments in Their Lives" |
| 2000 | Whatever | N/A | Producer |
| 2009 | My Life in Ruins | Irv's Double | Credited as Loryn Dreyfuss |
