= Ria Brieffies =

Dutch singer (1957–2009)

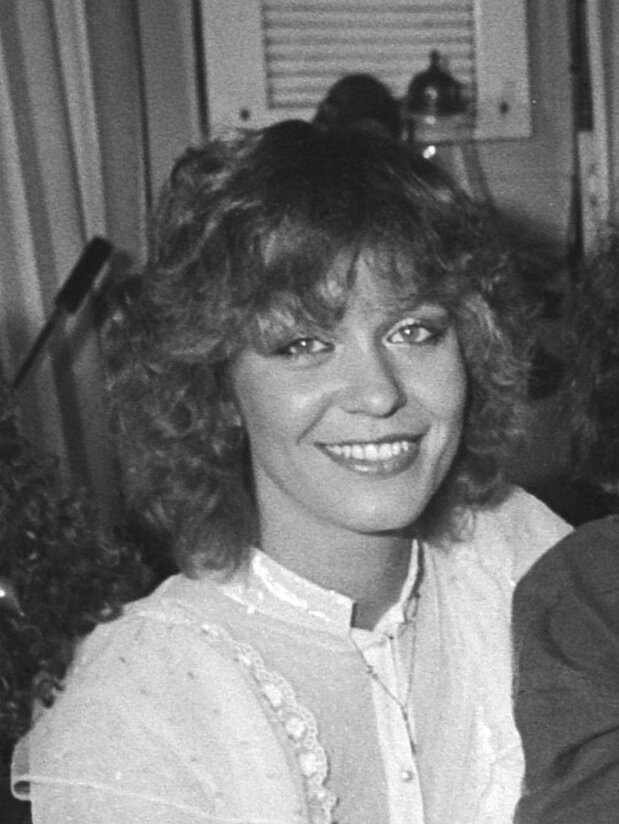

Background information
- Born: Maria Petronella Brieffies; 23 February 1957; Lutjebroek, Netherlands
- Died: 20 July 2009 (aged 52) Westerland, Netherlands
- Genres: Girl group, jazz
- Occupation: Singer
- Years active: 1979–1988; 2007 (comeback)
- Formerly of: Dolly Dots
- Website: riabrieffies.com

Maria Petronella "Ria" Brieffies (23 February 1957 – 20 July 2009) was a Dutch singer, best known as a member of 1980s girl group "Dolly Dots".

== Life ==
After leaving school, Brieffies trained as a medical assistant. In her spare time she sang in various bands, including the VIPs. In 1979 she joined the newly formed girl group Dolly Dots, who went on to become one of the most popular groups of the 1980s in the Netherlands. The band also enjoyed some success in Germany and Belgium. The single "Love Me Just a Little Bit More", featuring Brieffies on lead vocals, topped the Dutch singles chart for one week in 1984.

== Solo career ==
Brieffies was generally regarded as Dolly Dots' most accomplished singer. After the group split up in 1988, she continued her career as a solo singer. In 1989 she recorded "Love Always Finds a Reason", a duet with American singer Glenn Medeiros which reached the Dutch top 20. She later performed with her own jazz group, the Ria Brieffies Kwintet.

In the 1990s Brieffies retired from the music industry and became a qualified manicurist/pedicurist, before reuniting with the Dolly Dots in 2007 for a comeback tour which included three concerts to sell-out audiences of 10,000 at the Ahoy Arena in Rotterdam.

== Illness and death ==
Ria Brieffies was diagnosed with lung cancer in November 2008 and died on 20 July 2009, aged 52.
