= David De Silva =

American film writer and producer

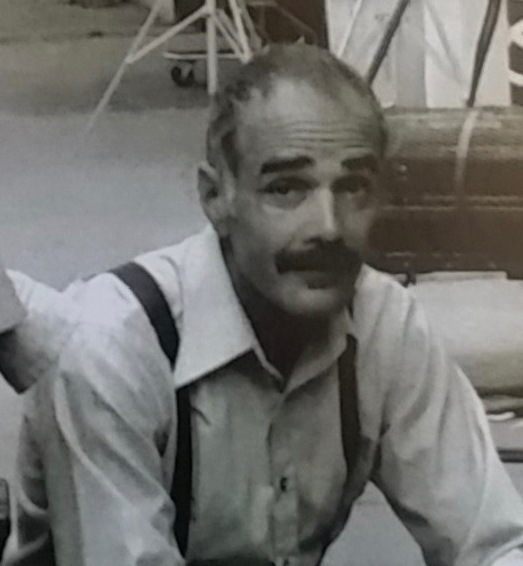
- De Silva in 1979
- Born: August 14, 1936 (age 90); New York City, New York, U.S.
- Education: Queens College, City University of New York
- Occupations: Film writer Producer

David De Silva (born August 14, 1936) is an American film writer and producer, best known for the 1980 MGM movie Fame. De Silva retained the stage rights to the film, and, conceived and developed Fame - The Musical, which has since been produced in many countries around the world, leading De Silva to be known as "Father Fame", and launching a foundation called the Father Fame Foundation to promote theatre arts.

== Early life and education ==
De Silva was born in New York City on August 14, 1936, and attended school in the Bronx and Queens. In 1957, he graduated from Queens College with a major in history. However, he had a keen interest in theatre and began studying with Stella Adler.

== Early career ==
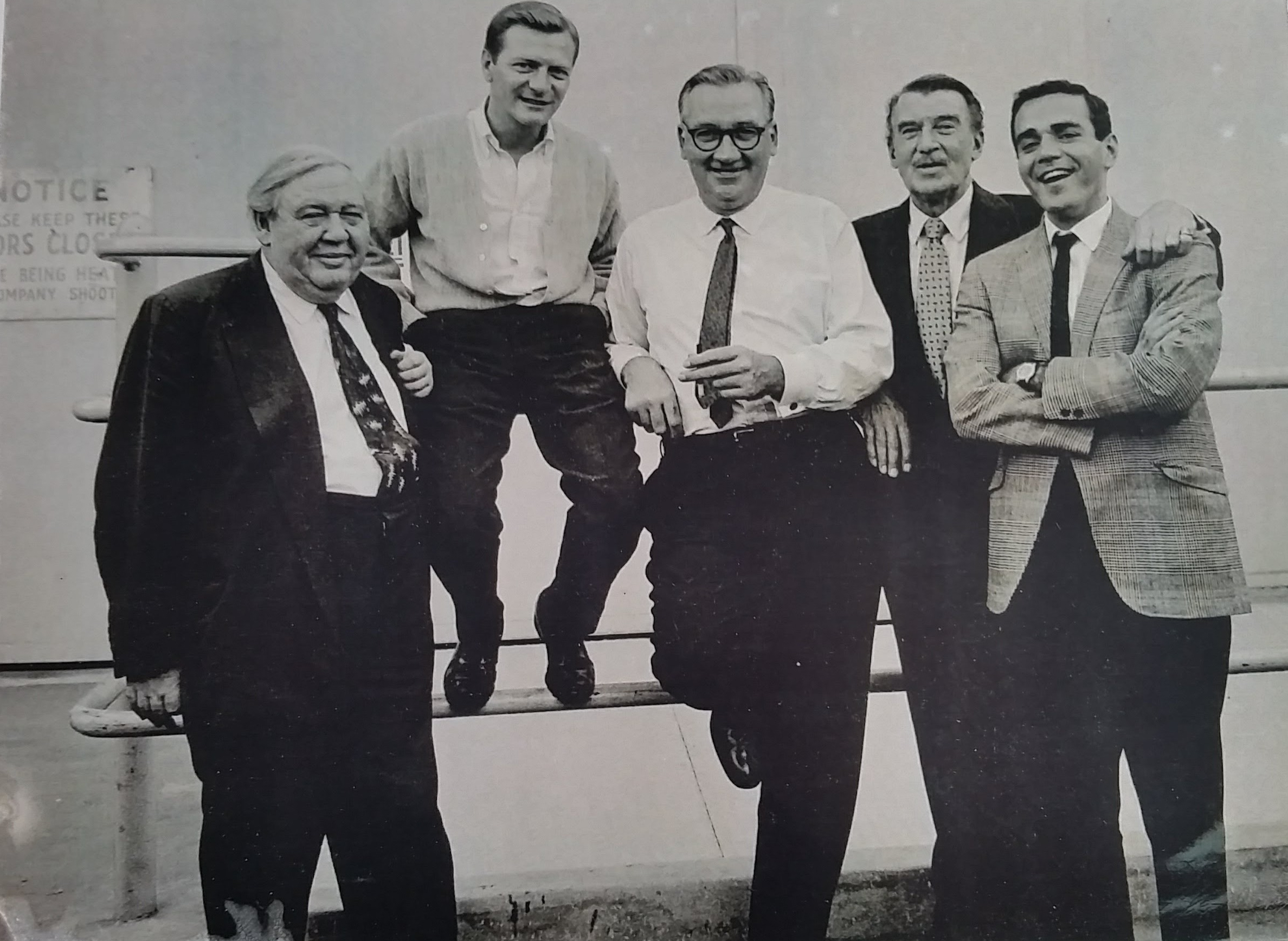
On the set of Advise & Consent in 1961

For three seasons of Summer Stock, he was an apprentice actor at the Hampton Playhouse in Hampton, New Hampshire, before moving to Los Angeles, where he took supporting roles in TV shows including Bachelor Father. In 1961 he was hired as assistant to director Otto Preminger on the film Advise & Consent. His work with Preminger led him to work with Martin Baum, Head of Talent at General Artists Corporation, a major Hollywood talent agency at the time. In the early 1970s, he worked as a talent agent for Ashley-Famous and ICM, followed by several years as a personal manager managing such actors as Jerry Orbach and Inga Swenson.

== Fame ==
In 1976, De Silva began working on a project based on the lives of students at the New York High School of Performing Arts. Screenwriter Christopher Gore said that he was inspired to write Fame after "seeing a performance of A Chorus Line and hearing one of the characters speak about attending the High School of Performing Arts." and according to director Alan Parker, De Silva had the idea for the project after attending a stage production of the same play and hearing a reference to the school in the song "Nothing", though De Silva himself disputes this account. In 1977, De Silva met playwright Christopher Gore in Fort Lauderdale, Florida. He paid Gore $5,000 to work with him on a draft script titled Hot Lunch, and provided ideas for characters and the structure of the story, following the characters from the audition stage through to graduation from the school. De Silva and Gore later signed with the Creative Artists Agency to sell it. The script became the subject of a bidding war among a host of established film studios before De Silva took the project to Metro-Goldwyn-Mayer (MGM), which acquired the script for $400,000, and gave De Silva a list of ten directors they would approve for the project, from which he chose Alan Parker.

Hot Lunch was among several scripts sent to Alan Parker following the release of his previous film Midnight Express (1978). Parker signed on as its director in February 1979, and after meeting with De Silva in Manhattan, New York, it was decided that Parker would draft his own script with Gore receiving sole screenwriting credit and Parker's colleague Alan Marshall being enlisted as a producer. The new script for Hot Lunch became significantly darker than what De Silva had originally intended. De Silva said, "I was really motivated and interested in the joy of what the school represented for these kids, and [Parker] was really much more interested in where the pain was in going to the school, and so we had our little conflicts based on that area." During filming De Silva and Parker received a note from MGM that there was a pornographic film titled Hot Lunch, and as a result the film was renamed Fame. The film was released in 1980.

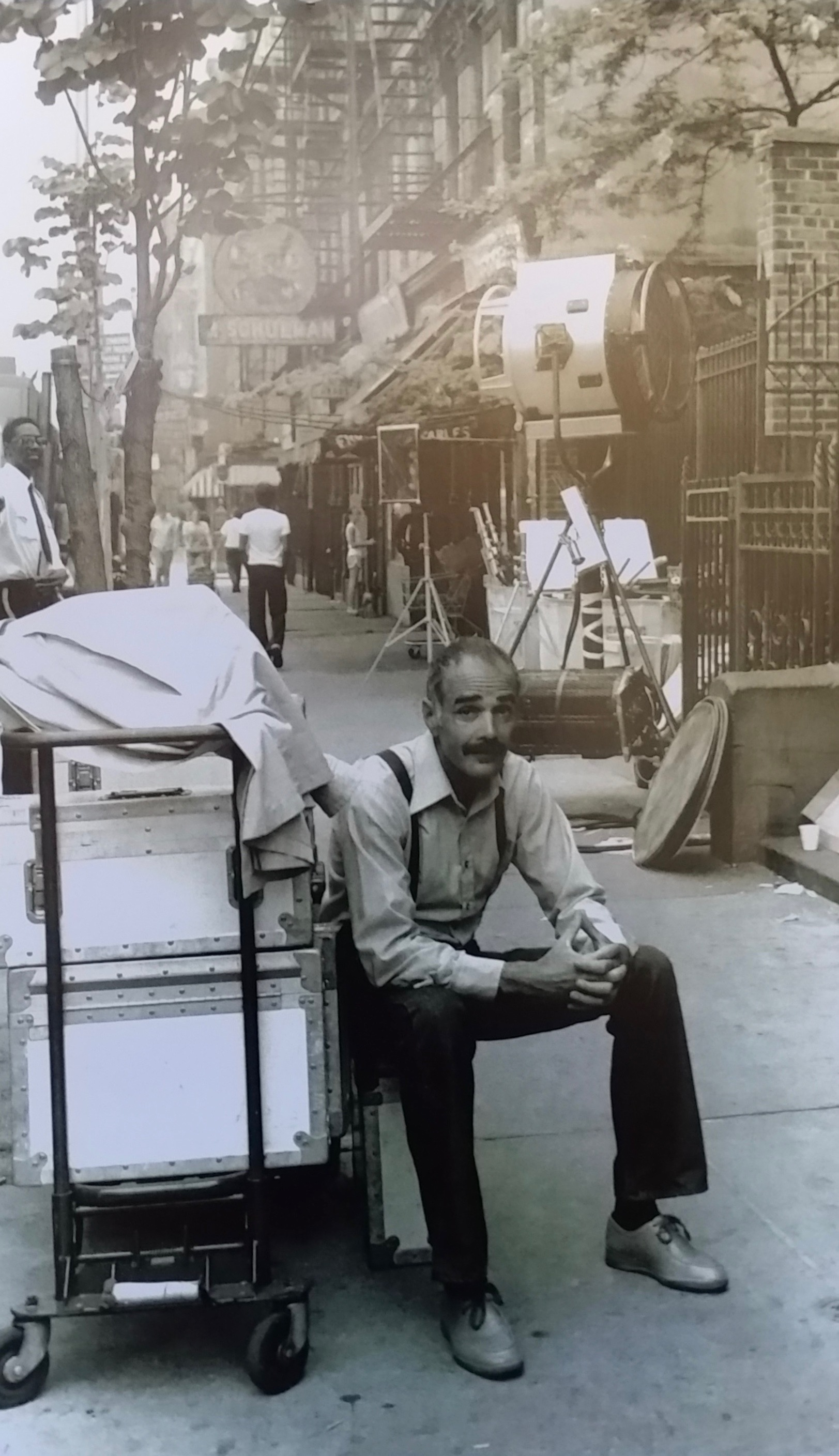
On 46th St during FAME Filming, David De Silva (Producer) NYC Summer 1979

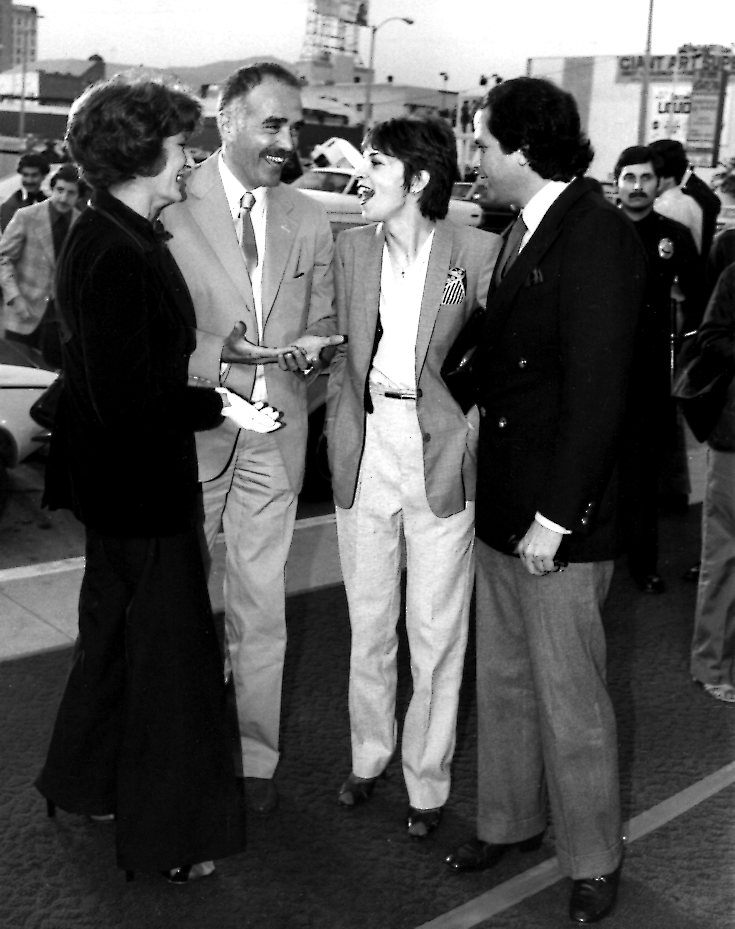
Opening Night of the film, FAME (L.A. May,1980) Dolores Quinton, Producer David De Silva, Cindy Williams & Jim Schreiber in front of the theater.

Having retained the stage rights to the movie, in 1987 it was announced that De Silva was developing a stage version of the film. With a book by José Fernandez, music by Steve Margoshes and lyrics by Jacques Levy, Fame – the Musical was the first professional production at the Coconut Grove Playhouse in Miami, Florida, in 1988. The show then ran at the Walnut Street Theatre in Philadelphia, Pennsylvania, from March 25, through April 29, 1989. A Swedish version opened at the China Theater in Stockholm in 1993, and the show opened at the Cambridge Theatre in London in 1995. Fame - The Musical was the first stage production in the history of London's West End to open seven productions within one decade. The musical has since had productions in more than 25 countries.

== Talent Springs Eternal ==
De Silva subsequently conceived and developed a new musical play entitled Fame Forever: Talent Springs Eternal. It was first performed by Glasgow's Apollo Players at the Kings Theatre in 2007. The American debut of the sequel, under the title Fame Forever - Talent Springs Eternal (formerly Reunion and Rebirth) played from September 21–30, 2007, at the Waterville Opera House, Waterville, Maine, and also received a co-debut at The Players of Sarasota in Sarasota, Florida, opening around the same time, and running to October 7, 2007. This show was directed by Thomas DeWayne Barrett. The English premiere was produced at the Congress Theatre, Eastbourne, by a local group called The Rattonians, also in 2007. Nashville's The Circle Players produced Fame Forever in 2011.

The first professional cast recording of Fame Forever... was produced by the Father Fame Foundation in 2013. In 2014 Music Theatre International (MTI) republished the show with the title Talent Springs Eternal: Fame Forever. An audio book, Talent Springs Eternal (Fame Forever), a production with 25 actors and singers, was conceived, directed and produced by De Silva and released on Audible/Amazon in June 2016. It was recorded at PPI Recording Studio in SoHo, New York City, with sound engineer Chip Fabrizi.
