= Isaac Mizrahi =

American fashion designer and television presenter (born 1961)

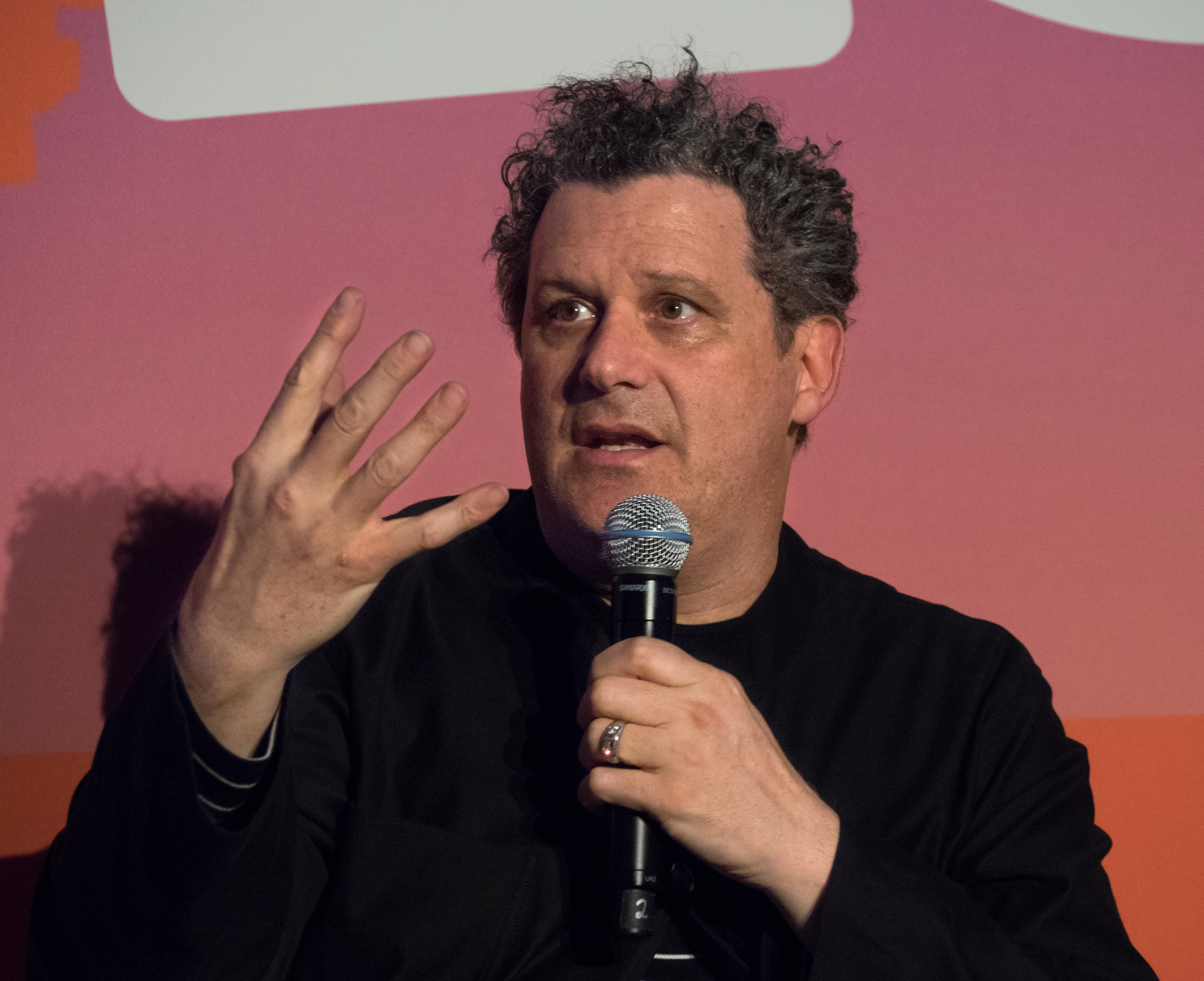
- Mizrahi in July 2018
- Born: October 14, 1961 (age 64); Brooklyn, New York City, U.S.
- Occupations: Fashion designer, actor, singer
- Labels: Isaac Mizrahi New York; Isaac Mizrahi; Isaac Mizrahi Jeans; Isaac Mizrahi Fabulous; IsaacMizrahiLIVE!
- Spouse: Arnold Germer (m. 2011)
- Awards: CFDA: Womenswear Designer of the Year (1989 and 1991); Drama Desk Award for Outstanding Costume Design (2002)
- Website: www.isaacmizrahi.com

Isaac Mizrahi (born October 14, 1961) is an American fashion designer, actor, singer, television presenter and chief designer of the Isaac Mizrahi brand for Xcel Brands. Based in New York City, he is best known for his eponymous fashion lines. Mizrahi was previously a judge on Project Runway All Stars. In 2022, he played Amos Hart in the long-running Broadway revival of Chicago.

== Early life ==
Mizrahi was born in Brooklyn, the son of Sarah and Zeke Mizrahi, who was a children's clothing manufacturer. He is of Syrian-Jewish descent. His maternal grandparents were Jews from Aleppo, Syria. He grew up as the youngest boy of his family in Midwood, Brooklyn. He bought his first sewing machine at the age of ten with money he had saved from babysitting that summer.

Mizrahi attended the High School of Performing Arts in Manhattan as a drama major. In 1980, when he was an 18-year-old senior at the school, he auditioned for the role of Montgomery in the Alan Parker-directed 1980 teen musical drama film Fame, which chronicled the lives and hardships of students attending the High School of Performing Arts. Classmates Laura Dean, Gene Anthony Ray and Antonia Franceschi were cast in prominent roles in the film. Although he didn't receive the role, Parker cast him in a minor role as the character Touchstone.

== Fashion career ==
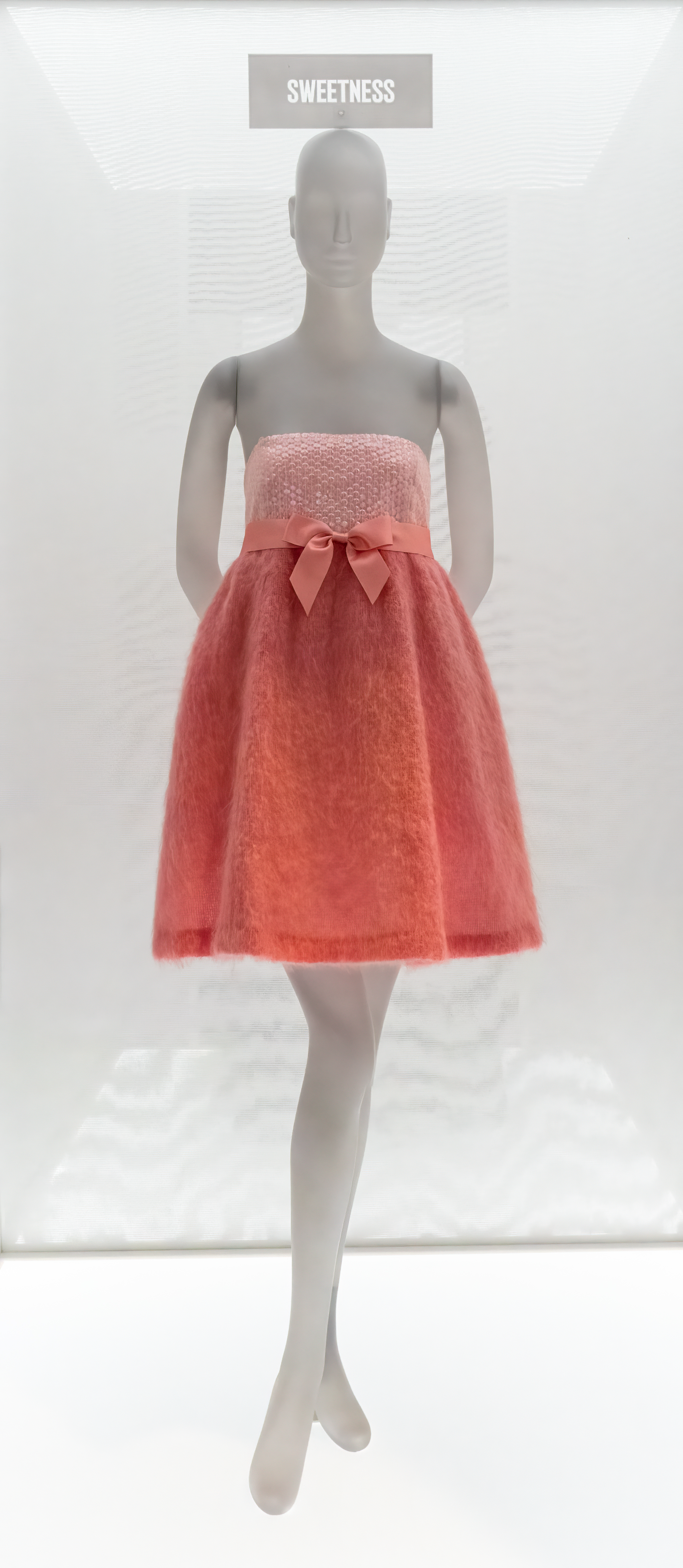
A dress Mizrahi designed in 1994-95 in the Metropolitan Museum of Art exhibition, In America: A Lexicon of Fashion

Mizrahi presented his first collection in 1987 at a trunk show held by New York department store Bergdorf Goodman. The line immediately earned praise from fashion editors, prompting several top retailers to place orders. In 1989, he discussed his designs in an interview with Elizabeth Cannon. He described them as "controlled and glamorous", "elegant", "distilled, refined", inspired by decadence, and by the diversity of New York City. He also expressed his interest in appealing to a refined and exclusive clientele. In 1992, the French fashion house Chanel bought a stake in the company and began to bankroll its operations. Despite continued critical acclaim, sales were inconsistent; Bloomingdale's executive Kal Ruttenstein stated that Mizrahi had "good years and bad years." This volatility is mainly attributed to the designer's failure to establish a defined aesthetic or "Mizrahi look", as the frenetic designer was famed for changing gears each season. Though the company grossed $10–20 million a year, it never made a profit, and lost substantial amounts in its final four years of operation. Chanel eventually tired of the mounting losses and pulled financing in October 1998, forcing the closure of the company after the Fall 1998 collection. Among Mizrahi's fans and clients were Hollywood stars Nicole Kidman, Selma Blair, Julia Roberts, Sarah Jessica Parker, Debra Messing and Natalie Portman.

From 1995 to 1997, Mizrahi also designed a diffusion line, named "IS**C" in an act of "name effacement" intended to prevent dilution of the designer's full name. This lower-priced line (in the $275 to $850 range) was meant to diversify the label from the very expensive Isaac Mizrahi collection, but it failed to gain traction and was shuttered in 1997.

Mizrahi returned to fashion in 2002 with the launch of Isaac Mizrahi for Target, a diffusion line that became a major commercial success. The collection eventually expanded to include accessories, bedding, housewares, and pet products. Over five years, sales tripled to more than $300 million, establishing Mizrahi as a household name. The Target line was discontinued in 2008 when Mizrahi departed to design for Liz Claiborne. At the time, Liz Claiborne—a brand founded in 1976—was struggling. After Mizrahi's contract with Target expired, Liz Claiborne outbid the retailer for his services, hoping he could reinvigorate the brand. However, the partnership lasted only one year.

The 2009 collection, rebranded as Liz Claiborne New York, was sold in national department stores such as Macy's, Belk, and Dillard's, as in previous years. The Liz Claiborne logo was also redesigned. Mizrahi's Spring/Summer 2009 collection debuted in January, followed by his Fall 2009 collection in April, and a Holiday line later that year. Advertising campaigns for the spring and fall collections featured Mizrahi alongside women of various sizes, races, and ages, and appeared in major fashion magazines.

Despite these efforts, the line sold poorly. The weak performance was attributed primarily to the economic downturn and strategic missteps made before Mizrahi's arrival. His bold use of color and playful aesthetic may also have clashed with Liz Claiborne's more conservative customer base. In late 2009, the Liz Claiborne brand was licensed to J.C. Penney—which had carried the Liz&Co. diffusion line since 2007—and was later acquired by the retailer. Mizrahi does not design the J.C. Penney version of the brand. His Liz Claiborne New York collection was moved to QVC, where it remained until his contract ended in December 2016.

In 2010, Mizrahi launched a label called IsaacMizrahiLIVE! exclusively on QVC.

In 2011, Mizrahi sold his brand to Xcel Brands, Inc. In addition to continuing the IsaacMizrahiLIVE! business on QVC, Xcel Brands launched various categories under the Isaac Mizrahi New York, Isaac Mizrahi Jeans, and Isaac Mizrahi brands. As of August 2012, footwear and denim have launched in Bloomingdale's and Nordstrom, and Mizrahi's first-ever fragrance, Fabulous, was set to debut September 6 on QVC, and in Bloomingdale's in October. Mizrahi remained a shareholder, creative director, and media personality for his namesake brand under Xcel.

== Media ==
Mizrahi has made appearances in numerous television shows and movies since the 1990s. Including the 1993 Michael J. Fox comedy, For Love or Money, as an up-and-coming fashion designer, Julian Russell. In 1995, a movie was released about the development of his Fall 1994 collection called Unzipped. In Fall 2005, the Isaac show debuted on Style Network. He previously had a show on the Oxygen network.

Mizrahi appears on many of E!'s programs and has become well known for being flamboyant. He also appeared as himself in the episode "Plus One is the Loneliest Number" of the fifth season of Sex and the City, and in an episode of Spin City. He guest starred on the American dramedy series Ugly Betty, in which he played a reporter for the cable channel Fashion TV in the episode "Lose the Boss". He appeared as himself in The Apprentice season 1 (episode 6) as one of the celebrities supporting an auction for the Elizabeth Glaser Pediatric AIDS Foundation. He also appeared on the public radio game show Wait Wait... Don't Tell Me! in 2006, saying, "Fat is the new black". He also appeared in a Season 4 episode of Gossip Girl.

Mizrahi has stated that he sees himself as an entertainer who can sing and act. On his Oxygen show, he sang jazz in a nightclub. He has also acted in films, appearing in Woody Allen's Small Time Crooks, Hollywood Ending and Celebrity.

Mizrahi was a contestant in the Jeopardy! Million Dollar Celebrity Invitational. While initially finishing second in a quarter-final game to Jane Curtin, as the highest scoring non-qualifier, he replaced semi-finalist Andy Richter, who had to drop out due to scheduling conflicts. He eventually lost to Michael McKean.

In 2006, Mizrahi designed pro bono the Smithsonian American Art Museum and the National Portrait Gallery's conservators' denim work aprons.

In 2009, Mizrahi began co-hosting the first season of The Fashion Show on Bravo with singer Kelly Rowland. Bravo launched the series to replace its former hit Project Runway, which then moved to the Lifetime network. Mizrahi returned as co-host in November 2010 for the show's second season, opposite a close friend and colleague, supermodel Iman, who previously hosted the Canadian version of Project Runway. A representative of the network indicated that Bravo believed Mizrahi's exciting presenting style would work well with newcomer Iman and the credibility that she brought as a genuine pioneer in the fashion world.

In 2012, Mizrahi participated in the debut season of Project Runway: All Stars as a head judge, alongside Marchesa designer Georgina Chapman, which aired on the Lifetime TV Network.

In February 2012, Mizrahi served as red carpet correspondent for Live with Kelly during the 84th Annual Academy Awards. The segment included interviews with Brad Pitt, Emma Stone, Rooney Mara, and Gwyneth Paltrow. It aired the morning after the Oscars, during a special episode of Live with Kelly.

In 2013, Mizrahi played himself in the final season of Showtime's The Big C.

=== Red carpet controversy ===
In January 2006, Mizrahi provoked a flurry of controversy when he touched actress Scarlett Johansson's breast while conducting a live interview for E! on the red carpet at that year's Golden Globes. Johansson expressed consternation, saying she was "sort of shocked", but wasn't angry with Mizrahi. She ascribed the incident to Mizrahi's desire for publicity, and told the Los Angeles Times, "...people made a huge deal out of something that, in the moment, was not as exciting as it seemed afterward." In a 2013 interview on George Stroumboulopoulos Tonight, Mizrahi minimized the incident, saying: "This wasn't nasty ... This was like, 'Are you wearing a bra? Are you wearing an underwire bra?' And she was like, 'Oh well.' "

== Costume design ==
Mizrahi has worked as the costume designer for three Broadway revivals, including two plays (The Women (2001) and Barefoot in the Park (2006)), and Bertolt Brecht and Kurt Weill's play with music The Threepenny Opera in 2006.

For his work on The Women, Mizrahi won the 2002 Drama Desk Award for Outstanding Costume Design.

Mizrahi was the costume designer for the Metropolitan Opera production of Orfeo ed Euridice (2008), directed by Mark Morris. Mizrahi has been a longtime collaborator with Morris in a partnership dating from 1997, when Mizrahi created costumes for a Morris film project with Yo-Yo Ma, Falling Down Stairs, from Ma's Inspired By Bach series.

== Other projects ==
- He made a series of comic books called Isaac Mizrahi Presents the Adventures of Sandee the Supermodel, published by Simon & Schuster.
- He has also narrated the children's classic Peter and the Wolf at the Guggenheim Museum's Works & Process performing arts series since December 2007.
- In 2008 he published How to Have Style (Gotham, ISBN 978-1-59240-392-9)
- In 2010, he designed the sets and costumes and directed Stephen Sondheim's A Little Night Music for Opera Theatre of St. Louis. It has been announced that in 2014, he designed and directed Mozart's The Magic Flute for Opera Theatre of St. Louis.
- In 2013 Johnson & Johnson released a series of Band-Aid adhesive bandages with an Isaac Mizrahi theme.
- In 2016, Isaac Mizrahi: An Unruly History, Mizrahi's first career retrospective exhibition, opened at The Jewish Museum, New York. It was organized by Chee Pearlman, Guest Curator and Kelly Taxter, The Jewish Museum's Barnett and Annalee Newman Curator of Contemporary Art.Isaac Mizrahi: An Unruly History was on view from March 18 to August 7, and accompanied by a catalog published by Yale University Press, featuring essays by Kelly Taxter, Lynn Yaeger, and Ulrich Lehman, with an introduction by Chee Pearlman.
- In 2019 he published his memoir, IM, (Flatiron Books, ISBN 978-1-250-07408-9)

== Personal life ==
Mizrahi married his partner of six years, Arnold Germer, in a civil ceremony in New York City Hall on November 30, 2011.

== In popular culture ==
He appears briefly in the film Men in Black (1997) as one of the "celebrity aliens" granted asylum on Earth.

In 1996, an early MTV prank show, Buzzkill, used an actor to impersonate Mizrahi.

Mizrahi was a guest caller on an episode of Frasier and as himself in Sex and the City (Season 5, episode 5).

He appeared on Gossip Girl (Season 4, episode 6) as himself. He is seen at a party talking to Lily van der Woodsen.

In 2004, he appeared on an episode of The Apprentice during a challenge meant to raise money for the Elizabeth Glaser Pediatric AIDS Foundation.

He appeared in the fourth and final season of The Big C as himself.

He appeared on the QVC Shopping Channel in 2015 and proclaimed that Earth's Moon was in fact a planet. His co-host at the time, Shawn Killinger, vehemently denied this assertion and proclaimed that "the Moon is a star".

In 2018, Mizrahi was mentioned in episode 212, "Kiss and Tell," of Modern Family when Cam claims that he dismissed a sexual advance by Mizrahi prior to dating Mitchell.

In January 2024, Mizrahi appeared as a guest judge on the sixteenth season of RuPaul's Drag Race.

In 2025, he was a consulting producer on Hulu's sitcom Mid-Century Modern, which stars Nathan Lane, Matt Bomer, Nathan Lee Graham and Linda Lavin.

== See also ==
- List of Jewish Americans
- LGBTQ culture in New York City
- List of LGBTQ people from New York City
