= Fame (2003 TV series) =

- Genre: Interactive talent show Reality show
- Directed by: Jeff Margolis
- Presented by: Debbie Allen; Joey Fatone
- Judges: Carnie Wilson; Johnny Wright; JoJo Wright
- Country of origin: United States
- Original language: English

Production
- Running time: 60 minutes
- Production company: MGM Television

Original release
- Network: NBC
- Release: May 28, 2003

Fame is an American reality television competition series that ran on NBC in the summer of 2003. The show was essentially NBC's attempt to duplicate the success of mega-hit American Idol, right down to their selection of judges. Former pop star Carnie Wilson was similar in her judgements to American Idol's Paula Abdul, Johnny Wright, the veteran music producer, was the show's analogue of Randy Jackson, and JoJo Wright was, like Simon Cowell, the judge who says things to stir people up. The show retained the original Fame theme music (with a new vocal), as well as producer Debbie Allen. *NSYNC alumnus Joey Fatone was the official host of the show, but Allen also made frequent appearances.

The show was based on the Italian show Amici, where young talented dancers, singers and actors attended a school to become triple threat performers. The series used the title and imagery of MGM's 1980 film Fame (also about a school of budding triple threat performers) to give the show familiarity utilizing that trademark to American audiences. While Amici has continued into the 2020s, the reality version of Fame in the United States, like most Idol competitors of the 2000s, lasted only a single season.

== Voting methods ==
In the initial rounds, the producers and judges chose which performers would stay or go, with the final dozen or so performances surviving based on the recommendations of the judges as well as phone votes from fans. Unlike American Idol, where one viewer could call up to thousands of times in a 2-hour window, Fame limited the number of votes to five per phone number.

== Criticism ==
Although the Fame premiere did well in the ratings, it was criticized for several choices. Unlike Idol, where the producers had absolutely no connection to any performers before the auditions, Allen personally knew and had worked with a number of those who made it to the final rounds.

In the middle of the season, the show announced they would bring in a "spoiler", a new finalist who could make it to the last round if the public enjoyed their work. They asked viewers to send in audition tapes by July 1. On July 2, they announced the winner - Tyce Keith Diorio. Diorio was introduced on the show as a mere dance instructor, but his actual credits included being a former backup dancer for Fatone's NSYNC, Paula Abdul, Janet Jackson, Ricky Martin, Jennifer Lopez, and dancing in an Academy Awards piece choreographed by Debbie Allen, raising the suspicion of those who auditioned as the spoiler that the work they put into their audition tapes was completely in naught and the 'competition' for that slot was fixed. The twist in the end did not affect the full contest, as the audience vote saw Diorio eliminated in the next episode.

=== Dropping ratings ===
Unlike American Idol, which focused on singing, or Star Search, which divided talent up into several categories, Fame sought a "triple threat", someone who could dance, sing, and have star quality. In the eyes of many viewers, most of the finalists had shockingly poor singing abilities, and so much emphasis was placed on dance numbers that their voices never improved. Viewer reaction quickly gave way to apathy and the ratings fell considerably.

== Finalists ==
The final two performers were Shannon Bex and Harlemm Lee. Lee himself was not without controversy, as he had lied about his age (even though there was no age limit on the show) and his short-lived 1980s musical career as Gerry Woo. However, he dazzled viewers with his campy performances of such songs as Oleta Adams' "Get Here", and they deemed him the true "triple threat." Lee's prizes included a record deal, a starring role in the off-Broadway play Fame on 42nd Street, and a free year-long hotel stay. Lee's record, Introducing Harlemm Lee was barely promoted and quickly flopped, he did not appear in the play (the producers cited a scheduling conflict), and by summer 2004 he told fans if not for unemployment checks and the free hotel stay, he would have been penniless and homeless. In spite of the shabby treatment, Lee said he had no hard feelings. In 2005, Bex became a member of the successful girl group Danity Kane until their split in 2009.
