= Jacqueline Kennedy Onassis High School for International Careers =

Public school in New York City

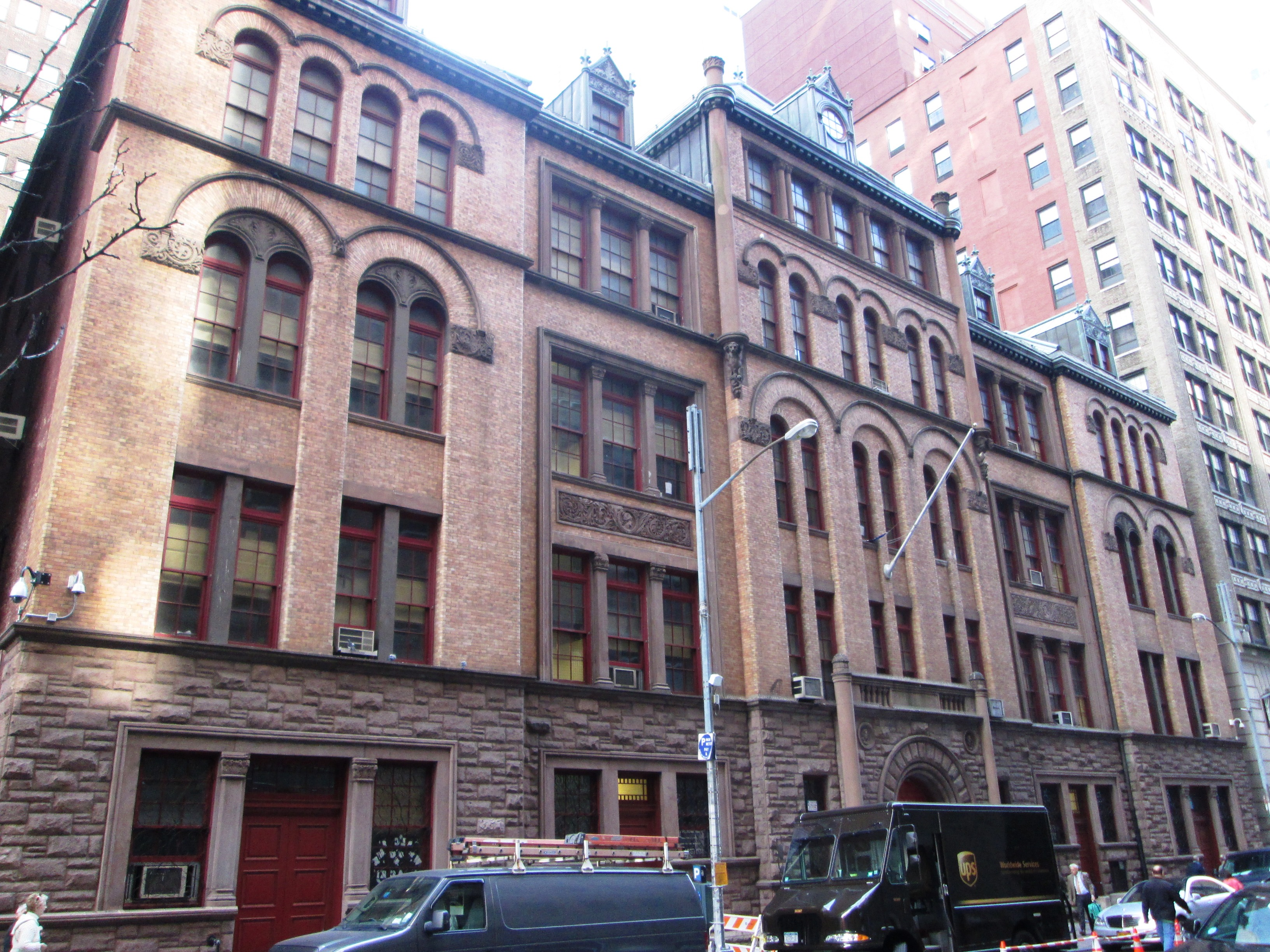
- The school building in October 2013

Location
- 120 West 46th Street, New York, New York; United States; 40°45′27.7″N 73°59′00″W

The Jacqueline Kennedy Onassis High School for International Careers is a public high school located at 120 West 46th Street in the Times Square neighborhood of Manhattan, New York City. It was established in the 1970s in Lower Manhattan as an all-girls annex to Murry Bergtraum High School. Its original goal was to offer young women a business education, then not readily available to female students; however, it is now co-ed. The school was renamed in honor of former First Lady Jacqueline Kennedy Onassis in 1995, a year after her death. It is a part of the New York City Department of Education (NYCDOE).

The building now occupied by the school was formerly the location of Performing Arts High School, the school on which the 1980 film Fame was based. In winter 1988, the vacant building caught fire during renovation. Its facade and several exterior walls survived; the interior needed complete reconstruction. Performing Arts High School moved to LaGuardia High School, and the 46th Street building reopened in 1995 as the Jacqueline Kennedy Onassis High School.

The primary programs offered by the school include international business studies, virtual enterprise, hospitality and tourism, accounting, drama, and dance.
