= Fame (musical) =

Musical

- The Musical
- Show logo
- Music: Steve Margoshes
- Lyrics: Jacques Levy
- Book: Jose Fernandez
- Basis: Film Fame by Christopher Gore
- Productions: 1988 Miami; 1995 West End; 1996 UK Tour; 1997 West End; 1998 West End; 1998 US Tour; 2000 UK Tour; 2000 West End; 2001 US Tour; 2001 UK Tour; 2003 US Tour; 2004 UK Tour; 2007 UK Tour; 2007 West End; 2014 UK Tour; 2018 UK Tour; 2019 UK Tour

Fame is a stage musical based on the 1980 musical film of the same name, with book by Jose Fernandez, music by Steve Margoshes and lyrics by Jacques Levy. Conceived and developed by David De Silva, it premiered in 1988 in Miami, Florida, and has spawned many stagings worldwide, including an Off-Broadway production at the Little Shubert Theatre from 2003 to 2004, under the title Fame on 42nd Street.

De Silva had produced the 1980 film about students at New York City's High School of Performing Arts. The critically and commercially successful film was followed by a six-season television series, and the musical. The musical is significantly rewritten from the previous adaptations, with an almost entirely new score except for the title Academy Award-winning song, "Fame". The film is referred to several times in the script and in two songs. It tells the story of several students who attend the school, among them fame-obsessed Carmen, ambitious actress Serena, wisecracking comedian/bad boy Joe, quiet violinist Schlomo, "talented but dyslexic" dancer Tyrone, determined actor Nick, overweight dancer Mabel, and a serious dancer, Iris, from a poor family.

== Synopsis ==
Act I

A group of vibrant, multi-ethnic, multi-cultural, energetic young people gather to audition to study at New York City's High School of Performing Arts. Miss Sherman, the homeroom teacher, warns the freshman class that it takes a lot more than dreams to succeed at "P.A." The students acknowledge that it takes ("Hard Work"). Before Algebra class, Serena meets Nick Piazza. He explains his passion for the performing arts and tells her he wants his acting to move people emotionally ("I Want to Make Magic"). Mr. Myers, the drama teacher, asks them to think about how a physical sensation can trigger an emotional response. Joe discusses the physical reactions that happen whenever he thinks of a beautiful girl (Carmen) in dance class ("Can't Keep it Down" or the alternative lyrics, "Can't Keep It Cool"). Meanwhile, in dance class Tyrone can't get to grips with Ballet and states that he can do better, resulting in the whole class doing a hip hop dance. This makes Miss Bell see Tyrone's potential as a choreographer, so she partners him with Iris, a ballerina. Iris mocks Tyrone's lack of classical dance experience. Enraged at her comments, he begins a rap expressing his anger ("Tyrone's Rap"). Iris apologizes and confesses that she is not really rich, but scared and they share a kiss.

At lunch, Carmen, a self-assured, cocky Latina spitfire, asks Mr. Myers if she can skip class on Friday to audition for West Side Story. He tells her that it would just be another role for her to hide behind. Carmen, enraged, dreams of seeing her name in lights and people gasping as she walks down the street ("There She Goes/Fame!"). The other students join in her fantasy and begin an exciting, electrifying dance.

Serena and Nick are rehearsing another scene and Serena confesses that she wants to try something romantic and passionate. Serena is in love with Nick, but Nick is mainly focused on acting. Serena laments her unrequited love ("Let's Play a Love Scene"). Afterwards, Carmen interrupts Schlomo while he practices his violin, giving him lyrics that she wrote for the melody he always plays. Schlomo tries them out, and changes some of the lyrics with Carmen and they share their first romantic moment. ("Bring on Tomorrow"), which results in Carmen joining the band. Carmen kisses Schlomo and leaves. Goody (also in the band, along with Lambchops) makes fun of Schlomo afterwards. In the hallway, Miss Sherman talks to Tyrone about his care-free attitude towards education. She threatens to keep him out of the Fall Festival if his grades don't improve. Miss Bell overhears and argues that Tyrone's artistic endeavors are more important than his academic performance ("The Teachers' Argument"). Tyrone storms off, threatening to drop out of school, and Miss Sherman reminds the gathered crowd of students of their academic commitments ("Hard Work (Reprise)").

Act II

The students begin their junior year with the P.A. Fall Festival ("The Junior Festival").

Nick congratulates Serena for getting the lead female role of Juliet in their junior show, Romeo and Juliet. Serena gets excited and assumes that Nick got the role of Romeo. However, she is surprised to learn that Joe Vegas has the role of Romeo and Nick got the part of Mercutio. Lambchops suggests that Nick is gay, and when Serena confronts him about it, Nick angrily replies that he is straight. Serena is so angry she decides to channel it into her acting ("Think of Meryl Streep"). Later, at a dance rehearsal, Mabel, an overweight dancer, complains about retaining water, and other problems she faces with the size of her body. She confesses that, although she tries many weight-loss schemes and diets, she always goes back to the "Seafood Diet: I see food, and then I eat it!" She prays aloud for God's help in keeping her from becoming "the world's fattest dancer" ("Mabel's Prayer"), eventually having an epiphany and deciding to switch her major to acting. Carmen tells Schlomo of her plan to leave school and go to Los Angeles. She has met a Hollywood agent named Elliot Greene, who is sending her a plane ticket. Schlomo begs her not to go. He had seen her getting into Elliot's limousine and accuses her of using cocaine with him. Schlomo tells Carmen he loves her, but is left alone with his violin/flute/keyboard (depending on what the actor can actually play).

In English class, Tyrone is reading a Superman comic book. Miss Sherman catches him, and forces him to stand up in front of the class and read from the comic book. He accuses her of trying to make him look stupid. He then accuses her of racism. Miss Sherman slaps him in the face and, shocked by what she has done, runs off. Tyrone says to his classmates he doesn't need her help, or the ability to read or write - he is a dancer, and that's all he needs (“Dancin’ on the Sidewalk.”). Miss Sherman returns and apologises for her outburst. She reveals that she believes Tyrone may have dyslexia and offers him extra help, to which Tyrone refuses and storms off. Miss Sherman pleads after him not to give up on her (“These Are My Children”).

The students rehearse Romeo and Juliet. Joe, insecure playing Romeo, has been ad-libbing. Joe starts to make fun of what he is saying, although is scared he'll mess up. Serena pleads with him to be serious in the part. Nick offers to show him how to play Romeo and winds up kissing Serena in their first romantic moment. Tyrone asks Iris why she has been avoiding him all year. She says she doesn't want to be tied to a loser. To show her that he is serious, he tells her he is repeating his senior year and reads a passage of Leaves of Grass to her. They dance a pas de deux and walk off together, hand in hand.

Carmen is standing in front of the school looking physically wasted and disoriented. She spots Schlomo and tells him the truth about her experiences in Hollywood ("In L.A."). Carmen promises him that she will quit the drugs and get her GED. He gives her a couple of dollars and sadly departs, reminding Carmen that he will always love her.

At the farewell party, everyone is dressed up and the celebration is loud and festive. Nick confesses his feelings to Serena and they decided to try to date although they are heading to different colleges ("Let's Play a Love Scene (Reprise)"). Schlomo reveals through monologue that Carmen has died of a drug overdose, and dedicates the classes' final senior song to her memory ("Bring On Tomorrow (Reprise)").

After the bows, Carmen comes back dancing on the roof of a taxi cab and sings "Fame" for the Finale.

== Productions ==
=== United States ===
In 1988, Fame had its first professional production at the Coconut Grove Playhouse in Miami, Florida. The original cast included Monique Cintron as Carmen Diaz, Joel Malina as Schlomo Metzenbaum, Janet Metz as Serena Katz, Tener Brown as Iris Kelly, and Harold Perrineau Jr. as Tyrone Jackson. Following this, the show ran at the Walnut Street Theatre in Philadelphia, Pennsylvania from March 25, through April 29, 1989.

The Musical had a short lived West Coast premiere in May 1994 at The Alex Theatre in Glendale, CA. Directed by Runar Borge, Choreographed by Lars Bethke, Musically Directed by Steven Smith at The Alex Theatre in Glendale, CA. The cast included: Jennifer George as Carmen Diaz, Yonah Kliger as Schlomo Metzenbaum, Farah Alvin as Serena Katz, Elkin Antoniou as Iris Kelly, Ron Kellum as Tyrone Jackson, Tony Spinosa as Joe Vegas, Steve Scott Springer as Nick Piazza, Denise Williams as Mabel Washington, Tracy Ray as Grace Lamb (Lambchops), Jim Vukovich as Goodman (Goody) King, Pamela Ross as Miss Sherman, Patty Tiffany as Miss Bell, Elliott Goldwag as Mr. Sheinkof, Gregg Perrie as Mr. Myers

The musical had a US tour directed by Lars Bethke in 1998.

It ran Off-Broadway at the Little Shubert Theatre from October 7, 2003 (previews), November 11, 2003 (official), through June 27, 2004, for 264 performances and 40 previews. Directed by Drew Scott Harris, conducted by Eric Knight Barnes, with lighting design by Ken Billington. The cast included Shakiem Evans as Tyrone Jackson, Nicole Leach, Cheryl Freeman, and Christopher J. Hanke. Marque Lynche as Tyrone Jackson was a replacement. This version was titled Fame on 42nd Street (the Little Shubert Theatre is on 42 Street).

A North American tour, produced by Phoenix Theatricals, began in September 2003 and played in 100 cities.

On May 9, 2019, a bilingual version directed by Luis Salgado opened at the GALA Theatre in Washington, D.C., to rave reviews from The Washington Post.

As part of MTI (Music Theatre International)'s Broadway Junior Series, a 60-minute adaptation was developed for middle schools (grades 6–9) and published in September 2011. Since 2012 over 200 productions of this version were licensed in North America. It has become one of the most popular shows licensed in the MTI catalog.

=== United Kingdom ===
It premiered at the Cambridge Theatre in London's West End in 1995. Miquel Brown, mother of acclaimed singer Sinitta, originated the role of Miss Sherman. This production was nominated for two Laurence Olivier awards but didn't win any. Since then there have been multiple West End runs, including a long run at the Aldwych Theatre from 2002 to 2006, the Cambridge, the Prince of Wales, the Shaftesbury Theatre, Victoria Palace, and a number of UK national tours. Among the many performers who have participated include Noel Sullivan as Nick Piazza and Barbara Dickson as Miss Ester Sherman.

The musical opened on May 4, 2007, for a summer production at the Shaftesbury Theatre in London's West End. The show was directed by Karen Bruce and sound designed by Gareth Owen, and the cast included Ian Watkins as Schlomo, Natalie Casey as Serena, Fem Belling as Mabel, and Jacqui Dubois as Miss Sherman.

A new UK touring production started in January 2009.

The show had a brief run at the Lyric Theatre in Hammersmith, London, between 18 and 20 August 2011, with a cast of youths from the Hammersmith and Fulham community.

Fame returned to the UK as the 25th anniversary tour directed and choreographed by Gary Lloyd opening February 20, 2014, in London at the New Wimbledon Theatre. It then traveled to Wolverhampton, Sunderland, York, Aylesbury, Sheffield, Leicester continuing on tour until November 2014.

The 30th anniversary tour opened in Manchester on July 20, 2018, produced by Selladoor Productions, and toured the UK through January 26, 2020. In October 2019, this production was filmed during its run at the Peacock Theatre in London and now is available to stream on BroadwayHD.

In 2025, it was announced that it would be revived at the Theatre Royal Plymouth for a strictly limited run in July 2026.

=== Other countries ===
Fame has been played in more than 30 countries, including Argentina, Australia, Brazil, Canada, China, Colombia, Czech Republic, Denmark, Dominican Republic, Estonia, Finland, France, Germany, Greece, Hungary, Iceland, Ireland, Italy, Japan, Mexico, Monaco, Netherlands, Norway, Poland, Portugal, Puerto Rico, South Africa, South Korea, Spain, Sweden, Switzerland, Thailand, United Kingdom, United States, and Venezuela, and has been translated into every major language.

In January 1993, a large-scale production of the musical made its European debut in Stockholm, Sweden, running for four years. The show came to the attention of choreographer-director Runar Borge, who has subsequently staged the show in numerous productions worldwide.

An Italian production premiered in Pavia, at Teatro Fraschini, directed by Gigi Saccomandi and Luigi Perego on September 20, 2003. A new version opened in Pavia directed by Bruno Fornasari on June 23, 2004, and toured Italy until March 2006.

In 1997 it was performed at the Teatro de los Insurgentes, Mexico City, with direction of Jaime Azpilicueta, choreography by Goyo Montero and musical direction by Jorge Aguilar, and later toured Latin America. The cast included Marger Sealey, Karin Aguilar, Alejandro Cervantes, Gianni Costantini and Antonio Melenciano.

A Catalan language production ran at Teatro Tivoli in Barcelona from April 27 to September 26, 2004, directed by Ramón Ribalta with choreography by Coco Comin. It reopened in Madrid in Spanish at Teatro Calderon February 1, 2006, and toured Spain until January 11, 2009.

An Estonian version opened in Tallinn in November 2006 to critical acclaim. The Estonian cast included Nele-Liis Vaiksoo as Serena, Rolf Roosalu as Schlomo and Kaire Vilgats as Miss Esther Sherman.

A Portuguese production was mounted in 2005 with Portuguese dialogue and the original English music. In 2008 the musical was brought back with some famous Portuguese names in the cast, like Patrícia Candoso as Serena and Fernando Fernandes as Schlomo.

In 2006, contestants from various seasons of the popular Puerto Rican television singing contest Objetivo Fama did a Spanish-language production of the musical in the Centro de Bellas Artes in San Juan, Puerto Rico. It was a three-night only engagement and was met with positive reviews by the press and fans alike.

An Italian production directed by Marco Daverio opened in Milan in December 2006 and toured through February 2007. It reopened on February 2, 2008, in Savona and toured through the end of the month.

In 2007, a Dutch talent-search competition called De Weg Naar Fame auditioned a large number of people in order to give four winners the chance to play Schlomo, Serena, Mabel, and Tyrone in the 2008 Dutch Tour of Fame. The show gave the finalists dance, vocal and acting training, and the three finalists for each character performed a piece from the musical in front of a panel of judges who made the final decision. The Dutch version includes Hein Gerrits as Schlomo, Kim-Lian van der Meij as Carmen, William Spaay as Joe, Doris Baaten as Miss Sherman, and Daphne Flint as Serena. Jim Bakkum understudied Schlomo.

On April 4, 2008, Fame opened in Paris at the Teatre Comedia.

In December 2008 The Nederlander Co with the Central Academy of Drama in Beijing presented the first production in Mandarin. Subsequently, a documentary, The Road to FAME, was filmed by Hao Wu following the students' preparation of the musical and how it affects the students' lives. It was presented in 2013 at the IFC Center in New York City.

The show toured Italy and Sicily from 2009 to 2010. This version included Benjamin Newsome as Schlomo.

The Australian Revival Tour in Australia opened in Melbourne in April 2010, then traveled to Sydney and Brisbane. The show was choreographed by So You Think You Can Dance's Kelley Abbey.

The show had its first Irish tour starting in the Grand Canal Theatre in Dublin from 19 August to 12 September 2010. The characters of Nick and Serena were played by Ben Morris and Jessica Cervi, winners of RTÉ's Fame: The Musical reality TV show. Other cast members included: Sheila Ferguson, Lisa Gorgin, Brittany Woodrow, Taofique Folarin, James Gibbs, Charlotte Watts, Yemie Sonuga, Fra Fee, Hollie Taylor, Tara Young, Chris Jeffers, Aaron Parker, Hannah Wilson, Jaye Elster, Sarah Wilkie and Nicholas Collier. The show was directed by Brian Flynn and choreographed by Gary Lloyd, who has previously worked on the hit show Thriller – Live. The tour ended at the Wexford Opera House, on November 14, 2010.

In September 2011, it opened at M Theatre in Bangkok, Thailand, with the cast coming from Academy Fantasia and the KPN Awards. This version, produced by Dreambbox, featured Nat Sakdatorn as Nick Piazza.

From November 25, 2011, to January 29, 2012, it played at the Woori Financial Art Hall in Seoul, South Korea, starring Eunhyuk of Super Junior; Tiffany of Girls' Generation; Son Ho Young, Ko Eun-sung, Kim Chan Ho, Shin Ui Jeong, and Lina of The Grace; and Choi Ju Ri, KoN and Kim Jung Mo of TRAX.

On May 5, 2012, it opened in Orebro, Sweden, at the Tyst Theatr with a world Swedish Sign Language premiere production, "Visukal", for the hearing impaired.

A Portuguese production opened in São Paulo, Brazil, May 21, 2012, at Teatro Frei Caneca produced jointly by the Ministry of Culture and 4Act Productions, under the general coordination of Ricardo Marques. It was directed by Billy Johnstone with choreography by Guto Muniz and musical direction by Paulo Nogueira. Assisting the director was Gustavo Torres, and the vocal coach was Rafael Villar.

In Greece it opened on December 17, 2012, at the Theatron in Athens.

A Polish production premiered in march 2022 at the Teatr Muzyczny Adria in Koszalin.

== Characters ==
- Nick Piazza: A serious classical actor. He has a secret romantic interest in Serena.
- Serena Katz: A "shy" actress. Has a romantic interest in Nick. Nerdy but is very talented. Does not look too kindly on Joe.
- Joe "José" Vegas: Spanish acting student who is the comic of the show. Comes from a bad home and is dealt the bad hand. Develops a crush on Carmen, but it is later revealed that it's much more than "just a crush". He does not handle his sexual feelings well, either. He is also considered a bad boy and isn't liked by Serena very much.
- Carmen Diaz: A triple-threat dance major, sassy, confident and determined to make it big. She is obsessed with fame and confident in her abilities. Initially has a casual relationship with Tyrone, but develops returned romantic feelings for Schlomo. Also has a fling with Joe (not really). She leaves school and moves to L.A. during the middle of 11th grade after an "agent" promises to make her a star.
- Tyrone Jackson: A hip hop dancer who is talented but dyslexic and comes from a poor family. Shares a love-hate relationship with Iris. In some productions is replaced by Jack Zakowski, a dancer who is a Russian immigrant and illiterate .
- Iris Kelly: A talented ballet dancer who is believed to be extremely wealthy although it is later revealed (in the amateur and schools edition of the script) that she is not. She appears stuck up but is actually insecure. She shares a love-hate relationship with Tyrone.
- Mabel Washington: A dancer and singer who is overweight and trying to lose weight "but can't resist food".
- Schlomo Metzenbaum: A quiet, saintly classical violinist (or pianist or flutist, depending on the actor), who sets up the rock band, and takes on the role of caretaker to his classmates. Schlomo comes from a musical background, with a father who is a famous violinist. Schlomo is fed up with the strain of being expected to do well and wishes to rebel. Has a romantic interest in Carmen from afar. Constantly competes with Joe to win over Carmen. Does not like Joe very much but they begin to accept each other when Carmen leaves.
- Grace "Lambchops" Lamb: A "rock chick and tomboy" who is the drummer for Schlomo's band. Does not take school "seriously". Develops a love-hate relationship with Goody.
- Goodman "Goody" King: A trumpet/saxophone/guitar musician who is in Schlomo's band. Develops a love-hate relationship with Grace. Sarcastic yet sensitive at times.
- Miss Esther Sherman: A strict, old-fashioned and academic English teacher who loves her students, despite the fact that she comes down hard on them.
- Miss Greta Bell: A dance teacher who likes different styles of dance and is "protective" of the students.
- Mr. Myers: The drama teacher. Is a "father-figure" to Joe and is encouraging the students.
- Mr. Sheinkopf: German Music tutor who loves classical music but does not like "rock and roll".

== Musical numbers ==
Act I

- Pray/Hard Work - Nick, Serena, Joe, Carmen, Mabel, and Company
- I Want to Make Magic - Nick
- Can't Keep It Down - Joe, Students
- Tyrone's Rap (or Jack's Rap) - Tyrone (or Jack)
- There She Goes/Fame! - Carmen, students
- Let's Play a Love Scene - Serena
- Bring on Tomorrow - Schlomo, Carmen
- Teacher's Argument - Miss Bell, Miss Sherman
- Hard Work (Reprise) - Company

Act 2

- The Junior Festival * - Nick, Serena, Carmen, Joe and Company
- Think of Meryl Streep - Serena
- Mabel's Prayer - Mabel, Girls
- Dancin' on the Sidewalk - Tyrone (or Jack) and students
- These Are My Children - Miss Sherman
- Pas de Deux § - Tyrone and Iris
- In L.A. † - Carmen
- Let's Play a Love Scene (Reprise) - Nick and Serena
- Bring on Tomorrow (Reprise) - Schlomo, Serena, Nick, Lambchops, Iris, Tyrone, Joe, Mabel, Goody, Students
- Finale: Fame (Reprise) - Carmen, and Company

* Some productions such as Fame on 42nd Street use the song "There She Goes! (Reprise)" (also known as "The Fall Festival") as an alternative to "I Want to Make Magic (Reprise)". This version has a more Spanish theme to the song. However, it still contains elements of the "I Want to Make Magic (Reprise)" in it. Carmen and Serena only sing during the junior festival when the alternate (longer) versions of the songs are used.

§ The Pas De Deux uses music from the ballet "This Is Forever" by Steve Margoshes. However, some productions use music by Mark Berman.

† In some productions "In LA" is replaced with "Out Here On My Own".

== Orchestration ==
The orchestra calls for a rock combo of 12 musicians and a chorus of five backup singers (three male and two female). The instrumentation calls for two keyboards, two guitars, electric bass, drums, percussion, violin, a woodwind player, two trumpeters and trombone. Either keyboard part can by played by the conductor. The woodwind player doubles on flute, clarinet, soprano, alto, tenor and baritone saxophone. One guitarist plays lead while the other plays rhythm.

== Original casts ==
Character	West End (1995)	North American Tour (1998)	Off-Broadway (2003)
Nick Piazza	Richard Dempsey	Gavin Creel	Christopher J. Hanke
Serena Katz	Gemma Wardle	Jennifer Gambatese	Sara Schmidt
Joe "José" Vegas	Marcos D'Cruze	José Restrepo	José Restrepo
Carmen Diaz	Lorraine Vélez	Natasha Rennalls	Nicole Leach
Tyrone Jackson	Scott Sherrin	Dwayne Chattman	Shakiem Evans
Iris Kelly	Josefina Gabrielle	Nadine Isenegger	Emily Corney
Mabel Washington	Sonia Swaby	Dioni Michelle Collins	Q. Smith
Schlomo Metzenbaum	Jonathan Aris	Carl Tramon	Dennis Moench
Grace "Lambchops" Lamb	Nicola Bolton	Amy Ehrlich	Jenna Coker
Goodman "Goody" King	Alastair Willis	Robert Creighton	Michael Kary
Miss Ester Sherman	Miquel Brown	Regina Le Vert	Cheryl Freeman
Miss Greta Bell	Vivien Parry	Kim Cea	Nancy Hess
Mr. Myers	Bill Champion	Richard G. Rodgers	Peter Reardon
Mr. Sheinkopf	Harry Landis	William Linton	Gannon McHale

== Recordings ==
- 1993: Fame The Musical: Swedish Cast Recording
- 1993: Fama El Musical: Original Hispanoamericano Recording
- 1995: Fame The Musical: Original London Cast Recording
- 1997: Fame Das Tanzmusical: European Touring Cast Recording
- 1997: Fame The Musical: Polish Cast Recording
- 1999: Fame The Musical: Original American Cast Recording
- 2000: Songs from Fame The Musical: Australian Touring Cast Recording
- 2000: Fame De Musical: Original Dutch Cast Recording
- 2001: Fame A Musical: Original Hungarian Cast Recording
- 2003: Fame on 42nd Street: Original Off-Broadway Cast Recording
- 2004: Fama El Musical: Original Barcelona Cast Recording
- 2004: Fame: Icelandic Cast Recording
- 2005: Fame O Musical: Original Portuguese Cast Recording
- 2006: Fama El Musical: Original Madrid Cast Recording
- 2007: Fame A Musical: Remake of the Hungarian Fame not with the original cast
- 2008: De Nederlandse Fame: Dutch Revival Cast Recording
- 2011: Fame The Musical: Original Thai Cast Recording
- 2011: Fame The Musical: Original Korean Cast Recording
- 2012: Fame O Musical: Original Brazilian Cast Recording

Information taken from CastAlbums.org

== Award nominations ==
- Laurence Olivier Award for Best New Musical
- Laurence Olivier Award for Best New Choreographer (Lars Bettke)
