= High School of Music and Art =

High School of Music and Art may refer to:

- Fiorello H. LaGuardia High School, formed in 1984 as the merger of other schools
  - The High School of Music and Art, New York alternative school established in 1936, which merged in 1984 into the Fiorello school
  - High School of Performing Arts, New York school founded in 1948. Inspiration for the 1980 film Fame, it merged in 1984 into the Fiorello school
- Juilliard School, prestigious performing arts conservatory in New York, established in 1905
