= Isaac (talk show) =

- Presented by: Isaac Mizrahi
- Country of origin: United States

Original release
- Network: Style Network
- Release: December 5, 2005 – May 25, 2007

Isaac is an American TV show hosted by fashion designer and personality Isaac Mizrahi. It was shot in New York City, and aired on the Style Network in the United States. It premiered on December 5, 2005, and ended on May 25, 2007. Segments included man-on-the-street interviews, "Sketches and Answers" and celebrity interviews. He was supported by "Ben and the band" and an on-set coffee bar that served coffee to the most famous guests.

The show package was designed and created by E! On Air Design Art Director, Phil Han with Executive Producer Dione Li and SVP, Creative Director, Ann Epstein-Cohen.
