= Nancy Littlefield =

American documentary filmmaker and television producer

Nancy Kassell Littlefield (September 18, 1929 – August 30, 2007) was a director and producer of television and documentary programs, who was the director of the New York City Mayor’s Office of Film, Theater and Broadcasting from 1978 until 1983, during the administration of then-Mayor Edward I. Koch. She was born in The Bronx, New York.

Her assignment was to expedite the process, with her office cutting the red tape that had deterred many producers. She was successful and, in 1979 alone, she estimated that film, television and commercials had brought US$500,000,000 to NYC's coffers. Among the feature films shot entirely or partly in NYC during Ms. Littlefield’s tenure were Kramer vs. Kramer, All That Jazz, Fame, Prince of the City, Fort Apache, The Bronx, Annie and The World According to Garp.

== Personal life ==
Born in New York City to Benjamin George and Mildred Christine (Herndon) Kassel, Nancy had a brother, William. The family lived for a time at 2017 Walton Avenue, Bronx, New York.

Her marriage to William Littlefield ended in divorce, although she kept her ex-husband's surname professionally. Her companion, David Martin, died in 2006.

== Death ==
Nancy Littlefield died in Delray Beach, Florida, aged 77, from cancer. She was survived by a son, Joshua, and a daughter, Amy Norton, and five grandchildren.
