= Mark Berman =

American jazz musician

Mark Berman is a New York City pianist, composer, producer, conductor, music director and arranger.

== Music career ==
Berman has performed with Aretha Franklin, Blood Sweat & Tears, Carole King, Gladys Knight, Hugh Jackman, Illinois Jacquet, Ben E King, Jackie McLean, Cornelius Bumpus, Buster Poindexter, Clark Terry, Lesley Gore, Richie Havens, Helen Reddy, Jennifer Holliday, Phil Ramone, Chita Rivera, Phoebe Snow, and Eartha Kitt.

On Broadway, he conducted Rent, Smokey Joe's Cafe, and Blood Brothers and played lead piano in the orchestras of The Boy From Oz, Hairspray, Dreamgirls, Brooklyn The Musical, Jesus Christ Superstar, 42nd Street, The Life, Spider-Man: Turn Off the Dark, and others including the Public Theater of New York's production of Hair in Central Park in 2008 and its Broadway revival in 2009. He has also written additional music, a classical pas-de-deux, for Fame the Musical. He was the assistant music director and pianist for the Broadway production of Bullets Over Broadway.

He is represented off-Broadway by his original music compositions for the acclaimed revival of Sidney Howard's comedy/drama The Late Christopher Bean, directed by Jenn Thompson for TACT at the Beckett. He also music directed, conducted and played piano for the New York Musical Theatre Festival production of Seeing Stars, a new musical set in the world of boxing, written by Don and Jeff Breithaupt with a book by Shelley McPherson, also directed by Jenn Thompson.

His piano and keyboard playing can be heard on the theme of the HBO series Sex and the City. Berman has written additional music for the program and can be seen on an episode. He has also written music for Bravo, the Food Network, Nurse Jackie, the Showtime series and a variety of network daytime series.

Among Berman's television appearances are The Today Show, Good Morning America, The Rosie O'Donnell Show, PBS, and a variety of soap operas.

He has performed in jazz clubs around the world including The Blue Note, Rainbow Room, Birdland, The Cutting Room, B.B. King's, the Supper Club and Top of the Rock at Rockefeller Center. Berman has appeared at Weil Hall at Carnegie Hall, at Merkin Hall at Lincoln Center, and can be heard on numerous recordings.

Berman has also written and produced commercial jingles for the Campbell's, Armour hot dogs and Sara Lee.

In 2006, Berman was music director of Jam & Spice, a "jazzy" Kurt Weill revue at the Westport Country Playhouse, in Westport, Connecticut. He received strong praise for his playing and conducting from Variety, the Hartford Courant and other publications.

He returned to the Westport Country Playhouse in the summer of 2007 to be music director of Being Alive, a musical based on the work of Stephen Sondheim but with arrangements in soul, blues, jazz, R & B, gospel and hip hop styles. Once again, he received critical acclaim for both his playing and music direction.

Berman was music director, arranger, and orchestrator of Marcy in the Galaxy, a world premier musical presented by The Transport Group at the Connelly Theater in New York City.

Berman returned to the Westport Country Playhouse in 2008 to be the music director, lead pianist and the arranger of additional music for Hot n' Cole: A Cole Porter Celebration, directed by Tony Award-winning actor James Naughton. His piano playing was cited as "dazzling" by Variety. Of his arrangement and musical direction of "Ev'ry Time We Say Goodbye" Theatermania wrote, "the entire ensemble is flawless, with the Hi-Lo's-like harmonies a treat Porter himself would have praised."

Berman has written the theme and additional music for Kidnapped by the Kids, which premiered on OWN, the Oprah Winfrey television network, on April 4, 2011. He also played piano on an episode of Royal Pains during season 3 on the USA Network in 2011.

== The Genesis Project ==
His debut recording Mark Berman's The Genesis Project received widespread acclaim from broadcasters, musicians and the jazz press. Berman wrote, arranged and produced this jazz, R & B, and funk composition, based on the allegory of the seven days of Creation, but particularly evoking themes of ecology, human rights and peace. The CD was officially released with a full performance to a capacity audience on October 30, 2007, at Birdland in New York City. The work features some of the most prominent musicians in New York. According to Birdland, "The music weaves gracefully through many styles -- straight-ahead jazz to Samba, R&B, gospel, hip hop and Rock. The band expertly navigates these styles with great grooves and sensitivity. It's a thrilling musical ride."

Berman was interviewed around the world at the time of the album's release (he was a featured guest on Voice of America radio). and received international recognition as a jazz artist. His music continues to be broadcast on radio stations, networks and syndicated programming both in the US and abroad.

Jazz critic Jonathan Widran wrote in Smooth Jazz Vibes, "The veteran NYC pianist and Broadway conductor explores the first chapter of the Bible with a witty, Manhattan Transfer-ish vocal harmony driven mix combining elements of rock, soul, samba, gospel and blues. This engaging set celebrates Judeo-Christian traditions while drawing attention to our connection to the earth itself."

Modern Drummer wrote: "A meditation on the book of Genesis in today's eco-battered world, Project features six vocalists negotiating daunting jazz harmonies with a kicking seven-piece band. Mark Berman shines as keyboardist, composer, and arranger, bridging jazz, R&B, and gospel, while ace drummers Clint de Ganon and Rocky Bryant deliver seamless, tight, aggressive drive and commanding pocket."
