= Antonia Franceschi =

American dancer, actress, choreographer

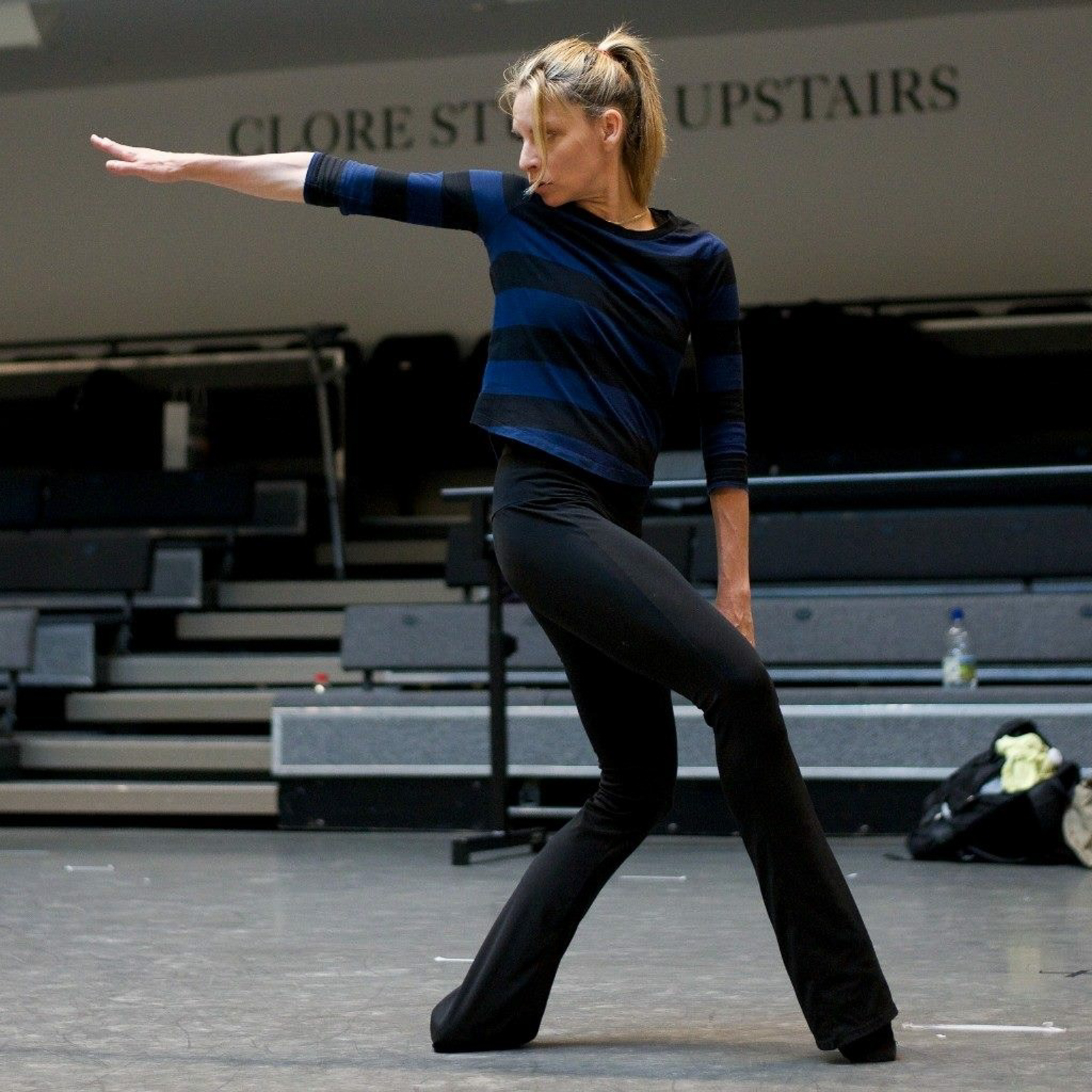
- Born: March 30, 1960 (age 66); Columbus, Ohio, U.S.
- Education: Fiorello H. LaGuardia High School; High School of Performing Arts; School of American Ballet
- Occupations: Dancer; choreographer; movement director; actress; dance teacher; producer
- Known for: Fame; New York City Ballet
- Website: antoniafranceschi.com

Antonia Franceschi (born March 30, 1960) is an American dancer, choreographer and actress.

Franceschi was one of the last generations selected by George Balanchine to join The New York City Ballet. She is a Time Out Award winner for Outstanding Achievement In Dance.

She is also known for her dance performances in the film musicals Fame and Grease. She subsequently danced under George Balanchine and Peter Martins at the New York City Ballet.

She now works as a choreographer and dance company director, dividing her time between the United Kingdom and the USA.

== Early life ==
Franceschi grew up in the American Midwest. Her parents divorced when she was eight years old, and she moved with her mother to New York City. She joined a gang for protection; she also studied ballet and began working in the theater by the age of nine for The Metropolitan Opera. She studied the ballet through the Cecchetti method under Margaret Craske and attended the High School of Performing Arts in Manhattan.

== Career ==
=== Early Career in the US ===
Franceschi was cast as a dancer in the 1978 film Grease. She was too young to work legally, but worked under a falsified birth certificate. She was expelled from the High School of Performing Arts where she was in the Drama department, because students were not allowed to work professionally. She used her earnings from Grease to attend Professional Children's School, which allowed her to attend School Of American Ballet.

She went on to play Hilary van Doren, a ballet student from a wealthy background in the 1980 film Fame, set at the same High School of Performing Arts that Franceschi had attended in real life. Following this brief film career, she focused on more traditional ballet performance. She danced several roles with Makarova and Company in 1980, including performing as an understudy to company lead Natalia Makarova. Following that, she was recruited by George Balanchine to be in the company at the New York City Ballet, where she danced for eleven years. She has performed in about 50 of Balanchine's nearly 100 works.

She had works created for her by George Balanchine, Jerome Robbins, Lar Lubovitch, Jean-Pierre Bonnefous, Mark Baldwin, Wayne McGregor, Michael Clarke, Arlene Phillips, and Karole Armitage.

=== Expanding to the UK ===
She moved to London in 1995, where she has continued to work as a Guest Artist, Producer, Teacher, Writer, Choregrapher and Advisor, collaborating with many Organizations, Composers and Artists.

She is a producer of the New York Ballet Stars, collaborating with Sir Alistair Spalding, Tom Ades, and Karole Armitage. She toured Harrogate and the Sintra Festival, with dancers from The New York City Ballet and American Ballet Theater.

In 2002, Franceschi developed Up From the Waste, a semi-autobiographical account of her difficult childhood, addressing gangs, drugs, harassment, rape, murder, obsession and anorexia. It shows her eventual escape through dance, but reflects earlier traumas in the dance world's demanding environment, including disordered eating, emotional abuse and sexual predation. The Soho Theatre staged it, directed by Nancy Meckeler.

In 2005, Ballet Black premiered Franceschi's piece Shift, Trip, Catch. She has described the theme of the work as "You can shift if you're in a relationship, and hopefully they’ll catch you." Reviewers noted the work for "[flexing] its emotional muscle, with a crackle of combative dance" and its "bold all-American punch."

Her 2009 piece Kinderszenen is set to the musical work “Childhood Scenes” by composer Allen Shawn; reviewers noted its "lively moments" and "clever transitions, the fluid relationship between classical steps and the score." Also in 2009 was the launch of her multimedia work Pop8, for the Lion and Unicorn Theatre where she collaborated with Mark Baldwin, Zoe Martlew and Ballet Black which encompassed music, film, and dance to portray the rhythms of urban life on a small stage.

Franceschi has choreographed for both British and American companies, and has her own Company 'AFD Just Dance', which premiered in July 2015, performing at The Valletta Opera House, The Royal Winchester Theatre, London, and recently The MMA Center, NYC, and most recently she had two NY premiers, Uncaged, She Holds Out Her Hand with The New York Theater Ballet collaborating with Claire van Kampen and Say My Name, Barnard/Columbia Dancers with Composers Karen Le Frak and Allen Shawn.

In 2022, Franceschi choreographed for theatre in the UK for Dr. Semmelweis, directed by Tom Morris, co-written by Sir Mark Rylance and Stephen Brown which starred Sir Rylance at London's Harold Pinter Theatre. A review in The Guardian wrote, "Under the direction of Tom Morris, the production is almost as much a dance as it is a play, with expressionist movement (choreography by Antonia Franceschi) and music (by Adrian Sutton) that take us inside Semmelweis’s mind, from his bursts of anger to his final unravelling. A chorus of ghostly dancers – the women he has been unable to save – enact anguish while violins and the cello weep. These elements together run the risk of an overwrought atmosphere but the production steers clear of that. Instead there is intensity, and the drama feels drawn out in its pain." Franceschi also choreographed Othello at The Globe Theater in London, directed by Claire van Kampen and was Movement Director for The Other Place at The Park Theatre. She was the Associate Choreographer for Arlene Philips' duet for Candoco and the Rehearsal Director for The Royal Opera House production of Other Stories with Wendy Whelan and Edward Watson. She has choreographed for The Rambert School and Joffrey School.

Franceschi has been an advisory board member of vildwerk. since 2025, a nonprofit organization inspiring conservation awareness through dance. She created two ballets for vildwerk., a nonprofit organization inspiring conservation awareness through dance. Asylum, in collaboration with The Royal Ballet’s Edward Watson, and Six Breaths, with the New York City Ballet’s Alexa Maxwell and Victor Abreu.

In April 2019 Franceschi presented Shift for The Emerging Choreographers Program at the 92stY, New York, Liberandum for Joaquín De Luz for Theatre Real Madrid and Skirball in June 2019.

Ms. Franceschi has been interviewed for the book, Balanchine, Then and Now and has been a guest on Women's Hour, BBC Radio 4.

Franceschi is an established dance teacher, she has done guest teaching for many prominent companies and institutions including The Royal Ballet, The New York City Ballet, Rambert, Richard Alston Dance Company, Wayne McGregor Dance (formerly Random), DV8, The New York Theatre Ballet, Alvin Ailey, Joffrey School, and, Juilliard.

== Works ==
=== As choreographer ===
- Up from the Waste, 2002
- Shift, Trip, Catch, 2005
- Kinderszenen, 2009
- Pop8, 2009 [multimedia]
- Othello, 2018 [theatre]
- The Other Place, 2018 [theatre]
- Othello, 2018
- Liberandum, 2019
- Dr. Semmelweis, 2022 [theatre]
- Idaspe, 2022 [opera]

== Filmography ==
=== Film ===
Year	Title	Role	Notes
1978	Grease	Dancer	
1980	Fame	Hilary van Doren	
1986	The Karate Kid Part II	The Dancer on the Television Set	
2000	The Golden Bowl	The Ballet: First Queen	

=== Television ===
Year	Title	Role	Notes
2015	BBC Young Dancer	Self - Ballet Second Round Judge	
