= Fame (1980 film) =

1980 film by Alan Parker

- Theatrical release poster
- Directed by: Alan Parker
- Written by: Christopher Gore
- Produced by: David De Silva; Alan Marshall
- Starring: Eddie Barth; Irene Cara; Lee Curreri; Laura Dean; Antonia Franceschi; Boyd Gaines; Albert Hague; Tresa Hughes; Steve Inwood; Paul McCrane; Anne Meara; Joanna Merlin; Barry Miller; Jim Moody; Gene Anthony Ray; Maureen Teefy
- Cinematography: Michael Seresin
- Edited by: Gerry Hambling
- Music by: Michael Gore
- Production company: Metro-Goldwyn-Mayer
- Distributed by: United Artists (United States); Cinema International Corporation (International)
- Release dates: May 12, 1980 (Ziegfeld Theatre); June 20, 1980 (United States)
- Running time: 133 minutes
- Country: United States
- Language: English
- Budget: $8.5 million
- Box office: $42 million

Fame is a 1980 American musical drama film directed by Alan Parker and written by Christopher Gore. Set in New York City, it chronicles the lives and hardships of students attending The High School of Performing Arts, from their auditions to their freshman, sophomore, junior, and senior years.

Producer David De Silva conceived the premise in 1976, partially inspired by the musical A Chorus Line. He commissioned playwright Gore to write the script, originally titled Hot Lunch, before selling it to Metro-Goldwyn-Mayer (MGM). After he was hired to direct the film, Parker rewrote the script with Gore, aiming for a darker and more dramatic tone. Due to the script's subject matter, the New York Board of Education prevented the production from filming in the actual High School of Performing Arts. The film was shot on location in New York City, with principal photography beginning in July 1979 and concluding after 91 days. Parker encountered a difficult filming process, which included conflicts with U.S. labor unions.

Fame received a limited release beginning at the Ziegfeld Theatre in New York City on May 12, 1980, and had a wide release in the United States on June 20, by United Artists. The film grossed more than $42 million worldwide against a production budget of $8.5 million. It initially received a mixed response from reviewers who praised the music, but criticized the dramatic tone, pacing and direction although the film has been reappraised over the years. The film received several awards and nominations, including two Academy Awards for Best Original Song ("Fame") and Best Original Score, and a Golden Globe Award for Best Original Song ("Fame"). Its success spawned a media franchise encompassing multiple television series, a stage musical, and a remake released in 2009.

In 2023, the film was selected for preservation in the United States National Film Registry by the Library of Congress as being "culturally, historically, or aesthetically significant".

== Plot ==
Auditions

In New York City in the mid-to-late 1970s, a group of teenagers audition to study at the High School of Performing Arts, where they are sorted into three departments: Drama, Music, and Dance.

Accepted in the Drama department are Montgomery MacNeil, son of a well-known actress; Doris Finsecker, a shy Jewish girl with an overbearing mother; and Ralph Garci, who succeeds after failed auditions for Music and Dance.

In the Music department, Bruno Martelli is an aspiring keyboardist whose electronic equipment horrifies Mr. Shorofsky, a conservative music teacher.

In the Dance department, Coco Hernandez coolly hints at how she could join any of the three departments while Lisa Monroe is talkative and nervous. Leroy Johnson attends to perform his part of a dance routine for an auditioning friend, but the dance teachers are more impressed by his talents than his friend's.

Freshman year

The students learn during their first day of classes that academics are weighed equally with performance. In the lunchroom, Doris becomes overwhelmed by the energy and spontaneity of the other students ("Hot Lunch Jam"). She befriends Montgomery, but worries that she is too ordinary against the colorful personalities of the other students. As the year progresses, Coco tries to convince Bruno to book performing gigs with her. Leroy clashes with his English teacher Mrs. Sherwood over his refusal to do homework. It is later revealed that he is semi-illiterate. Bruno and his father argue over Bruno's reluctance to play his electronic music publicly. Miss Berg, the school's Dance teacher, warns Lisa that she is not working hard enough. Michael, a graduating senior, wins a prestigious scholarship and tells Doris that the William Morris Agency wants to send him out for auditions for television pilots.

Sophomore year

A wealthy new student, Hilary van Doren, joins the school's Dance department and becomes romantically involved with Leroy. Bruno and Mr. Shorofsky debate the merits of traditional orchestras versus synthesized instruments. Bruno's father plays his music ("Fame") outside the school, inspiring the student body to dance in the streets. As an acting exercise, the students are asked to divulge a painful memory. Montgomery discusses discovering his homosexuality, while coming out in front of his classmates; Doris relates her humiliation at being forced by her stage mother to sing at a child's birthday party; and Ralph tells of learning about the death of his idol Freddie Prinze. Miss Berg drops Lisa from the Dance program, and after seemingly considering suicide in a New York City Subway station, Lisa drops her dance clothes on the subway tracks and decides to join the Drama department.

Junior year

Ralph and Doris discover their mutual attraction, but their growing intimacy leaves Montgomery feeling excluded. Hilary brings Leroy home, much to the shock of her father and stepmother. Ralph's young sister is attacked by a junkie and Ralph lashes out at his mother's attempts to comfort the child by taking her to the local Catholic church instead of to a doctor. Doris begins to question her Jewish upbringing, changing her name to "Dominique DuPont" and straining the relationship with her mother. During a late-night showing of The Rocky Horror Picture Show at the 8th Street Playhouse, Ralph encourages Doris to smoke marijuana. Intoxicated, Doris takes part in the stage show during the film's "Time Warp" musical number. The next day, she realizes that as an actress she can put on any personality she wants, but is sobered upon running into Michael, who is struggling as an actor and waiting tables.

Senior year

Ralph performs comedy at Catch a Rising Star, where he garners some initial success, but falls into a hard-party lifestyle that upsets Doris. Given a prime spot at another comedy club, he bombs after clashing with both Doris and Montgomery over his new lifestyle. Disgusted with himself, Ralph believes his career is over, but is comforted by Montgomery who tells him that failure is a part of the entertainment business. Hilary, now pregnant, plans to have an abortion and move to California to take a position with the San Francisco Ballet company. Coco is approached in a diner by a man claiming to be a director; she naïvely goes to his apartment for a screen test, but discovers that he is an amateur pornographic film director. He manipulates her into taking her shirt off, as he films her sobbing. Leroy is offered a position in Alvin Ailey's dance company, but must graduate first in order to be accepted. After receiving a failing grade, he confronts a grieving Mrs. Sherwood outside her husband's hospital room, but upon realizing that she has her own problems, he comforts her. During graduation, the student body showcases their talents by performing an original song ("I Sing the Body Electric"). The opening lines are sung by Lisa, Coco, and Montgomery. Intercut with the performance are scenes of Leroy dancing and Bruno playing with a rock band, finally sharing his music with others.

== Cast ==
- Irene Cara as Coco Hernandez – Drama, Music and Dance
- Lee Curreri as Bruno Martelli – Music
- Laura Dean as Lisa Monroe – Dance
- Antonia Franceschi as Hilary Van Doren – Dance
- Paul McCrane as Montgomery MacNeil – Drama
- Barry Miller as Ralph Garci/Raul Garcia – Drama
- Gene Anthony Ray as Leroy Johnson – Dance
- Maureen Teefy as Doris Finsecker – Drama
- Albert Hague as Mr. Shorofsky – Music
- Anne Meara as Mrs. Sherwood – English
- Joanna Merlin as Ms. Berg – Dance
- Jim Moody as Mr. Farrell – Drama
- Debbie Allen as Lydia – Dance
- Eddie Barth as Angelo Martelli, Bruno's father
- Boyd Gaines as Michael
- Tresa Hughes as Naomi Finsecker, Doris's mother
- Steve Inwood as François Lafete
- Richard Belzer as Catch a Rising Star M.C.
- Bill Britten as Mr. England
- Isaac Mizrahi as Touchstone
- Sal Piro as Rocky Horror M.C.
- Michael DeLorenzo as Principal dancer
- Meg Tilly as Principal dancer

== Production ==
=== Development and writing ===
"It's a very strange thing to grow up to be a performer, to expose yourself at a time when growing up is difficult enough anyway. It involves a great deal of courage and the risk of enormous pain. Fame is a film which shows how kids prepare themselves for failure as well as success."

— Alan Parker, director

In 1976, talent manager David De Silva attended a stage production of A Chorus Line and noticed that one of the musical numbers, "Nothing", had made a reference to the New York City High School of Performing Arts. The musical inspired him to create a story detailing how ambition and rejection influence the lives of adolescent students. In 1977, De Silva travelled to Florida, where he met playwright Christopher Gore. He paid Gore $5,000 to draft a script titled Hot Lunch, and provided story ideas involving the plot and characters. De Silva took the project to Metro-Goldwyn-Mayer (MGM), which acquired the script for $400,000.

Director Alan Parker received the script after the release of his previous film Midnight Express (1978). He met with De Silva in New York City where the two agreed that Parker would draft his own script, with Gore receiving sole screenwriting credit. Parker also enlisted his colleague Alan Marshall as a producer. Gore travelled to London where he and Parker began work on a second draft, which was significantly darker than what De Silva had intended. De Silva explained, "I was really motivated and interested in the joy of what the school represented for these kids, and [Parker] was really much more interested in where the pain was in going to the school, and so we had our little conflicts based on that area."

Parker signed on as the film's director in February 1979, and relocated to Greenwich, Connecticut, to begin pre-production. While working on the script, he interacted with many of the students attending the Performing Arts school. Several of them invited Parker to attend a midnight screening of The Rocky Horror Picture Show (1975) at the 8th Street Playhouse. Parker attended a weekend screening with Marshall, and the enthusiastic crowd inspired him to write a similar scene for the film, during which the character Doris Finsecker dances along to the "Time Warp" musical number. During filming, Parker noticed that a pornographic film showing on 42nd Street was titled Hot Lunch, and was informed that the title was "New York slang for oral sex." In response, MGM offered several working titles before Parker named the film Fame after the 1975 song performed by David Bowie.

=== Casting ===
Although Parker had promised to hold auditions at the High School of Performing Arts, the school was initially advised by the Board of Education to prevent the students from working on the film, fearing it would affect their studies. It was later announced that filming would occur during the summer when the students were not attending school. Parker distributed casting call advertisements at the Performing Arts school and the High School of Music & Art. He and casting directors Margery Simkin and Howard Feuer spent four months of the film's pre-production auditioning young performers. They held an open casting call at the Diplomat Hotel on 43rd Street in Manhattan where more than 2,000 people auditioned for various roles.

Of the many students that Parker met at the Performing Arts, only Laura Dean, who plays Lisa Monroe, was cast in a principal role while others were cast as extras. The school's drama teacher Jim Moody plays as Mr. Farell, and its music teacher Jonathan Strasser appears as a conductor. Music composer and actor Albert Hague secured the role of music teacher Mr. Shorofsky, as Parker wanted a veteran musician to play the part.

Irene Cara, a former student of the school, was cast as Coco Hernandez. Parker was not impressed with Cara's musical audition, until after her recording sessions with the film's composer Michael Gore. Gene Anthony Ray, who plays Leroy Johnson, was also a Performing Arts student but had been expelled from the school for disruptive behavior. Simkin had discovered Ray breakdancing on a street corner in Harlem before asking him to audition for a role in the film.

Lee Curreri, who was cast as Bruno Martelli, learned of the production while attending the Manhattan School of Music. During his audition, Paul McCrane performed an original song he had written, "Is It Okay If I Call You Mine?". He was cast as Montgomery MacNeil, and the song inspired Parker to include it in the film. Barry Miller, who achieved critical acclaim for his supporting role in Saturday Night Fever (1977), was cast as Ralph Garci, an aspiring actor and standup comic of Puerto Rican descent.

Maureen Teefy, an established actress of Irish descent, was cast as Doris Finsecker, a shy and uptight Jewish girl. De Silva disagreed with her casting, stating, "... I'd envisioned [Doris] as a 16-or 17-year-old Barbra Streisand from Brooklyn, and when [Parker] cast this Irish actress that was a trouble ... that was my only reservation; I really had envisioned she was a young Barbra Streisand, a Jewish girl." Parker and the casting department had difficulty finding an actress for the role of Hilary Van Doren. Antonia Franceschi, who was previously a background dancer in Grease (1978), secured the role based on the strength of her audition.

Designer Isaac Mizrahi, who was an 18-year-old drama major senior at the school, auditioned for the role of Montgomery. Although he didn't receive the role, Parker cast him in a minor role as the character Touchstone. Meg Tilly appears in her acting debut as a dancer. In his first credited screen role, Peter Rafelson, son of Bob Rafelson, plays as a musician and vocalist.

=== Filming ===
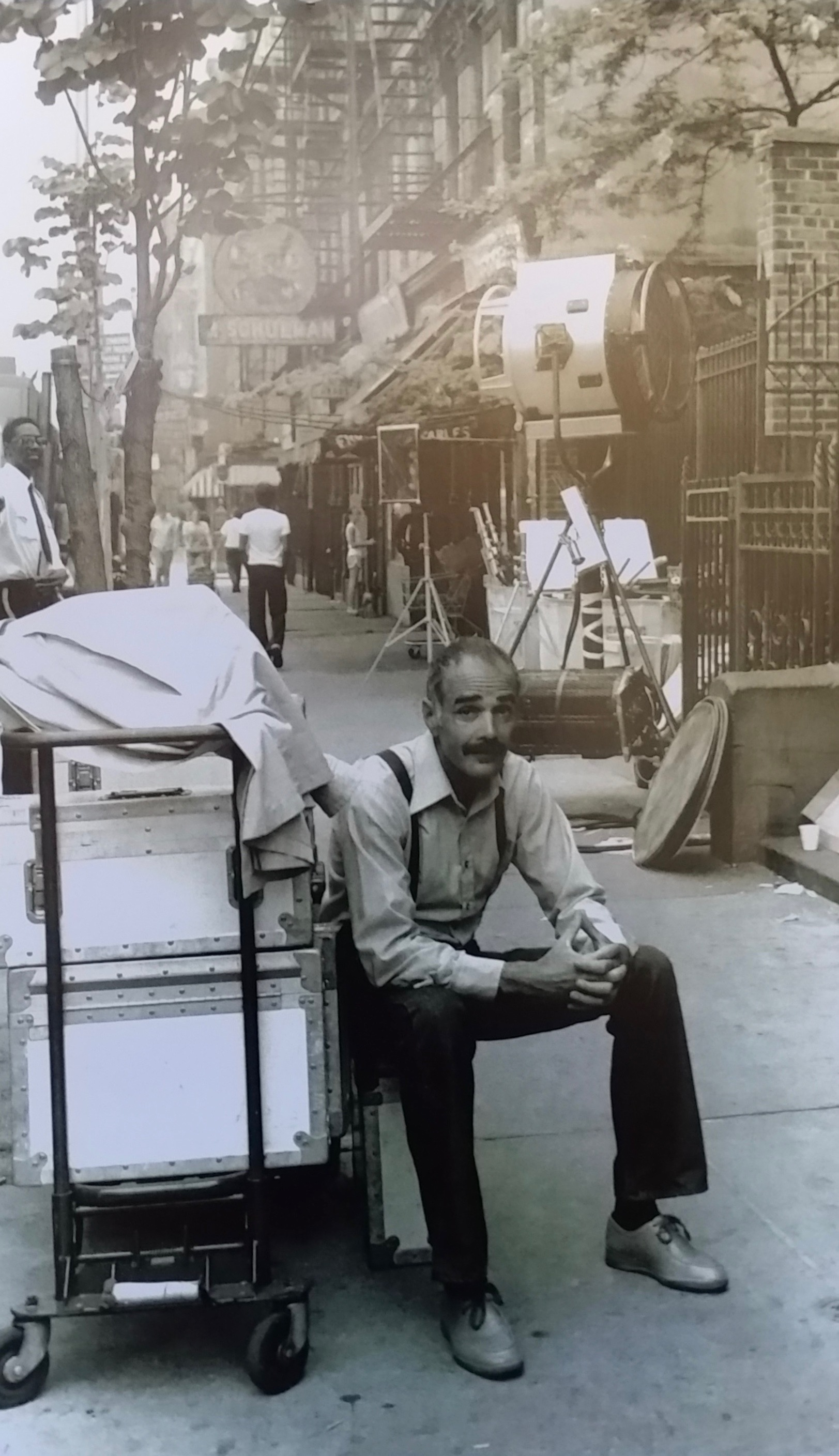
Producer David De Silva on 46th Street during principal photography in 1979.

Principal photography began on July 9, 1979, with a budget of $8.5 million. Parker described shooting in New York City as a less than pleasurable experience due to the intense summer weather conditions. He also faced difficulties with U.S. labor union representatives who disapproved of the British crew members working on the film without permits. In order to gain work permits, Parker made an agreement with the unions that allowed local laborers to work on the film.

During filming, the crew and several cast members objected to cinematographer Michael Seresin and camera operator John Stanier's European style of single-source lighting, which involved the use of smoke from incense burners to diffuse the light. In response, representatives of the Screen Actors Guild (SAG) and the International Alliance of Theatrical Stage Employees (IATSE) halted the production, and forbade Parker from using smoke on the set.

The filmmakers had originally planned to shoot the film at the Performing Arts school, but were denied by the Board of Education over the content of the script. After consulting with Nancy Littlefield, the head of the New York City Mayor's Office of Film, Theater and Broadcasting, Parker was granted a meeting with the Board's members, who explained that they were concerned with the script's profanity, sexual content and depictions of drug use, as well as his depiction of Turkish prisons in Midnight Express. After the filmmakers expressed interest in moving the production to Chicago, Littlefield reviewed abandoned-city properties and discovered two unused schools, Haaren High School and Performance Space 122. Both schools were converted and used for all the interior scenes. MGM spent approximately $200,000 transforming Haaren High into a sound stage, with carpentry shops and production offices. The location was used to shoot the film's finale, a graduation ceremony. The sequence was filmed in four days, and employed 400 extras and 150 student musicians.

The exterior of the school was shot using the left wing of the Church of Saint Mary the Virgin building almost directly opposite the real school on West 46th Street in Times Square. The Rocky Horror Picture Show midnight screening sequence was filmed at the 8th Street Playhouse located on 52 West 8th Street, New York. Sal Piro, president of The Rocky Horror Picture Show Fan Club, appears as an emcee at the screening. Parker later hired Steadicam inventor and operator Garrett Brown to film Doris and Ralph's dialogue scene in a New York City Subway station. Montgomery MacNeil's apartment was located on 1564 Broadway, at West 46th Street in Manhattan.

The "Fame" musical number was filmed on 46th Street in three days, with eight choreographed routines, 150 student background actors and 50 professional dancers. The dancers performed to the Donna Summer song "Hot Stuff", as the song "Fame" had not yet been written. Before the sequence was filmed, Stanier left the production for personal reasons. During filming, Seresin chose to operate the camera himself for several hours before International Alliance of Theatrical Stage Employees (IATSE) representatives visited the set, and advised Parker that a cinematographer was forbidden to operate a camera, and that the production would be shut down permanently if he did not hire an operator from their union. The following day, the New York Police Department demanded that the cast and crew take a 4:00 p.m. curfew due to complaints of traffic blockages. In addition, the dancers demanded extra pay for performing stunts on top of taxicabs. Principal photography concluded after 91 days.

=== Music ===
The music was composed by Michael Gore. Parker had originally approached Giorgio Moroder, who had previously worked on Midnight Express, and Jeff Lynne, the lead performer of Electric Light Orchestra (ELO), both of whom had declined. The musical numbers were performed practically on set, as Parker wanted to avoid dubbing during post-production. The song "Hot Lunch Jam" was heavily improvised. Parker explained, "This song evolved from an all day session involving groups of kids from all disciplines, as we cobbled together the song with everyone chipping in their contributions." The filming of the "Fame" musical number inspired Gore to write an original song inspired by Donna Summer. He and lyricist Dean Pitchford spent one month writing the lyrics. Pitchford improvised the lyrics "I'm gonna live forever", inspired by a line of dialogue from the 1964 play Dylan. During the recording sessions, Luther Vandross acted as the song's contractor, in charge of the backup vocals. He improvised the lyrics "Remember, remember, remember", and performed it with backing vocalists Vivian Cherry and Vicki Sue Robinson. The song was later incorporated into the filmed dance sequence during post-production.

Parker wanted the film to end with a huge musical number that would showcase every character. While drafting the script during pre-production, he was partially inspired by the ELO song, "Eldorado". Parker turned to Gore and Pitchford, requesting that they write a song that would combine the film's three musical elements: gospel, rock and classical. The resulting song, "I Sing the Body Electric", was named by Pitchford after the same-titled poem from Walt Whitman's "Leaves of Grass" collection.

== Release ==
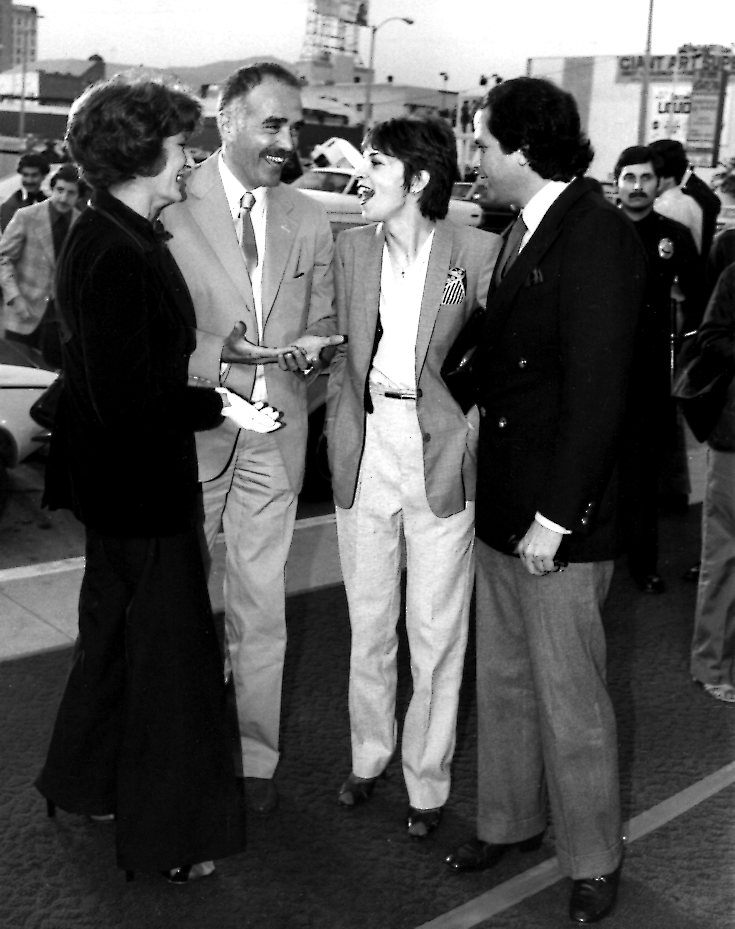
Opening Night of the film Fame (Los Angeles, May 1980) Dolores Quinton, Producer David De Silva, Cindy Williams and Jim Schreiber in front of the theater

Fame premiered at the Ziegfeld Theatre on May 12, 1980. MGM issued a platform release, which involved opening the film in select cities for limited showings, before releasing it nationwide. The studio was concerned with the film's cast of then-unknown actors, and felt that the limited theatrical run would generate strong word-of-mouth support from critics and audiences. On May 16, 1980, Fame premiered at the Cinerama Dome Theatre in Hollywood, and opened in limited release in New York, Toronto and Los Angeles. MGM spent more than $2 million on an advertising campaign that placed emphasis on the film's music. The studio also allowed select theatre chains to give out free tickets for special screenings. Fame was released nationwide on June 20, 1980, distributed by MGM through United Artists. In the United States and Canada, it grossed $21,202,829, and was the thirty-second highest-grossing film of 1980. By April 1981, the film had grossed $20.4 million overseas and was expected to gross $29 million, giving it a worldwide gross of between $42-$50 million.

=== Home media ===
Fame was released on VHS, Laserdisc, and CED videodisc in March 1981, by MGM/CBS Home Video. In 1986, the distribution rights to the film were transferred to Turner Entertainment Co., which acquired MGM's pre-May 1986 library of feature films. Currently, the rights are owned by Warner Bros., after its parent company Time Warner acquired Turner's library of MGM films in 1996. The film was released on DVD on June 3, 2003, by Warner Home Video. Special features for the DVD include an audio commentary by Parker, a branching video featuring interviews with Parker and several cast members, a making-of featurette, a short documentary on the High School of Performing Arts, production notes, and the theatrical trailer. As a tie-in to the home video release of MGM's 2009 remake, Warner Home Video released the film on Blu-ray on January 26, 2010. The Blu-ray presents the film in 1080p high definition, and contains all the additional materials found on the 2003 DVD release, including a CD "soundtrack sampler" that previews four musical numbers from the soundtrack album.

== Reception ==
=== Critical response ===
On the review aggregation website Rotten Tomatoes, Fame holds an approval rating of 81% based on 37 reviews, with an average score of 7/10. The website's consensus reads, "Just because Fame is a well-acted musical doesn't mean it flinches against its surprisingly heavy topics." Metacritic, which uses a weighted average, assigned the film a score of 58 out of 100, based on 12 critics, indicating "mixed or average" reviews. Although initial reactions among film critics were mixed, Barry Miller received critical acclaim for his performance. Jack Matthews of the Associated Press wrote "Barry Miller bolts from the screen with a performance that will etch itself into the viewer's mind for a long time to come" Gene Siskel of the Chicago Tribune awarded the film two-and-a-half stars out of four, writing, "When the kids perform, the movie sings, but their fictionalized personal stories are melodramatic drivel."

Dave Kehr of the Chicago Reader wrote, "The film is cut at such a frenzied pitch that it's often possible to believe (mistakenly) that something significant is going on." Variety magazine wrote: "The great strength of the film is in the school scenes – when it wanders away from the scholastic side as it does with increasing frequency as the overlong feature moves along, it loses dramatic intensity and slows the pace." Roger Ebert of the Chicago Sun-Times awarded the film three-and-a-half stars out of four writing, "Fame is a genuine treasure, moving and entertaining, a movie that understands being a teen-ager as well as Breaking Away did, but studies its characters in a completely different milieu." William Gallagher, in his review for the BBC, wrote, "Alan Parker manages to make this a fairly horrible story even while it remains entertaining. You come away from it with all your preconceptions about the glamour of showbusiness wiped away and you can't help but admire the characters who get through."

=== Accolades ===
Award	Category	Nominee(s)	Result	Ref.
Academy Awards	Best Screenplay – Written Directly for the Screen	Christopher Gore	Nominated	
Academy Awards	Best Film Editing	Gerry Hambling	Nominated	
Academy Awards	Best Original Score	Michael Gore	Won	
Academy Awards	Best Original Song	"Fame"; Music by Michael Gore; Lyrics by Dean Pitchford	Won	
Academy Awards	Best Original Song	"Out Here on My Own"; Music by Michael Gore; Lyrics by Lesley Gore	Nominated	
Academy Awards	Best Sound	Michael J. Kohut, Aaron Rochin, Jay M. Harding, and Chris Newman	Nominated	
American Cinema Editors Awards	Best Edited Feature Film	Gerry Hambling	Nominated	
British Academy Film Awards	Best Direction	Alan Parker	Nominated	
British Academy Film Awards	Best Editing	Gerry Hambling	Nominated	
British Academy Film Awards	Best Original Film Music	Michael Gore	Nominated	
British Academy Film Awards	Best Sound	Chris Newman, Les Wiggins, and Michael J. Kohut	Won	
César Awards	Best Foreign Film	Alan Parker	Nominated	
Golden Globe Awards	Best Motion Picture – Musical or Comedy		Nominated	
Golden Globe Awards	Best Actress in a Motion Picture – Musical or Comedy	Irene Cara	Nominated	
Golden Globe Awards	Best Original Score – Motion Picture	Michael Gore	Nominated	
Golden Globe Awards	Best Original Song – Motion Picture	"Fame"; Music by Michael Gore; Lyrics by Dean Pitchford	Won	
Grammy Awards	Song of the Year	"Fame" – Michael Gore and Dean Pitchford	Nominated	
Grammy Awards	Best Pop Vocal Performance, Female	"Fame" – Irene Cara	Nominated	
Grammy Awards	Best Album of Original Score Written for a Motion Picture or a Television Special	Fame – Michael Gore, Anthony Evans, Paul McCrane, Dean Pitchford, Lesley Gore, and Robert F. Colesberry	Nominated	
NAACP Image Awards	Outstanding Motion Picture		Won	
Writers Guild of America Awards	Best Drama – Written Directly for the Screen	Christopher Gore	Nominated	
Young Artist Awards	Best Family Music Album	Fame	Nominated	
Young Artist Awards	Best Young Actor in a Major Motion Picture	Paul McCrane	Nominated	
Young Artist Awards	Best Young Actor in a Major Motion Picture	Barry Miller	Nominated	

== Franchise ==
Following the film's release, a television spin-off, Fame, aired on the NBC network for two seasons from January 7, 1982, to August 4, 1983. The series was then renewed for first-run syndication, and four additional seasons were produced. Returning cast members from the film included Lee Curreri, Albert Hague, Gene Anthony Ray and Debbie Allen. The show's popularity, particularly in the United Kingdom, led to the formation of a music group, The Kids from "Fame". The main vocalists were Allen, Ray, Curerri, Valerie Landsburg, Erica Gimpel, Carlo Imperato, and Lori Singer. In 1982, the band released two albums, The Kids from "Fame" and The Kids from "Fame" Again, which were largely successful in the United Kingdom. The band members also went on tour, performing as their characters live on stage. After the series was renewed, The Kids from "Fame" produced three additional albums, all of which proved less successful and resulted in the band members parting ways to pursue other projects. As the series had been in production at the time of MGM's spinoff from Turner Entertainment, MGM retained the rights to the Fame intellectual property.

In 1987, producer David De Silva announced he was developing a stage version of the film. Fame the Musical was the first professional production at the Coconut Grove Playhouse in Miami in 1988. The show then played at the Walnut Street Theatre in Philadelphia from March 25 through April 29, 1989. The musical has since been produced in over 25 countries.

In 1997, MGM Television produced a second series inspired by the film. Fame L.A., created by Richard B. Lewis, focused on the lives of several students attending a drama and dance school in Los Angeles. The series featured Christian Kane, Roselyn Sánchez, William R. Moses, and Lesli Margherita in starring roles. It aired in syndication from October 19, 1997, to March 21, 1998.

In 2002, MGM and Touchstone Television planned to develop a two-hour television film that would serve as a direct sequel to Fame, followed by a spin-off television series. Both projects were to be produced for the ABC network. The television film was to introduce several students applying for positions at the New York City of Performing Arts, while the spin-off series would focus on their lives during their four years of attending the school. The series would feature new cast members as the young students, as well as those from the 1980 film, as well as updated versions of the songs "Fame" and "Out Here on My Own". Michael Gore was to act as an executive producer for both projects with his producing partner Lawrence Cohen, through their production label White Cap Productions. However, both television projects were never produced.

In 2003, MGM Television produced a reality television series titled Fame, in an attempt to capitalize on the success of the largely popular American Idol. The concept of the series involves discovering a "triple threat"—a person who can sing, act and dance and has a "bigger-than-life" personality. The show, co-hosted by Debbie Allen, and Joey Fatone, featured Carnie Wilson, Johnny Wright and JoJo Wright as the panel of judges. The series premiered on NBC on May 28, 2003, and a total of ten episode were produced. The two competing finalists of the series were Shannon Bex and Harlemm Lee. Lee emerged as the winner of the competition, based on home-audience votes.

In 2012, MGM Television announced it would produce a modern-day television series inspired by the film, with Nigel Lythgoe acting as an executive producer. The project resurfaced in June 2015, when The Hollywood Reporter announced that MGM Television would be co-producing the series with A&E Networks for Lifetime, with Josh Safran attached as the show's writer and executive producer.

=== Remake ===
In 2009, MGM and Lakeshore Entertainment produced a remake of Fame directed by Kevin Tancharoen, and written by Allison Burnett. The remake followed the premise of the original film, depicting the lives of several students as they attend the New York City High School of Performing Arts. Debbie Allen was the only cast member from the 1980 film to have a supporting role, appearing as the school's principal. The film was notable for its lighter tone, in contrast to the earlier film's gritty subject matter. Released on September 25, 2009, Fame received generally unfavorable reviews from mainstream film critics. It was a modest box office success upon release in the United States, though it fared better internationally, grossing $54.7 million worldwide. Parker voiced his disapproval of the remake and described it as an "awful" film. Maureen Teefy also criticized the film, stating, "They're using the same formula, but it doesn't have the same substance. It's not staying true to the grittiness and authenticity of the original."

=== Future ===
In April 2023, after previously acquiring MGM, Amazon announced plans to expand the franchise with television series in development from Amazon Studios.

== Aftermath and legacy ==
Fame and Pennies From Heaven were the last films to be produced by MGM, before the studio merged with United Artists in 1981. The film has been credited with revitalizing the teen musical subgenre by adding dramatic elements into its story, echoing 1950s melodramas. Its presentation of musical numbers in the style of a music video was a major influence on other 1980s films in the dance film genre, such as Flashdance (1983), Footloose (1984) and Dirty Dancing (1987). It also inspired the creation of other similar performing arts schools around the world, including the Liverpool Institute for Performing Arts (LIPA), and the BRIT School.

The film and its title song helped launch Irene Cara's musical career. She recorded three solo albums and contributed to several film soundtracks, notably performing "Flashdance...What a Feeling", the title song for Flashdance, for which she won the Academy Award for Best Original Song. Paul McCrane, Meg Tilly, and Barry Miller (who won the Tony Award in 1985 for Neil Simon's "Biloxi Blues") went on to successful acting careers, while Gene Anthony Ray, Debbie Allen and Lee Curerri found success and popularity with the television series.

Ray struggled with drug and alcohol addictions, and worked sporadically after the series ended in 1987. In 1996, he was diagnosed as HIV-positive and died after a stroke on November 14, 2003.

The film was Christopher Gore's only original screenplay. He was also involved with the 1982 television series as its creator, and wrote several episodes before his death from AIDS on May 18, 1988.

After Fame, Louis Falco continued to work as a commercial choreographer for several music videos and films. He again collaborated with Parker on the 1987 film Angel Heart before his death from AIDS on March 26, 1993.

In 2004, the American Film Institute (AFI) ranked the song "Fame" at #51 on its "100 Years...100 Songs" list. In 2006, AFI placed the film on its "100 Years...100 Cheers" list, where it was ranked #92. The film also ranked #42 on Entertainment Weekly's list of the "50 Best High School Movies". In 2014, IndieWire added the song "Fame" to its list of "The 20 Greatest Movie Theme Songs of the 1980s".

In 2023, the film was selected for preservation to the National Film Registry by the Library of Congress after being deemed "culturally, historically, or aesthetically significant".

== See also ==
=== Other films released during the late 1970s disco and jukebox movie musical craze ===
- Car Wash (1976)
- Saturday Night Fever (1977)
- FM (1978)
- Sgt. Pepper's Lonely Hearts Club Band (1978)
- Thank God It's Friday (1978)
- Skatetown, U.S.A. (1979)
- Roller Boogie (1979)
- Xanadu (1980)
- Can't Stop the Music (1980)
- Get Rollin' (1980), roller disco documentary
