= Christopher Gore (writer) =

American dramatist

Christopher "Chris" Gore (1944–1988) was an American screenwriter, playwright, and lyricist. Gore is best known for writing the screenplay for the 1980 musical film Fame, for which he received a nomination for the Academy Award for Best Original Screenplay.

Gore was born on August 10, 1944, in Fort Lauderdale, Florida. Shortly after graduating from Northwestern University, Gore began writing plays and musicals. One of his early works, Mary, was a musical about Mary, Queen of Scots that was produced in Fort Lauderdale, Florida in 1967. His first Broadway show, Via Galactica, which he wrote with Judith Ross and Galt MacDermot, premiered in 1972. In 1977, he also wrote the book and lyrics for a musical about the Egyptian queen Nefertiti.

Although his obituary in The New York Times (citing his mother) stated that Gore died of cancer, subsequent reports now accurately state that he died of AIDS on May 18, 1988, at age 43 in Santa Monica, California.
