= High School of Performing Arts =

The High School of Performing Arts
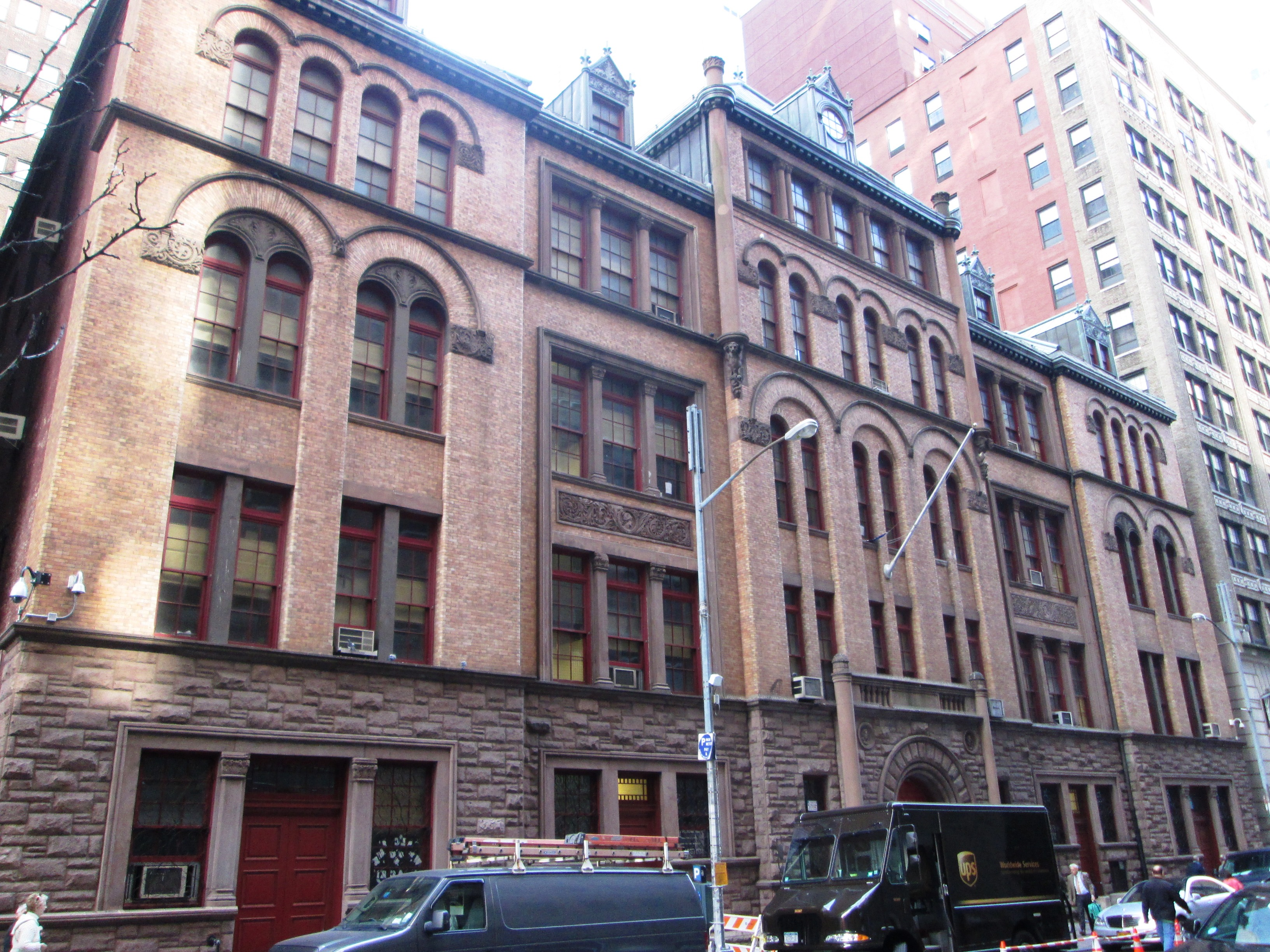
- The school building in October 2013, now occupied by the Jacqueline Kennedy Onassis High School for International Careers

Location
- 120 West 46th Street; New York City, New York; United States; 40°45′27.7″N 73°59′00″W

Information
- Type: Public Alternative High school
- Established: 1947
- Founder: Franklin J. Keller
- Status: closed
- Closed: 1984
- Campus: Urban
- Merged with: High School of Music & Art
- To form: Fiorello H. LaGuardia High School of Music & Arts
- Website: highschoolofperformingartsalumni.com

The High School of Performing Arts (informally known as "PA") was a public alternative high school established in 1947 and located at 120 West 46th Street in the borough of Manhattan, New York City, from 1948 to 1984.

In 1961, the school was merged with another alternative arts school, the High School of Music & Art, while each retained its own campus. Plans for establishing a joint building for the merged schools took many years to be realized. There was opposition to the loss of PA's individual identity, but both student bodies eventually moved into a shared building in 1984, and renamed the Fiorello H. LaGuardia High School of Music & Art and Performing Arts.

Many well-known performers were trained at the school, such as Eartha Kitt, Liza Minnelli, Jennifer Aniston, Ving Rhames, Lorraine Toussaint, and Suzanne Vega.

The 1980 film Fame was set in the High School of Performing Arts, though the building was not used in filming.

== History ==
=== Early years ===
This school was created in 1947 by educator and creative thinker Franklin J. Keller, as a part of Metropolitan Vocational High School, using his staff and administrators on the Lower East Side of Manhattan. Under Keller's stewardship, it offered music and theater arts programs in addition to the traditional "trade" skills.

In 1948, the school occupied Public School 46, a disused 1894 public school building on West 46th Street in the Times Square area. The new school offered programs in music, dance, drama, and, for a time, photography. There were many professionals on staff, including the young Sidney Lumet in the drama department. His production in 1948 was The Young & Fair.

=== Development of a new building and a joint school ===
Beginning in the mid-1950s, the New York City administration announced plans to move PA out of its ancient building and into new quarters. These plans evolved to joining the student body with that of the High School of Music & Art (“M&A”) in a newly constructed building. A site in the Lincoln Square area was chosen, eventually settling to within the newly developed Lincoln Center complex. A groundbreaking ceremony was held in 1958, where Mayor Robert F. Wagner and the City Council publicly promised completion by 1964. In anticipation of this, PA and M&A formally merged in 1961 as "sister schools" on paper while retaining their respective campuses. In 1969, the combined institution was coined the Fiorello H. LaGuardia High School of Music & Art and Performing Arts, named after the founder of M&A.

PA continued to audition, educate, and graduate students in its old location during these decades of uncertainty. In 1973, ground was again broken for a new building at Lincoln Center, but New York City's budget crisis forced all construction to be suspended until the early 1980s. Finally, in September 1984, the Fiorello H. LaGuardia High School of Music & Art and Performing Arts welcomed students from both schools into their new building.

=== Opposition to merger with the High School for Music & Art ===
Performing Arts High School and Music & Art High School had become two distinctly different schools: One was a performing arts school preparing students to become professional stage performers, while the other was a fine arts school, preparing students to become professional gallery or concert artists. In 1978, alumni Nick Gordon and Carol (Rubin) Gordon, members of the parents association, began the school's first Alumni Association with the goal of lobbying for the continued separate existence of PA. They feared a school which had 450–500 students in the 1950s at the original site, and which had grown to just 600–800 students at 46th Street, would lose its quirky identity in a massive educational complex three times its size. The Alumni Association met opposition, however, from the Board of Education's Chancellor Frank J. Macchiarola and other school administrators. Macchiarola had overseen the "marriage into one single Fiorello La Guardia house" of sister schools PA and M&A in the first place.

Mr. Gordon's next attempt to preserve PA was to enlist the help of an architect, Sheldon Licht (who was also a member of the parent's association), in beginning the process to declare the school building a New York City Landmark. In 1982 the building was ultimately declared a New York City Landmark but it was too late to preserve PA as a separate institution, as construction on the new building had begun again in earnest.

=== End of individual School for the Performing Arts ===
In June 1984, the last graduating class from the "old building" departed; in September of that year, current and incoming students moved to the Lincoln Center site. The two schools were finally united in one building, publicly identified as the Fiorello H. LaGuardia High School of Music & Art and Performing Arts. Performing Arts High School had at last vacated its old building, joining students from Music & Art High School to become one single entity.

In winter 1988, the vacant PA building at 120 West 46th Street caught fire during renovation. Its facade and several exterior walls survived; the interior needed complete reconstruction. It reopened in 1995 as the Jacqueline Kennedy Onassis School of International Careers.

== Film and TV Show ==
In 1980 the motion picture Fame based loosely on student and faculty life at PA, premiered. In 2009 a remake was released. Following the success of the motion picture, a TV show named Fame premiered on 1982 and lasted 6 seasons. External shot of the building was used in the opening credits.

== See also ==
- List of New York City Designated Landmarks in Manhattan from 14th to 59th Streets
- National Register of Historic Places listings in Manhattan from 14th to 59th Streets
