= Cover to Cover tour =

1991 concert tour by George Michael

Cover to Cover
- World tour by George Michael
- Tour itinerary cover
- Location: Europe; South America; Asia; North America
- Start date: 15 January 1991
- End date: 31 October 1991
- Legs: 3
- No. of shows: 29
- Guests: Elton John; Andrew Ridgeley

George Michael concert chronology
- The Faith Tour (1988–89); Cover to Cover (1991); 25 Live (2006–08)

The Cover to Cover tour was the second solo concert tour by English singer-songwriter George Michael. The tour spanned 9 months between January and October 1991, comprising 29 shows across the United Kingdom, Brazil, Japan, Canada and the United States.

A cover version of "Don't Let the Sun Go Down on Me", a 1974 song by Elton John, recorded during the tour, was released in November 1991, and became a massive hit on both sides of the Atlantic. Michael and John had performed the song together at the Live Aid concert in 1985, and again at Michael's concert at Wembley Arena on 23 March 1991, where the duet was recorded. In April 1993, live performances of "Killer", "Papa Was a Rollin' Stone" and "Calling You" formed part of the Five Live EP which again topped the UK Singles Chart. His next tour happened only 15 years later.

== Background ==
In September 1990, George Michael released his second solo studio album, Listen Without Prejudice Vol. 1. Following his decision to be taken more seriously as a songwriter, Michael refused to do any promotion for the album.

The North American portion of the tour was originally scheduled to begin on 6 February 1991 at the Massey Hall in Toronto, Ontario, concluding on 20 February in Los Angeles, but was postponed until late 1991. The tour finally began on 15 January 1991 at the NEC Arena in Birmingham, England, and concluded on 31 October at the Capital Centre in Landover, Maryland. The tour was not a proper promotion for Listen Without Prejudice Vol. 1; rather, it was more about Michael singing covers of his favourite songs.

On 25 and 27 January 1991, Michael headlined the Rock in Rio II festival. He was joined by his ex-Wham! bandmate, Andrew Ridgeley, the second night.

== Critical reception ==
In a review of the 5 October 1991 concert at the Forum in Inglewood, California, Richard Cromelin of the Los Angeles Times wrote, "[...] at the Forum on Saturday, everything was as charged as ever in Georgeland: a screaming, sellout crowd, a hard-working star and hit after hit (so what if they were mostly three years old and more?)." He noted, "When the curtain rose, Michael was posed as the moody pop icon sporting his trademark sunglasses and five-o'clock shadow. But in what might serve as a metaphor for his self-liberation, he soon scrapped the male-model attitude and spent the rest of the show smiling and chatting with unpretentious warmth."

In a review of the concerts held at the Madison Square Garden in New York City for The New York Times, Stephen Holden opined that, "while the program's range and its taste in material showed Mr. Michael to be a dedicated student of contemporary pop-soul music, his performances rarely came close to matching the power of the original hit versions. [...] The show's better moments were Mr. Michael's performances of original songs that have the same mixture of traditional pop formality and soulful emotiveness as his singing. A version of the Wham! hit 'Everything She Wants', arranged in an early Motown style, and the evening's final encore, 'Freedom! '90', a proclamation of personal liberation, which became a spirited audience sing-along, proved to be the evening's peppy high points."

== Recordings ==
The four Wembley Arena performances during 19–23 March 1991 were professionally recorded for a commercial release of the tour. A cover version of "Don't Let the Sun Go Down on Me", a duet with Elton John, was recorded on 23 March, and was later released as a single in November 1991. Performances of "Killer", "Papa Was a Rollin' Stone" and "Calling You" were released as part of the Five Live EP, released on 19 April 1993. A performance of "Tonight" was featured on the Two Rooms: Celebrating the Songs of Elton John & Bernie Taupin compilation album.

According to David Austin, whom Michael called his best friend in the A Different Story documentary, "There are 22 or 23 live tracks from the Cover to Cover tour that are simply amazing, finished and mixed and have never been heard before."

== Set list ==
1. "Killer" / "Papa Was a Rollin' Stone"
2. "Victims"
3. "Father Figure"
4. "Fame"
5. "Waiting for That Day"
6. "Ain't No Stoppin' Us Now"
7. "Living for the City"
8. "Hard Day"
9. "Calling You"
10. "Back to Life"
11. "Faith"
12. "Superstition"
13. "Tonight"
14. "Why Did You Do It?"
15. "Baby, Don't Change Your Mind"
16. "Everything She Wants"
17. "Desperado"
18. "Mother's Pride"
19. "What a Fool Believes"
20. "Freedom"
21. "Ain't Nobody"
22. "I'm Your Man"
23. "Sign Your Name"
24. "Don't Let the Sun Go Down on Me"
25. "I Knew You Were Waiting (For Me)"
26. "Careless Whisper"
27. "They Won't Go When I Go"
28. "Freedom! '90"

== Tour dates ==
List of concerts, showing date, city, country, venue, tickets sold, number of available tickets, and amount of gross revenue
Date	City	Country	Venue	Attendance	Gross
Europe
15 January 1991	Birmingham	England	NEC Arena	—N/a	—N/a
16 January 1991	Birmingham	England	NEC Arena	—N/a	—N/a
South America
25 January 1991 (Note: The concerts on 25 and 27 January 1991, at the Maracanã Stadium in Rio de Janeiro are part of Rock in Rio.)	Rio de Janeiro	Brazil	Maracanã Stadium	—N/a	—N/a
27 January 1991	Rio de Janeiro	Brazil	Maracanã Stadium	—N/a	—N/a
Asia
6 March 1991	Tokyo	Japan	Tokyo Dome	—N/a	—N/a
7 March 1991	Tokyo	Japan	Tokyo Dome	—N/a	—N/a
9 March 1991	Tokyo	Japan	Tokyo Dome	—N/a	—N/a
10 March 1991	Tokyo	Japan	Tokyo Dome	—N/a	—N/a
Europe
19 March 1991	London	England	Wembley Arena	—N/a	—N/a
20 March 1991	London	England	Wembley Arena	—N/a	—N/a
22 March 1991	London	England	Wembley Arena	—N/a	—N/a
23 March 1991	London	England	Wembley Arena	—N/a	—N/a
North America
1 October 1991	Oakland	United States	Oakland–Alameda County Coliseum Arena	—N/a	—N/a
2 October 1991	Sacramento	United States	ARCO Arena	—N/a	—N/a
5 October 1991	Inglewood	United States	Great Western Forum	27,145 / 27,145	$622,553
6 October 1991	Inglewood	United States	Great Western Forum	27,145 / 27,145	$622,553
9 October 1991	Tacoma	United States	Tacoma Dome	—N/a	—N/a
10 October 1991	Vancouver	Canada	Pacific Coliseum	—N/a	—N/a
13 October 1991	Denver	United States	McNichols Sports Arena	—N/a	—N/a
15 October 1991	Houston	United States	The Summit	—N/a	—N/a
16 October 1991	Dallas	United States	Reunion Arena	—N/a	—N/a
18 October 1991	Auburn Hills	United States	The Palace of Auburn Hills	—N/a	—N/a
20 October 1991	Rosemont	United States	Rosemont Horizon	10,054 / 14,417	$256,648
22 October 1991	Toronto	Canada	Maple Leaf Gardens	14,201 / 14,201	$364,800
25 October 1991	New York City	United States	Madison Square Garden	29,031 / 29,031	$752,685
26 October 1991	New York City	United States	Madison Square Garden	29,031 / 29,031	$752,685
28 October 1991	Worcester	United States	Worcester Centrum	—N/a	—N/a
29 October 1991	Philadelphia	United States	The Spectrum	11,248 / 14,570	$256,955
31 October 1991	Landover	United States	Capital Centre	—N/a	—N/a

== Personnel ==
As printed in the official Japanese tour programme:

- Chris Cameron – Musical Director
- Deon Estus – Bass/Vocals
- Andy Hamilton – Keys/Saxophone
- Danny Cummings – Percussion
- David Clayton – Keyboards
- Martin Bliss – Guitar
- Danny Jacob – Guitar
- Jonathan Moffett – Drums
- Lynn Mabry – Background Vocals
- Shirlie Lewis – Background Vocals
- Jay Henry – Background Vocals
- Rob Kahane – Personal Manager
- Nicholas Brown/Stephen Brackman – Business Managers
- Alan Zullo – Tour Manager
- Ken Watts – Tour Coordinator
- Jake Duncan – Artist's Liaison
- Rich Mayne – Production Manager
- Tom Armstrong – Stage Manager
- Lauren Murphy – Asst. Tour Manager
- Ronnie Franklin – Head of Security
- Danny Francis – Security
- Paul Dallanecra – Security
- Melanie Panayiotou – Hair & Makeup
- Alan Keyes – Wardrobe
- Julie Chertow – Masseuse—Brazil/Japan
- Benji Lefevre – House Sound Engineer
- Chris Wade-Evans – Monitor Engineer
- Roy Bennett – Lighting Designer
- Gary Westcott – Varilite Operator
- D.J. Howes – Tour Programmer/Keys
- Dave Newton – Keyboard Tech
- Nick Sizer – Percussion Tech
- Ade Wilson – Guitar Tech
- Dikka Jones – Guitar Tech
- Paul Davies – Drum Tech
- Bernie Kearns – Projection Operator
- Paddy Fitzpatrick – Stage Set/Carpenter
- Mike Allison – Senior Audio Tech
- Edward Harbin – Audio Tech
- Dave Conyers – Audio Tech
- Peter Currier – Lighting Tech
- Peter Parchment – Lighting Tech
- Steve Rusling – Lighting Tech
- Tim Dunn – Lighting Tech
- Nicola Burton – Lighting Tech
- Winterland Productions – Merchandising
- Russell Young, Bradford Branson – Photography
- George Michael & Simon Halfon – Design

== Wembley Arena, March 19/20/22/23 1991 promotional cassette ==
A free exclusive cassette was given to audience members at the Wembley Arena concerts between 19 and 23 March. It contained one previously unreleased track, a cover of "I Believe (When I Fall in Love It Will Be Forever)", which was later released as a B-side to "Don't Let the Sun Go Down on Me".

Cassette track listing

1. "I Believe (When I Fall in Love It Will Be Forever)" (previously unreleased)
2. "Freedom" (Back to Reality mix)
3. "If You Were My Woman" (live at Wembley Stadium, 11 Jun 1988)
4. "Fantasy"
