= Soul Free =

1991 single by George Michael

- Artwork for the Australian CD release

Single by George Michael

from the album Listen Without Prejudice Vol. 1
- B-side: "Cowboys and Angels" (radio edit); "Freedom! '90"; "Praying for Time"
- Written: June 1990
- Released: April 1991
- Genre: Pop; funk; blue-eyed soul
- Length: 5:30 (album version); 4:19 (special radio edit)
- Label: Epic; Columbia
- Songwriter: George Michael
- Producer: George Michael

George Michael singles chronology
"Cowboys and Angels" (1991)	"Soul Free" (1991)	"Don't Let the Sun Go Down on Me" (1991)

Licensed audio
- "Soul Free" on YouTube

"Soul Free" is a song by English singer-songwriter George Michael, released in 1991 in various territories as the final single from his second solo studio album, Listen Without Prejudice Vol. 1 (1990).

== Release ==
In April 1991, "Soul Free" was released as a cassette single in North America by Columbia Records under the catalogue number 38T 73799, featuring an edited version of "Cowboys and Angels" as the B-side. In Japan, the single was released in the mini CD format by Epic Records on 1 June. In Australia, "Soul Free" was issued as a CD and cassette single on 8 July, featuring "Praying for Time" and "Freedom! '90" as the B-sides.

"Soul Free" reached number 95 on the ARIA singles chart.

== Critical reception ==
In a review for the Gavin Report, critic Dave Sholin wrote, "Whether it's stirring, introspective pieces or light hearted, upbeat creations such as this Reggae-tinged track, it's always a musical adventure when it comes to the genius of George Michael."

"Soul Free" received positive commentary in retrospective reviews. In its 2003 reappraisal of Listen Without Prejudice Vol. 1, Slant Magazine noted the song as "the only bona fide uptempo tune besides 'Freedom! '90'," and praised its hip-hop rhythm, "reggae-inflected" melody and Michael's "signature bouncy keyboards and falsetto." In a 2020 review for BBC Online, Nick Levine wrote that "the house-flecked 'Soul Free' [...] shimmered with the possibility of a semi-illicit thrill as Michael sang in an ecstatic falsetto: 'When you touch me baby, I don't have no choice, oh that sweet temptation in your voice!'"

== Track listings ==
All tracks are written by George Michael.

North American cassette single
No.	Title	Length
1.	"Soul Free"	5:24
2.	"Cowboys and Angels" (radio edit)	4:34

US promotional CD single
No.	Title	Length
1.	"Soul Free" (special radio edit)	4:19
2.	"Cowboys and Angels" (radio edit)	4:34

Japanese mini CD single
No.	Title	Length
1.	"Soul Free"	5:26
2.	"Cowboys and Angels" (radio edit)	4:35

Australian CD and cassette single
No.	Title	Length
1.	"Soul Free"	5:30
2.	"Freedom! '90"	6:30
3.	"Praying for Time"	4:40

== Personnel ==
Credits adapted from the Listen Without Prejudice Vol. 1 album liner notes.

- George Michael – vocals, bass, keyboards
- Tony Patler – keyboards
- Danny Cummings – percussion

== Charts ==
Weekly chart performance for "Soul Free"
Chart (1991)	Peak position
Australia (ARIA)	95

== Release history ==
Region	Date	Format(s)	Label(s)	Ref.
United States	April 1991	Cassette	Columbia	
Canada	April 1991	Cassette	Columbia	
Japan	1 June 1991	Mini CD	Epic	
Australia	8 July 1991	CD; cassette	Epic	
