= Camilla Nickerson =

English fashion editor and stylist (born 1965)

Camilla Nickerson (b. 1965) is an English fashion editor and stylist. Based in New York City, she has joined Vogue in 1992 where she works as a senior fashion editor.

Nickerson was born 1965 in England. Her father, David, was an antiques dealer who ran Bourdon House until his death in 1995. Nickerson's career in fashion began in London where she landed a job at Tatler in 1982 before moving to British Vogue, with a position as a fashion assistant at the age of 17. Her next role was as junior fashion editor at Harpers & Queen, where she assisted Hamish Bowles. She left the role in 1988 to freelance as a stylist.

Nickerson moved to New York in 1992 after being hired by Anna Wintour as a fashion editor for Vogue. The position began a decades-long career at the magazine, where she rose to the role of senior fashion editor. She appeared along with other long-time Vogue staffers as part of the 2024 docuseries In Vogue: The 90s.

Beyond her work as a fashion editor, Nickerson has worked in various capacities throughout the fashion industry. She served as the stylist on the music video for George Michel's single Freedom! '90 directed by David Fincher. In 1993, she appeared on the February cover of Vogue Italia in a photograph shot by Steven Meisel.

== Bibliography ==
- Nickerson, Camilla; Wakefield, Neville, eds. (1996). Fashion: photography of the nineties. Zurich Berlin New York: Scalo. ISBN 3931141268.
