= Panayiotou v Sony Music Entertainment (UK) Ltd. =

Law case in England

Panayiotou and others v Sony Music Entertainment (UK) Ltd. ([1994] ChD 142) was a contract and entertainment law case before the High Court of Justice's Chancery Division. The plaintiff, entertainer George Michael, argued that his recording contract constituted an unreasonable restraint of trade. Michael alleged that the defendant had failed to promote his album Listen Without Prejudice Vol. 1 with due vigour as punishment when the artist decided to downplay his status as a sex symbol. Michael described his situation as "professional slavery" because his contract required that he produce music and cede the copyright to Sony for many years, leaving him no control over how the music would be marketed nor placing a reciprocal requirement that the label invest in promotion. Had the case succeeded, it might have curtailed the practice of signing artists to multi-album contracts. The court wholly rejected the claims.

== Background ==
Georgios Panayiotou, known professionally as George Michael, signed with Innervision Records in 1982 at the age of eighteen as part of the then relatively unknown pop duo Wham!. Innervision were distributed by CBS Records. In 1984 this contract was nullified as part of a legal compromise wherein Wham! were obligated to produce up to eight new albums for CBS Records; the label and the contract were acquired by Sony Music Entertainment in 1987. Following Wham!'s success and subsequent break up, Michael renegotiated a new eight-album deal with Sony as a solo artist in 1988. This deal was further renegotiated in 1990 to reflect Michael's superstar status, achieving terms comparable to similarly high-grossing artists. Michael's first solo album, Faith, was released in 1987 and had sold 14 million copies by the time suit was filed; his second solo album, Listen Without Prejudice Vol. 1 was released in 1990 and had sold 5 million copies. Listen Without Prejudice represented a new direction for Michael, downplaying the sex symbol status he had cultivated with Wham! in favour of a more reserved identity purely as a serious musician; he decided not to place his highly recognisable image on the album cover and declined to appear in promotional videos. Michael alleged that Sony under-promoted his new album in response to these decisions. He further charged that the contract restricted him from seeking a new label and prevented him from managing his professional image as he saw fit. Michael described this imbalance of power and his long-term lack of control over his career as "professional slavery".

It was common practice in the recording industry to sign many emerging artists like Wham!, banking that long-term profits from the few commercial successes would cover the losses from promoting the remainder. A decision holding Michael's contract unenforceable could have dramatically reduced the expected return on investment for signing and promoting an emerging artist, leading to fears that the practice would end. Michael argued that the structure of the industry concentrated power in too few hands, and that these companies competed by selling music, but not in the terms offered to new artists. This led to an imbalance of power, where the artist was contractually obligated to produce a set number of albums of acceptable quality and cede copyright to the label, but the label did not bear a reciprocal obligation to market and promote the product, in accordance with the artist's wishes or otherwise.

Michael was advanced a sum of £1 million in February 1992 under the terms of the 1990 contract. This amount was returned to Sony in August of the same year in preparation for filing suit in October.

== Decision ==
Michael filed suit before the Chancery Division on 30 October 1992, and Justice Jonathan Parker issued a ruling on 1 June 1994. The plaintiff's claims were wholly rejected. Parker held that Michael's contracts were reasonable and fair, especially in consideration of his access to expert legal advice, several renegotiations, and terms comparable to the industry standard for an artist of his commercial success. There were five prongs to the justice's dismissal:

- the case was indeed such that the doctrine of restraint of trade would be applicable;
- the 1984 agreement was a compromise in good faith and the conditions obtained there would pertain to all subsequent renegotiations: there is a legitimate public interest in upholding such a compromise, and the suit fails at the initial hurdle;
- leaving aside the origin of the 1988 agreement, its provisions were justifiable: the label has a legitimate and enforceable recoupment interest in an exclusive contract of some duration;
- restraint of trade under Article 85 of the Treaty of Rome establishing the European Community concerns trade between member states, and was held not to apply; Article 222 governing property ownership, including intellectual property, would have superseded in any case;
- by activating its terms in requesting an advance in 1992, Michael affirmed the 1988 agreement.

In July 1995, Sony sold the contract to rival record companies Virgin Records and DreamWorks Records. Virgin granted worldwide rights when DreamWorks granted rights in the U.S. and Canada. All releases for these labels were co-labeled with Aegean Records, a record company owned by George Michael. He, eventually, returned to Sony Music in 2004, on which he released his final studio album, Patience. Additionally, in 2011, Michael's music catalogue under Virgin and DreamWorks was reissued under Sony.
