= Mother's Pride (song) =

Song by George Michael

from the album Listen Without Prejudice Vol. 1
- A-side: "Waiting For That Day"
- Written: April 1990
- Released: 3 September 1990
- Length: 3:59
- Label: Epic; Columbia
- Songwriter: George Michael
- Producer: George Michael

Listen Without Prejudice Vol. 1 track listing
- 10 tracks: 1. "Praying for Time"; 2. "Freedom! '90"; 3. "They Won't Go When I Go"; 4. "Something to Save"; 5. "Cowboys and Angels"; 6. "Waiting for That Day"; 7. "Mother's Pride"; 8. "Heal the Pain"; 9. "Soul Free"; 10. "Waiting" (Reprise)

Licensed audio
- "Mother's Pride" on YouTube

"Mother's Pride" (spelled without an apostrophe on the CD caddy) is a song written and performed by George Michael from the album Listen Without Prejudice Vol. 1, released in 1990. It was released as the US B-side to the single "Waiting for That Day".

The track gained significant airplay in the United States during the first Gulf War in 1991, where radio stations often mixed in caller tributes to soldiers with the music. It peaked at number 46 on the Billboard Hot 100 chart in March 1991.

== Personnel ==
Personnel taken from Listen Without Prejudice Vol. 1 liner notes.

- George Michael – vocals, acoustic guitar
- Chris Cameron – keyboards

== Charts ==
Chart (1991)	Peak position
US Billboard Hot 100	46
