= Fantasy (George Michael song) =

Single by George Michael featuring Nile Rodgers

from the album Listen Without Prejudice / MTV Unplugged
- Released: 7 September 2017
- Recorded: 1990–2017
- Genre: Dance-pop
- Length: 4:02; 3:37 (radio edit); 5:00 (original version); 4:30 (‘98)
- Label: Sony
- Songwriter: George Michael
- Producer: George Michael

George Michael singles chronology
"Feeling Good" (2014)	"Fantasy" (2017)	"This Is How (We Want You to Get High)" (2019)

Nile Rodgers singles chronology
"My Fire" (2017)	"Fantasy" (2017)

Music video
- "Fantasy" on YouTube

"Fantasy" is a song by English singer-songwriter George Michael. It was first released in 1990 as the B-side of his single "Waiting for That Day" (and "Freedom! '90" in the rest of the world). On 7 September 2017, a new version reworked by Nile Rodgers was released as a single from Listen Without Prejudice / MTV Unplugged (2017). The single was released posthumously, more than eight months after Michael's death on 25 December 2016.

== Background ==
"Fantasy", written and produced by Michael, was recorded while he was working on Listen Without Prejudice Vol. 1. However, the track was not included on the album. Instead in October 1990, it was featured on the "Waiting for That Day" single in the United Kingdom and on the "Freedom! '90" single in the rest of the world. In 1998, a remixed version of "Fantasy" was featured on the "Outside" single. The original version of the song was included later on Michael's albums: Ladies & Gentlemen: The Best of George Michael (1998), Twenty Five (2006) and Faith (2011 edition). On 7 September 2017, a new version reworked by Nile Rodgers was released as a single from Listen Without Prejudice / MTV Unplugged (2017). The album includes the original version of "Fantasy" and the 1998 version; the Nile Rodgers remix was not included on the disc but was made available to purchasers as a digital download. On 18 October 2017, a music video was released on Vevo.

== Track listing ==
- Digital single
1. "Fantasy" (featuring Nile Rodgers) – 4:02
- Promotional single
1. "Fantasy" (featuring Nile Rodgers) (radio edit) – 3:37

== Versions ==
1. "Fantasy" – 5:00
2. "Fantasy '98" – 4:30
3. "Fantasy" (featuring Nile Rodgers) – 4:02
4. "Fantasy" (featuring Nile Rodgers) (radio edit) – 3:37

== Charts ==
Chart performance for "Fantasy"
Chart (2017)	Peak position
Belgium (Ultratip Bubbling Under Flanders)	10
Belgium (Ultratip Bubbling Under Wallonia)	26
UK Singles (Official Charts)	85

== Release history ==
Country	Date	Format	Label	Ref.
Various	7 September 2017	Digital download; streaming	Sony	
