= Listen Without Prejudice Vol. 1 =

1990 album by George Michael

Studio album by George Michael
- Released: 3 September 1990
- Recorded: July 1989 – July 1990
- Studios: Sarm West (London); Metropolis (London)
- Genres: Pop; R&B; rock
- Length: 48:13
- Labels: Epic; Columbia
- Producer: George Michael

George Michael chronology
Faith (1987)	Listen Without Prejudice Vol. 1 (1990)	Five Live (1993)

Alternative cover
- Listen Without Prejudice / MTV Unplugged cover
Symphonica (2014)	Listen Without Prejudice / MTV Unplugged (2017)	George Michael: The Faith Tour (2026)

Singles from Listen Without Prejudice Vol. 1
- 1. "Praying for Time" Released: 13 August 1990; 2. "Waiting for That Day" Released: 22 October 1990 (UK); 3. "Freedom! '90" Released: October 1990 (US); 4. "Heal the Pain" Released: 4 February 1991; 5. "Cowboys and Angels" Released: 18 March 1991; 6. "Soul Free" Released: April 1991 (US)

Listen Without Prejudice Vol. 1 is the second solo studio album by the English singer-songwriter George Michael, released on 3 September 1990 by Epic Records in the UK and on 11 September by Columbia Records in the US. The album was Michael's final album of all-new material on Columbia until 2004's Patience. Listen Without Prejudice was a stark departure from Michael's previous album, 1987's Faith, with largely acoustic instrumentation and a sombre intensity in many of the lyrics and melodies. While the album topped the UK Albums Chart, disappointing sales in the United States led to Michael's legal battle against Sony Music, in which he accused the corporation of not fully supporting him as an artist.

Listen Without Prejudice was reissued across a number of formats on 20 October 2017 and again topped the UK Albums Chart, 27 years after it first reached number one on the chart.

== Production ==
After the massive success of George Michael's 1987 album Faith, expectations for his follow-up album were also high. Michael wanted to be taken more seriously as a songwriter, which resulted in a more thoughtful, often moody recording. Like Faith, each track was produced and arranged by Michael himself.

The recording sessions commenced in July 1989 at producer Chris Porter's house, near Guildford, before being moved to Metropolis Studios in Chiswick, London. According to Tony Parsons, Listen Without Prejudice was originally conceived as a double album, with "around sixteen strong originals" written by Michael. By late September 1989, these plans were scrapped in favor of two separate albums, both scheduled for release in 1990.

== Release ==
Listen Without Prejudice Vol. 1 was released in September 1990. The album sold approximately eight million copies worldwide. The album entered the Billboard 200 at number 22 and peaked at number two. The album spent the rest of 1990 in the top ten, with a total of 42 weeks on the entire chart.

In the United Kingdom, the album was a huge success, eclipsing sales of Faith. Listen Without Prejudice debuted on the UK Albums Chart at number one. It stayed at number two for the following two weeks. It spent 34 consecutive weeks in the top 20, and jumped from number 13 to number three in its 24th week. It spent a total of 88 weeks on the chart, and was certified quadruple platinum by the British Phonographic Industry on 2 January 1992.

The follow-up album Listen Without Prejudice Vol. 2 (ostensibly scheduled to follow in June 1991) was scrapped for reasons known only to Michael and his record company. Three of the tracks intended for that album appear on the 1992 charity compilation Red Hot + Dance, while a fourth ("Crazy Man Dance") turned up on the B-side of that compilation's first single, "Too Funky".

=== Singles ===
The first single from Listen Without Prejudice Vol. 1, "Praying for Time", was released in August 1990, reaching number six on the UK Singles Chart and number one on the US Billboard Hot 100—Michael's final US number one as a solo artist.

The second single (third in the US), "Waiting for That Day", was issued over a month after the album's release. Owing to a borrowed lyric from the Rolling Stones' hit "You Can't Always Get What You Want", co-writer credits were given to Mick Jagger and Keith Richards. It reached number 23 in the UK, and, after being released there in spring 1991, number 27 in the US.

In the US, "Mother's Pride", the "Waiting for That Day" B-side, reached number 46; given its subject matter, it received considerable airplay on American radio during the Gulf War.

The album's third single (second in the US), "Freedom! '90", became one of Michael's signature songs. It was a great success in the US, where it reached number eight and earned a gold certification from the Recording Industry Association of America. It charted lower in Michael's homeland, where it peaked at number 28.

The fourth single, "Heal the Pain", peaked at number 31 in the UK in February 1991.

The fifth single from Listen Without Prejudice, "Cowboys and Angels", entered the UK Singles Chart in March and peaked at number 45.

"Soul Free" was commercially released as the sixth and final single in North America, Japan, and Australia, where it charted at number 95.

Michael refused to appear in the music videos for the album's singles. Accordingly, the video for "Praying for Time" consisted of the song's lyrics projected onto a dark background, while the video for "Freedom! '90", directed by David Fincher, featured several supermodels lip syncing its lyrics, and the destruction by fire and explosion of several icons from Michael's recent Faith period.

=== Reissue ===
Listen Without Prejudice Vol. 1 was reissued on 20 October 2017 as Listen Without Prejudice / MTV Unplugged. The reissue was first announced in September 2016. The 2CD version includes the original remastered album on the first disc, and Michael's MTV Unplugged concert, recorded at 3 Mills Studios, London on 11 October 1996, on the second disc. MTV Unplugged contains performances of "I Can't Make You Love Me" and "The Strangest Thing" that are identical to those previously released as B-sides to the single "Older", and the 2017 version of "Fantasy", reworked by Nile Rodgers and released as a single in September 2017.

The 3CD+DVD deluxe edition includes two more discs: a CD with B-sides, remixes and rarities, and a DVD with a documentary and music videos. Rarities on the third disc include: "If You Were My Woman" (recorded live at the Nelson Mandela 70th Birthday Tribute concert in 1988 and featured on the "Praying for Time" single), "Crazy Man Dance", and "Do You Really Want to Know" and "Happy" (from Red Hot + Dance). The original remastered album was also reissued on vinyl. Listen Without Prejudice / MTV Unplugged entered the UK Albums Chart at number one with first-week sales of 56,088 copies, 27 years after the original album first topped the chart.

== Critical reception ==
Professional ratings
Review scores
Source	Rating
AllMusic	4/5 stars
Chicago Tribune	3.5/4 stars
Entertainment Weekly	B−
Los Angeles Times	3/5 stars
NME	6/10
Pitchfork	8.8/10
Q	5/5 stars
Rolling Stone	3.5/5 stars
Slant Magazine	4.5/5 stars
The Village Voice	C+

Listen Without Prejudice Vol. 1 received positive reviews from music critics upon release. In a rave review for Q, Mat Snow commented that the album "should prove" Michael's talent "to any lingering doubters". Writing for the Chicago Tribune, Greg Kot found that Michael "makes a convincing case that he's more than just another pretty voice, another disposable pinup", particularly complimenting the album's sparse sound, which he welcomed as a contrast to the more dance-leaning music dominating pop radio. James Hunter of Rolling Stone said that Listen Without Prejudice generally "succeeds in its effort to establish Michael's seriousness and deliver him from caricature." Los Angeles Times critic Chris Willman wrote that, "some self-seriousness aside", the album "is an impressive piece of work in which Michael's rich feel for melodies and instinctively perfect production skills have finally met up with songs that have the ring of personal, not commercial, passion." Stuart Maconie opined in NME that it lacks "enough irresponsibility or hooks", but conceded that "it's hard to begrudge George his coming of age."

Entertainment Weekly's Greg Sandow was less enthusiastic, finding Listen Without Prejudice less "vital" and "fun" than Faith, "and, for all its noble sentiment, entirely unchallenging". In The Village Voice, Robert Christgau dismissed it as "cocktail music" and was unmoved by Michael's reflections on fame, saying that they merely indicate that "he doesn't know as much about stardom as he thinks".

Listen Without Prejudice won the award for Best British Album at the 1991 Brit Awards.

== Legacy ==
Listen Without Prejudice Vol. 1 was included in the book 1001 Albums You Must Hear Before You Die. The album was also included in Apple Music's 100 Best Albums list at number 91. In 2003, Slant Magazine's Sal Cinquemani called the album "a starkly personal statement that effectively set the artist's professional downfall into motion", suggesting that its "overall heaviness" failed to resonate with listeners expecting uptempo material in the vein of Michael's past work; he concluded that "the fact that there was never a Vol. 2, which was rumored to be the feel-good dance record said fans were probably waiting for, makes this one seem all the more sacred." The publication also included the record on its 2003 list of 50 Essential Pop Albums. AllMusic reviewer Stephen Thomas Erlewine found the album flawed, noting that Michael downplays his gift for "effortless hooks and melodies" and that his "socially conscious lyrics tend to be heavy-handed", but concluded that its best songs "make a case for his talents as a pop craftsman."

Reviewing the album's 2017 reissue, Pitchfork writer Alfred Soto situated Listen Without Prejudice in the context of the then-burgeoning HIV/AIDS pandemic: "[George Michael] understood black music as the product of a familiarity with death leavened by the banalities of earth: love, sex, comfort. Something was happening that autumn to gay artists closeted from their fans. In October [1990], Neil Tennant and Chris Lowe released Behaviour, the quietest album of the Pet Shop Boys' career. The unceasing piling up of bodies killed by HIV had made, for the moment, the bacchanal into a gauche if not repulsive gesture of sentimentality." According to Soto: "For those of us too young for the plague years—who can imagine, at least, a life lived instead of convulsing in agony on a hospital bed—chastising Michael for leaning on elegies and ballads in 1990 strikes me as glib. In its original form, Listen Without Prejudice Vol. 1 was the follow-up that Faith demanded; in this new incarnation, it's a miscellany unruffled by notions of coherence, an attempt to make art out of George Michael's quarrels with himself."

== Track listing ==
=== Original release ===
All tracks are written by George Michael, except where noted.

Listen Without Prejudice Vol. 1 – Standard edition
No.	Title	Writer(s)	Length
1.	"Praying for Time"		4:41
2.	"Freedom! '90"		6:30
3.	"They Won't Go When I Go"	Stevie Wonder; Yvonne Wright	5:06
4.	"Something to Save"		3:18
5.	"Cowboys and Angels"		7:15
6.	"Waiting for That Day"	Michael; Jagger–Richards	4:49
7.	"Mother's Pride"		3:59
8.	"Heal the Pain"		4:41
9.	"Soul Free"		5:29
10.	"Waiting" (Reprise)		2:25
Total length:			48:13

=== Listen Without Prejudice / MTV Unplugged ===
Listen Without Prejudice / MTV Unplugged – Standard edition – Disc 2: MTV Unplugged
No.	Title	Writer(s)	Length
1.	"Freedom! '90" (live)		6:02
2.	"Fastlove" (live)		5:12
3.	"I Can't Make You Love Me" (live)		5:55
4.	"Father Figure" (live)		6:19
5.	"You Have Been Loved" (live)		5:55
6.	"Everything She Wants" (live)		5:13
7.	"The Strangest Thing" (live)		6:00
8.	"Older" (live)		5:47
9.	"Star People" (live)		6:15
10.	"Praying for Time" (live)		5:29
11.	"Don't Let the Sun Go Down on Me" (with Elton John) (Japanese bonus track)	John; Bernie Taupin	5:47
12.	"Fantasy" (featuring Nile Rodgers)		4:02

Listen Without Prejudice / MTV Unplugged – Deluxe edition – Disc 3: B-sides, remixes and rarities
No.	Title	Writer(s)	Length
1.	"Soul Free" (Special Radio Edit)		4:25
2.	"Freedom! '90" (Back to Reality Mix)		6:16
3.	"Freedom! '90" (Back to Reality Mix Edit)		4:07
4.	"Fantasy"		5:02
5.	"Freedom! '90" (Edit)		5:21
6.	"Cowboys and Angels" (Edit)		4:36
7.	"If You Were My Woman" (live at Wembley Stadium, 11 Jun '88)	Gloria Jones; Clay McMurray; Pam Sawyer	4:06
8.	"Too Funky" (Single Edit)		3:50
9.	"Crazy Man Dance"		6:00
10.	"Do You Really Want to Know"		4:49
11.	"Happy"		4:09
12.	"Too Funky" (Extended)		5:39
13.	"Too Jazzy" (Happy Mix)		5:55
14.	"Fantasy '98"		4:32
15.	"Heal the Pain" (with Paul McCartney)		4:45
16.	"Desafinado" (with Astrud Gilberto)	Antônio Carlos Jobim; Newton Mendonça	3:21

Listen Without Prejudice / MTV Unplugged – Deluxe edition – Disc 4: DVD
No.	Title	Length
1.	"The Southbank Show 1990" (documentary)
2.	"Freedom! '90" (music video)
3.	"Praying for Time" (music video)
4.	"Freedom! '90" (MTV 10th Anniversary performance)

Notes:

- The track "Waiting for That Day" includes a sample of James Brown's "Funky Drummer" drum break, which was also used in "Freedom! '90". Heretofore regarded as a hip-hop technique, this was deemed unorthodox for a pop song. The song's final line comes from the Rolling Stones' classic "You Can't Always Get What You Want".
- The album cover image is a cropped section of the 1940 photograph Crowd at Coney Island by Weegee.

== Personnel ==
- George Michael – vocals, keyboards (1, 6, 9), acoustic guitar (4, 7, 8), keyboard bass (2, 5), bass guitar (4, 9), programming, percussion (2, 5), backing vocals, horn arrangements, production
- Chris Porter – mix engineer
- Danny Cummings – drums (5), percussion (2, 8, 9)
- Tony Patler – keyboards (9, 10)
- Ian Thomas – drums, percussion
- Deon Estus – bass guitar (1, 5, 6, 8), backing vocals (6)
- Phil Palmer – acoustic guitar, electric guitar
- Chris Cameron – keyboards (2, 3, 7), piano (2, 5), horn arrangements, string arrangements (5)
- Emily Burridge – cello
- Andy Hamilton – saxophone (5)
- Alfia Nakipbekova – cello
- Pete Gleadall – sequencer, programming
- Shirley Lewis – backing vocals (2)
- Bradford Branson – inner photography

== Charts ==
=== Weekly charts ===
Chart (1990–1991)	Peak position
Australian Albums (ARIA)	2
Austrian Albums (Ö3 Austria)	5
Canada Top Albums/CDs (RPM)	6
Canadian Albums (The Record)	5
Dutch Albums (Album Top 100)	2
European Albums (Top 100)	2
Finnish Albums (Suomen virallinen lista)	11
French Albums (SNEP)	2
German Albums (Offizielle Top 100)	7
Hungarian Albums (MAHASZ)	23
Italian Albums (Musica e dischi)	6
Irish Albums (IRMA)	2
Japanese Albums (Oricon)	3
New Zealand Albums (RMNZ)	2
Norwegian Albums (VG-lista)	4
Spanish Albums (PROMUSICAE)	2
Swedish Albums (Sverigetopplistan)	3
Swiss Albums (Schweizer Hitparade)	3
UK Albums (Official Charts)	1
US Billboard 200	2
US Top R&B/Hip-Hop Albums (Billboard)	61
US Cashbox Top 200 Albums	1

Chart (2017)	Peak position
Australian Albums (ARIA)	5
Austrian Albums (Ö3 Austria)	13
Belgian Albums (Ultratop Flanders)	4
Belgian Albums (Ultratop Wallonia)	14
Canadian Albums (Billboard)	34
Czech Albums (ČNS IFPI)	16
Danish Albums (Hitlisten)	7
Dutch Albums (Album Top 100)	6
French Albums (SNEP)	12
German Albums (Offizielle Top 100)	9
Greek Albums (IFPI)	5
Hungarian Albums (MAHASZ)	21
Irish Albums (IRMA)	3
Italian Albums (FIMI)	6
Japanese Albums (Oricon)	35
New Zealand Albums (RMNZ)	5
Polish Albums (ZPAV)	8
Portuguese Albums (AFP)	3
Scottish Albums (Official Charts)	1
Spanish Albums (Promusicae)	8
Swiss Albums (Schweizer Hitparade)	12
UK Albums (Official Charts)	1
US Billboard 200	41
US Top R&B/Hip-Hop Albums (Billboard)	22

=== Year-end charts ===
Chart (1990)	Position
Canada Top Albums/CDs (RPM)	31
Dutch Albums (MegaCharts)	30
French Albums (SNEP)	20
German Albums (Offizielle Top 100)	99
Japanese Albums (Oricon)	82
New Zealand (RMNZ)	39
Norwegian Autumn Period Albums (VG-lista)	14
Spanish Albums (PROMUSICAE)	17
Swiss Albums (Schweizer Hitparade)	35
UK Albums (OCC)	10
US Billboard 200	100

Chart (1991)	Position
Australian Albums (ARIA)	31
Canada Top Albums/CDs (RPM)	56
Dutch Albums (MegaCharts)	34
UK Albums (OCC)	30
US Billboard 200	44

Chart (2017)	Position
Belgian Albums (Ultratop Flanders)	77
Belgian Albums (Ultratop Wallonia)	155
UK Albums (OCC)	17

=== Decade-end charts ===
Chart (1990–1999)	Position
UK Albums (OCC)	61

== Certifications and sales ==
Region	Certification	Certified units/sales
Australia (ARIA)	2× Platinum	140,000^{^}
Austria (IFPI Austria)	Gold	25,000^{*}
Brazil (Pro-Música Brasil)	Gold	100,000^{*}
Canada (Music Canada)	2× Platinum	200,000^{^}
Denmark (IFPI Danmark)	Gold	10,000^{‡}
France (SNEP)	Platinum	300,000^{*}
Germany (BVMI)	Gold	250,000^{^}
Japan (RIAJ)	Platinum	200,000^{^}
Netherlands (NVPI)	Platinum	100,000^{^}
New Zealand (RMNZ)	Platinum	15,000^{^}
Spain (Promusicae)	Platinum	100,000^{^}
Sweden (GLF)	Platinum	100,000^{^}
Switzerland (IFPI Switzerland)	Platinum	50,000^{^}
United Kingdom (BPI)	4× Platinum	1,435,539
United States (RIAA)	2× Platinum	2,000,000^{^}
Summaries
Worldwide	—	8,000,000
^{*} Sales figures based on certification alone.^{^} Shipments figures based on certification alone.^{‡} Sales+streaming figures based on certification alone.

== Release history ==
Region	Date	Label	Format	Edition	Catalog	Ref.
United Kingdom	3 September 1990	Epic	CD; LP; cassette	Original	467295	
United States	11 September 1990	Columbia	CD; LP; cassette	Original	46898	
Japan	18 October 2017	Epic Japan	2Blu-spec CD	Listen Without Prejudice / MTV Unplugged	SICP-31004-05	
Japan	18 October 2017	Epic Japan	3Blu-spec CD+DVD	Listen Without Prejudice / MTV Unplugged (Deluxe)	SICP-31000-03	
United Kingdom	20 October 2017	Sony	LP	Original remastered	888751452718	
United Kingdom	20 October 2017	Sony	2CD; digital	Listen Without Prejudice / MTV Unplugged	888751580527	
United Kingdom	20 October 2017	Sony	3CD+DVD; digital	Listen Without Prejudice / MTV Unplugged (Deluxe)	888751580428	

== See also ==
- Panayiotou v Sony Music Entertainment (UK) Ltd.
