= Waiting for That Day =

Single by George Michael

from the album Listen Without Prejudice Vol. 1
- B-side: "Fantasy"; "Mother's Pride" (US only)
- Written: March 1990
- Released: 22 October 1990
- Genre: Pop
- Length: 4:49
- Label: Epic; Columbia
- Songwriters: George Michael; Jagger–Richards
- Producer: George Michael

George Michael singles chronology
"Praying for Time" (1990)	"Waiting for That Day" (1990)	"Freedom! '90" (1990)

Licensed audio
- "Waiting for That Day" on YouTube

"Waiting for That Day" is a song by English singer-songwriter George Michael. It was released on 22 October 1990 in the United Kingdom via Epic Records as the second overall single from his second solo studio album, Listen Without Prejudice Vol. 1 (1990).

Although it elicited positive critical reception, "Waiting for That Day" was less successful than Michael's previous singles. In his home country of the United Kingdom, it was his first single to miss the Top 20 on the UK Singles Chart; it reached number 23. The track also became his first single to miss the Top 10 on the US Billboard Hot 100; it reached number 27 on 2 March 1991.

== Background ==
Although Michael wrote "Waiting for That Day" alone, its chords and rhythm are very similar to the chords and rhythm of the Rolling Stones' "You Can't Always Get What You Want". The lyrics "you can't always get what you want" are included at the very end of "Waiting for That Day". A co-writer credit for the song was given to Mick Jagger and Keith Richards of the Rolling Stones. "Waiting for That Day" also contains samples from the song "Funky Drummer" by James Brown.

== Critical reception ==
Stephen Thomas Erlewine from AllMusic retrospectively named the song a "highlight" from Listen Without Prejudice Vol. 1. Andrew Mueller from Melody Maker felt it finds "the great chap in devastatingly ineffectual form." Nick Robinson from Music Week wrote, "Possibly one of the singles of the year, this sad plea to a lost love coasts along on a 'Funky Drummer' beat and mellow organ backing and ends perfectly with a 'You Can't Always Get What You Want' chant. Not only is it a beautiful pop song but it also sees the talented song-writer adding a touch of creativity to a standard dance beat."

== Chart performance ==
"Waiting for That Day" hit number 23 on the UK Singles Chart. It became Michael's first single to miss the top twenty in his home country. As of October 2017, the single sold 61,000 copies in the country. The track also had similar success in the United States, on the Billboard Hot 100 and on the Cash Box Top 100 peaking at 27 and 21 respectively. The track had its best success in Canada, where it was the only country it hit the top ten in. It peaked at number nine on the RPM Top Singles on 16 March 1991.

The track's B-side, "Mother's Pride", enjoyed significant airplay during the Gulf War, as it was used as a tribute to soldiers fighting in the war. It peaked at number 46 on the US Billboard Hot 100, due to airplay.

== Track listing ==
On US and Australian releases, "Waiting for That Day" is re-titled as "Waiting for That Day / You Can't Always Get What You Want".

- UK 7-inch, 12-inch, and cassette single
1. "Waiting for That Day" – 4:49
2. "Fantasy" – 5:00
- UK CD single
1. "Waiting for That Day" – 4:49
2. "Fantasy" – 5:00
3. "Father Figure" – 5:36
4. "Kissing a Fool" – 4:34
- Australian, European, and US 7-inch and cassette single, Japanese and European mini-CD single
1. "Waiting for That Day" – 4:48
2. "Mother's Pride" – 3:59
- European maxi-CD single
1. "Waiting for That Day" – 4:49
2. "Mothers Pride" – 3:59
3. "Father Figure" – 5:36
4. "Kissing a Fool" – 4:34
- Australian CD single
1. "Waiting for That Day / You Can't Always Get What You Want" – 4:48
2. "Mothers Pride" – 3:59
3. "Kissing a Fool" – 4:34

== Personnel ==
Taken from the Listen Without Prejudice Vol. 1 booklet.

- George Michael – lead and backing vocals, keyboards
- Deon Estus – bass, backing vocals
- Phil Palmer – guitars

== Charts ==
=== Weekly charts ===
Chart (1990–1991)	Peak position
Australia (ARIA)	50
Canada Top Singles (RPM)	9
Europe (Eurochart Hot 100)	64
Ireland (IRMA)	11
Netherlands (Single Top 100)	79
UK Singles (Official Charts)	23
UK Airplay (Music Week)	9
US Billboard Hot 100	27
US Adult Contemporary (Billboard)	22
US Top 40 Radio Monitor (Billboard)	40
US Cash Box Top 100	21
US Adult Contemporary (Gavin Report) "Waiting for That Day/Mother's Pride"	9
US Top 40 (Gavin Report) "Waiting for That Day/Mother's Pride"	8
US Adult Contemporary (Radio & Records)	20
US Contemporary Hit Radio (Radio & Records)	20

=== Year-end charts ===
Chart (1991)	Position
Canada Top Singles (RPM)	71
US Adult Contemporary (Gavin Report) "Waiting for That Day/Mother's Pride"	85
