= Freedom! '90 =

1990 single by George Michael

Single by George Michael

from the album Listen Without Prejudice Vol. 1
- B-side: "Fantasy"; "Freedom! '90" (Back to Reality mix); "Mother's Pride"
- Written: June 1989
- Released: October 1990
- Genre: Pop; house; gospel; Madchester; breakbeat; dance-pop
- Length: 6:30 (album/video/single edit); 4:31 (UK radio edit); 5:21 (radio edit)
- Label: Epic; Columbia
- Songwriter: George Michael
- Producer: George Michael

George Michael singles chronology
"Waiting for That Day" (1990)	"Freedom! '90" (1990)	"Heal the Pain" (1991)

Music video
- "Freedom! '90" on YouTube

"Freedom! '90" (also known simply as "Freedom!") is a song written, produced, and performed by English singer-songwriter George Michael, and released in October 1990. The "'90" added to the end of the title is to prevent confusion with a hit by Michael's former band Wham!, also entitled "Freedom". The song's backing beat is a sample from James Brown's song "Funky Drummer".

It was the third single taken from Listen Without Prejudice Vol. 1 (1990), though released as the second single from the album in the US and Australia. "Freedom! '90" was one of a few uptempo songs on this album. The song refers to Michael's past success with Wham!, yet also shows a new side of himself as a new man, who is more cynical about the music business than ever before.

Michael refused to appear in the music video for the song, directed by David Fincher, and cast a group of supermodels to appear instead. It went into heavy rotation on MTV and was remastered for the 2017 documentary, George Michael: Freedom. On 30 October 2020, it premiered on YouTube in 4K for its 30th anniversary. Michael performed this song, alongside his 2012 single "White Light", during the closing ceremony of the 2012 London Olympics. Rolling Stone placed "Freedom! '90" at number 126 in their list of "500 Best Songs of All Time" in 2021. Billboard ranked it number 39 in their "500 Best Pop Songs of All Time" in 2023.

== Analysis ==
Alan Jones from Music Week wrote, "Despite its title, the song is not a direct descendant of Wham!'s 1984 chart-topper 'Freedom', owing more to Soul II Soul's 'Back to Life'."

Ethan Hein, adjunct professor of music at New York University said that "Freedom! '90" has "an exceedingly peculiar structure for a mainstream pop song" in which a basic four-bar instrumental intro is followed by the chorus harmony and an instrumental break, with the first chorus finally appearing almost two minutes in: "an eternity—most pop songs are practically over at that point". Other features include a five-layer drum pattern with a Funky Drummer break, and a C Mixolydian harmony intro and chorus with Afro-Cuban syncopation and hemiola.

== Critical reception ==
Stephen Thomas Erlewine from AllMusic named the song a "highlight" from Listen Without Prejudice Vol. 1. Larry Flick from Billboard magazine wrote, "Platinum pop star waxes both cynical and philosophical on this well-worded stab at his early days of fame. Slowly ingratiating, midtempo R&B/hip-hop base could also reaffirm his presence at club level." In a 2008 review, The Daily Vault's Melanie Love stated, "Its catchy chorus and uptempo, jangling instrumentation, coupled with his signature soaring vocals make this confessional a striking example of Michael's newfound independence and proves that his struggle for seriousness could retain the hooks and brilliant tones that make his music so endearing." Adam Sweeting from The Guardian named it one of the "best tracks" of the album, adding, "'Freedom! '90' is a boppy slice of pop which nods in the direction of house and of Happy Mondays' much more scintillating 'Step On'. Its bright, clanging piano provides the aural focus." Chris Roberts from Melody Maker declared it as "a bleeding-heart apology for his reckless sexy past."

Music & Media magazine remarked that a "stirring Bo Diddley beat, a gospel approach and a great piano riff are the main features of this addictive hit candidate." Victoria Segal from NME noted the "hate-fuelled 'Sympathy for the Devil' roll" of the song. A reviewer from People commented, 'On "Freedom 90'—at least this one's set to a radio-ready groove—he rails against the image he has spent the last four years cultivating: "I was every little hungry schoolgirl's pride and joy/And I guess it was enough for me/To win the race? A prettier face!/Brand new clothes and a big fat place/On your rock and roll TV/But today the way I play the game is not the same/No way"."

== Chart performance ==
"Freedom! '90" is 6:30 long, but a shorter version was made available for radio consumption. It was the second US single from the album Listen Without Prejudice Vol. 1, and had contrasting fortunes each side of the Atlantic—it peaked at number 28 on the UK Singles Chart, but was a major success on both the US Billboard Hot 100 and US Cash Box Top 100, reaching number 8 and 7 respectively, selling over 500,000 copies to earn a Gold certification from the RIAA. In Canada, Michael achieved another chart-topper. As of October 2017, the single sold 83,000 copies in UK.

== Music video ==
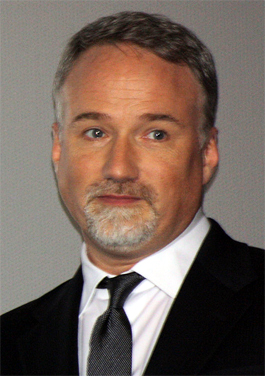
David Fincher directed the music video for "Freedom! '90".

By 1990, Michael had become weary of the pressures of fame, telling the Los Angeles Times, "At some point in your career, the situation between yourself and the camera reverses. For a certain number of years, you court it and you need it, but ultimately, it needs you more and it's a bit like a relationship. The minute that happens, it turns you off ... and it does feel like it is taking something from you." Accordingly, he decided not to appear in photo shoots and music videos, saying, "I would like to never step in front of a camera again."

Although he later relented and decided to film a video for his new song, he still refused to appear in it. Instead, inspired by Peter Lindbergh's now-iconic portrait of Naomi Campbell, Linda Evangelista, Tatjana Patitz, Christy Turlington, and Cindy Crawford for the January 1990 cover of the British edition of Vogue, Michael asked the five models to appear in the video. While models appearing in music videos was then commonplace, they usually played the singer's love interest, as with Christie Brinkley's appearance in Billy Joel's "Uptown Girl" video, or Turlington's appearance in Duran Duran's "Notorious" video. For "Freedom! '90", the five models, rather than portraying his on-screen girlfriends, would lip sync the song in Michael's place. The video also included male models John Pearson, Peter Formby, Rafael Edholm, and fashion photographer Mario Sorrenti.

Evangelista took some persuading before agreeing to appear in the video, saying, "He thought it would make us into a big deal, that it would be good for us. I was like, 'Please, we're here. We've already arrived!'" After speaking with Michael, she was convinced, and rearranged her schedule. In a 2015 Vanity Fair article, Evangelista reflected on her decision positively, saying, "Little did I know that to this day, when someone meets me for the first time, they bring up that video. That's what they remember. So yeah, George was right." An initial disagreement over their salaries was resolved when Annie Veltri, who represented Crawford, Evangelista, Campbell, and Patitz at Elite Model Management, clarified that all of her clients would be compensated equally, at $15,000 a day.

The video was directed by David Fincher, who had also directed videos by Madonna, Billy Idol, Aerosmith, and Paula Abdul (who choreographed George Michael's Faith Tour). His team for the multi-day "Freedom! '90" shoot included Camilla Nickerson, who later became a Vogue contributing editor, as the clothes stylist, hair stylist Guido and makeup artist Carol Brown. Cinematographer Mike Southon shot the video in a vast building in the London Borough of Merton that Nickerson says exhibited "a grandeur and a Blade Runner feel". Despite not appearing in the video, Michael was on set.

The 92-sketch storyboard called for each model to film on separate days, except for Evangelista and Turlington, who appear in a scene together. Each model was assigned a verse to lip-synch, while for the song's chorus, Fincher envisioned the three iconic items from Michael's 1987 music video "Faith" that had come to symbolize his public image at the time: his leather jacket, a Wurlitzer jukebox, and guitar, exploding in a ball of flame, except the leather jacket, at each occurrence of the word "freedom" during the chorus. Before the chorus, the leather jacket was simply ignited and burned. Whereas "Faith" had opened with a jukebox phonograph needle touching a vinyl record, "Freedom! '90" opens with a compact disc player's laser beam reading a CD, after Evangelista turns on the CD player. In a 2004 interview with Adam Mattera for Attitude magazine, Michael reflected on the significance of the video's symbolism: "By the end of the Faith tour I was so miserable because I absolutely knew that I was gay... I didn't suddenly want to come out. I wanted to do it with some kind of dignity. So I thought 'okay, you have to start deconstructing this whole image.'"

Nickerson envisioned a "low-key street style" for the wardrobe, which she characterizes as "a sort of undone beauty", contrasting the prevailing "vampy, larger-than-life" direction in which the fashion industry, typified by models doing film work, was moving at the time. The black sweater worn by Evangelista was from Nickerson's own closet, and the studded biker boots worn by Campbell belonged to Nickerson's boyfriend. Most of the wardrobe budget, however, went to the 60-foot-long linen sheet used by Turlington, the nature of which was specified by Fincher. Guido looked to each model's personality to devise hairdos that would accentuate their "true beauty". Evangelista was up until 3:00am the night before the shoot dyeing her hair platinum blonde, which reflected the cool-blue lights of the set, while Campbell's hair was curled and pulled up with a headband for a 1960s "tough chic" in order to highlight her movement for a shot in which she dances solo. Patitz's hair was framed with soft curls and Turlington's was gelled back to exploit her statuesque form as her character crosses the screen trailing the linen sheet. Brown also tried to highlight each model's personality with makeup, saying, "Cindy was the sexy one; Christy was the cool, classic one; and Linda was the chameleon. She could do anything." Following Fincher's instruction that Crawford's makeup look "completely trashed, as if she'd been in a steamy atmosphere," Brown did Crawford's makeup, and then oiled it down by covering her with glycerin. Crawford spent most of her time topless and sitting in an empty bathtub, resting on an apple box so that enough of her would be visible.

The video premiered a few weeks after the shoot, and was heavily aired on MTV. Reflecting on the video in 2015, Crawford stated that, at the time, they thought they were simply making "a really cool video," but that in retrospect, the video exhibits a dark humour: as MTV had altered the music industry so that physical beauty was now necessary to sell music, the video used five beautiful faces instead of the song's vocalist to mock this.

== Impact and legacy ==
Slant Magazine listed "Freedom! '90" at number 30 in their ranking of "The 100 Best Singles of the 1990s" in 2011. Polish Porcys included it in their "100 Singli 1990–1999" in 2012. It was covered by Anna Kendrick as part of the soundtrack to the movie Pitch Perfect 3 in 2017. Time Out ranked it number two in their list of "The 50 Best Gay Songs to Celebrate Pride All Year Long" in 2022. In the same year, it was named the 16th-best song of the 1990s by Pitchfork. In 2023, Billboard magazine ranked "Freedom! '90" number 39 in their list of "500 Best Pop Songs of All Time", while Rolling Stone ranked it number nine in their "The 50 Most Inspirational LGBTQ Songs of All Time". In 2024, Esquire ranked it number 20 in their list of "The 50 Best Songs of the '90s". In 2025, Billboard ranked it number 28 in their "The 100 Greatest LGBTQ+ Anthems of All Time" list.

== Track listings ==
All tracks are written by George Michael, except where noted.

7-inch: Epic / GEO 3 (UK)
No.	Title	Writer(s)	Length
1.	"Freedom! '90" (LP version)		6:30
2.	"Freedom! '90" (Back to Reality mix)	Michael; Beresford Romeo; Caron Wheeler; Nellee Hooper; Simon Law	6:12

12-inch: Epic / GEO T3 (UK)
No.	Title	Writer(s)	Length
1.	"Freedom! '90" (Back to Reality mix)	Michael; Romeo; Wheeler; Hooper; Law	6:12
2.	"Freedom! '90" (LP version)		6:30
3.	"Mother's Pride"		3:59

CD maxi: Columbia / 44K 73584 (US)
No.	Title	Writer(s)	Length
1.	"Freedom! '90" (Back to Reality mix)	Michael; Romeo; Wheeler; Hooper; Law	6:14
2.	"Fantasy"		5:01
3.	"Freedom! '90" (album version)		6:24

== Personnel ==
Personnel taken from Listen Without Prejudice Vol. 1 liner notes.

- George Michael – lead & backing vocals, bass, percussion
- Chris Cameron – piano, keyboards
- Danny Cummings – percussion
- Shirley Lewis – backing vocals
- Phil Palmer – acoustic & electric guitars

== Charts ==
=== Weekly charts ===
Chart (1990–2016)	Peak position
Australia (ARIA)	18
Austria (Ö3 Austria Top 40)	25
Belgium (Ultratop 50 Flanders)	26
Canada Top Singles (RPM)	1
Canada Adult Contemporary (RPM)	15
Europe (Eurochart Hot 100)	39
Europe (European Hit Radio)	1
Finland (Suomen virallinen lista)	22
France (SNEP)	23
Germany (GfK)	41
Greece (IFPI)	10
Hungary (Single Top 40)	34
Ireland (IRMA)	17
Israel (Israeli Singles Chart)	2
Luxembourg (Radio Luxembourg)	20
Netherlands (Dutch Top 40)	8
Netherlands (Single Top 100)	15
New Zealand (Recorded Music NZ)	13
Portugal (AFP)	9
Sweden (Sverigetopplistan)	20
UK Singles (Official Charts)	28
UK Airplay (Music Week)	1
US Billboard Hot 100	8
US Adult Contemporary (Billboard)	27
US Dance Club Songs (Billboard)	16
US Dance Singles Sales (Billboard)	18
US Cash Box Top 100	7
Zimbabwe (ZIMA)	1

=== Year-end charts ===
Chart (1990)	Position
Canada Top Singles (RPM)	96
Netherlands (Single Top 100)	95

Chart (1991)	Position
Australia (ARIA)	59
Canada Top Singles (RPM)	53
Europe (European Hit Radio)	33
US Billboard Hot 100	95

== Certifications ==
Region	Certification	Certified units/sales
Australia (ARIA)	Platinum	70,000^{‡}
Denmark (IFPI Danmark)	Gold	45,000^{‡}
New Zealand (RMNZ)	Platinum	30,000^{‡}
United Kingdom (BPI)	Platinum	715,909
United States (RIAA)	Gold	500,000^{^}
^{^} Shipments figures based on certification alone.^{‡} Sales+streaming figures based on certification alone.

== Release history ==
Region	Date	Format(s)	Label(s)	Ref.
United States	October 1990	—N/a	Columbia	
Australia	12 November 1990	7-inch vinyl; 12-inch vinyl; CD; cassette	Epic	
Japan	15 November 1990	Mini-CD	Epic	
United Kingdom	3 December 1990	7-inch vinyl; 12-inch vinyl; CD	Epic	

== Robbie Williams version ==
"Freedom"

Single by Robbie Williams
- Released: 29 July 1996
- Length: 4:23 (single version)
- Label: Chrysalis
- Songwriter: George Michael
- Producer: Stephen Hague

Robbie Williams singles chronology
"Freedom" (1996)	"Old Before I Die" (1997)

Music video
- "Freedom" on YouTube

English singer-songwriter Robbie Williams covered "Freedom" and released it as his debut solo single in July 1996 by Chrysalis, a year after his departure from Take That. In 2010, it appeared on Williams' greatest hits album In and Out of Consciousness: Greatest Hits 1990–2010.

=== Critical reception ===
Caroline Sullivan from The Guardian rated Williams' version of the song three out of five. A reviewer from Music Week gave it four out of five, adding, "A pretty good return from Williams. His fans should forgive the, at times, dodgy vocals and send him towards the top of the chart with this George Michael cover."

=== Music video ===
The accompanying music video shows Williams dancing in the sea and in a field, celebrating his separation from his former group. In a 2010 interview with Magic 105.4, Williams told Neil Fox that the song had not even been recorded by the scheduled date of filming, which required him to mime to Michael's version of the song.

=== Track listings ===
- UK CD1
1. "Freedom"
2. "Freedom" (Arthur Baker mix)
3. "Freedom" (instrumental)
4. "Interview" (part one)
- UK CD2
1. "Freedom" (radio edit)
2. "Freedom" (The Next Big Genn mix)
3. "Freedom" (Arthur Baker's Shake and Bake mix)
4. "Interview" (part two)
- UK cassette single
1. "Freedom" (full length version)
2. "Freedom" (The Next Big Genn mix)
3. "Freedom" (Arthur Baker's Shake and Bake mix)
- European CD single
1. "Freedom" (radio edit)
2. "Freedom" (The Next Big Genn mix)

=== Charts ===
==== Weekly charts ====
Chart (1996)	Peak position
Australia (ARIA)	6
Austria (Ö3 Austria Top 40)	19
Belgium (Ultratop 50 Flanders)	16
Belgium (Ultratop 50 Wallonia)	16
Denmark (IFPI)	9
Estonia (Eesti Top 20)	8
Europe (Eurochart Hot 100)	5
Europe (European AC Radio)	12
Europe (European Hit Radio)	7
Europe (Channel Crossovers)	6
Finland (Suomen virallinen lista)	7
France Airplay (SNEP)	40
Germany (GfK)	10
Greece (IFPI Greece)	2
Hungary (Mahasz)	9
Iceland (Íslenski Listinn Topp 40)	18
Ireland (IRMA)	6
Israel (Israeli Singles Chart)	4
Italy (Musica e dischi)	12
Netherlands (Dutch Top 40)	10
Netherlands (Single Top 100)	12
New Zealand (Recorded Music NZ)	39
Scottish Singles Sales (Official Charts)	1
Spain (AFYVE)	1
Spain Airplay (Top 40 Radio)	24
Sweden (Sverigetopplistan)	24
Switzerland (Schweizer Hitparade)	8
UK Singles (Official Charts)	2
UK Airplay (Music Week)	9

==== Year-end charts ====
Chart (1996)	Position
UK Singles (OCC)	46

=== Certifications ===
Region	Certification	Certified units/sales
United Kingdom (BPI)	Silver	200,000^{^}
^{^} Shipments figures based on certification alone.
