= George Michael =

English singer-songwriter (1963–2016)

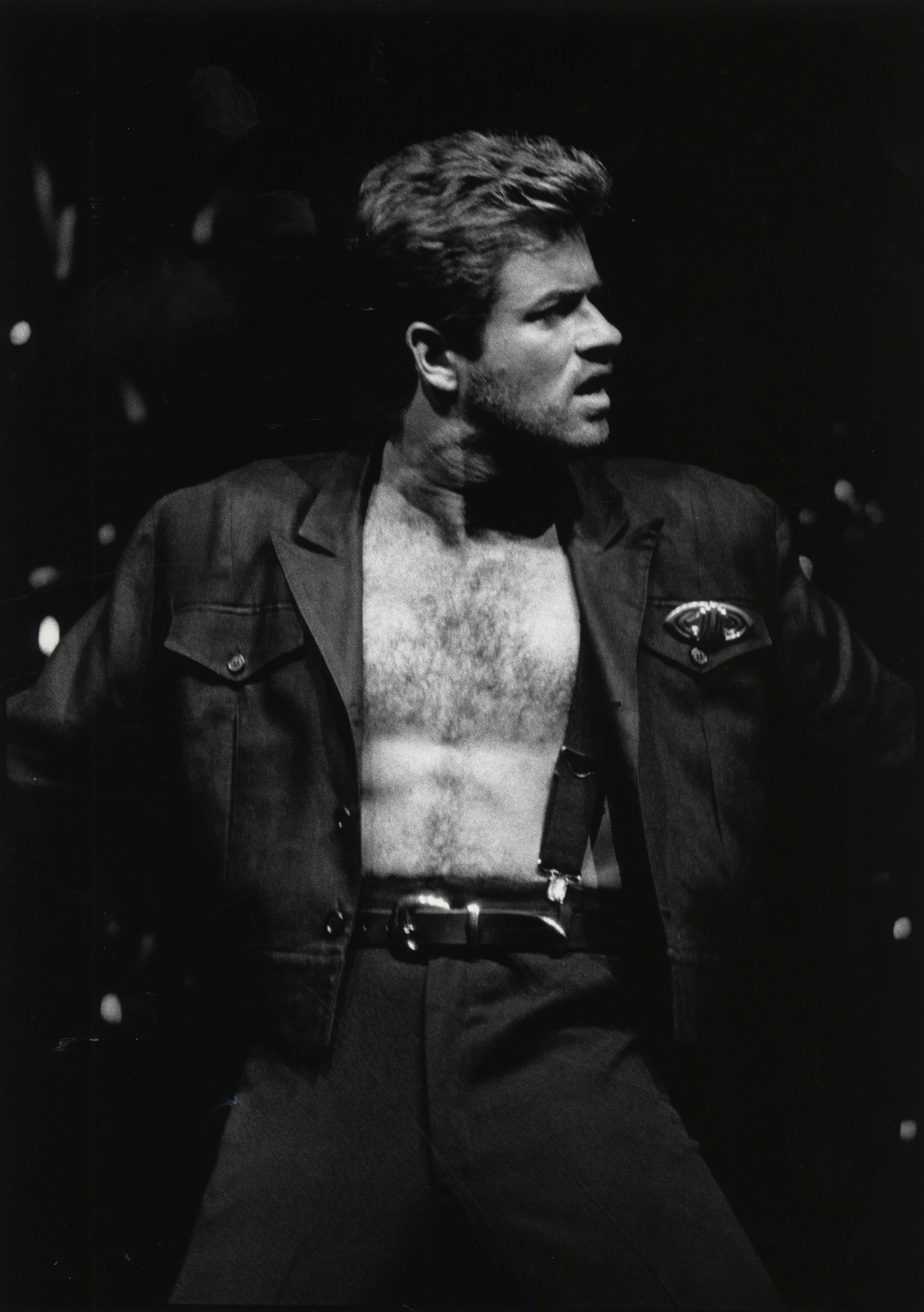
- Michael in 1988
- Born: Georgios Kyriacos Panayiotou; 25 June 1963; East Finchley, Middlesex, England
- Died: 25 December 2016 (aged 53); Goring-on-Thames, South Oxfordshire, England
- Burial place: Highgate Cemetery West, London
- Occupations: Singer; songwriter; record producer
- Years active: 1981–2016
- Partners: Anselmo Feleppa (1991–1993); Kenny Goss (1996–2009); Fadi Fawaz (2012–2016)
- Musical career
- Genres: Pop; dance-pop; post-disco; R&B
- Instruments: Vocals; keyboards
- Works: Discography; songs
- Labels: Innervision; Columbia; Epic; Virgin; DreamWorks; Polydor; Sony; Aegean
- Formerly of: Wham!; Boogie Box High
- George Michael's voice from the BBC programme Desert Island Discs, 5 October 2007.
- Website: georgemichael.com

George Michael (born Georgios Kyriacos Panayiotou; 25 June 1963 – 25 December 2016) was an English singer-songwriter and record producer. Regarded as a pop culture icon, he is one of the best-selling recording artists of all time. Michael has been widely recognised as a creative force in songwriting, vocal performance, and visual presentation. He was inducted into the Rock and Roll Hall of Fame in 2023. The Radio Academy named him the most played artist on British radio during the period 1984–2004.

Born in East Finchley, Middlesex, Michael rose to fame after forming the pop duo Wham! with Andrew Ridgeley in 1981. He took part in Band Aid's UK number-one single "Do They Know It's Christmas?" in 1984 and performed at the following year's Live Aid concert. His debut studio album, Faith (1987), won the Grammy Award for Album of the Year and became one of the best-selling albums of all time, having sold over 25 million copies worldwide. Michael then went on to release a series of multimillion-selling albums, including Listen Without Prejudice Vol. 1 (1990), Older (1996), Ladies & Gentlemen: The Best of George Michael (1998), Songs from the Last Century (1999), Patience (2004), and Twenty Five (2006).

Michael came out as gay in 1998, and was an active LGBTQ rights campaigner and HIV/AIDS charity fundraiser. His personal life, drug use, and legal troubles made headlines following an arrest for public lewdness in 1998 and multiple drug-related offences. The 2004 documentary A Different Story covered his career and personal life. His 25 Live tour spanned three years from 2006 to 2008. In 2011, Michael fell into a coma after developing pneumonia, but recovered. He performed his final concert at London's Earls Court in 2012. Michael died of heart disease on Christmas Day in 2016, at his home in Goring-on-Thames, Oxfordshire.

Michael had 13 number-one songs on the UK singles chart and 10 number-one songs on the US Billboard Hot 100. His most successful singles include "Careless Whisper", "A Different Corner", "I Knew You Were Waiting (For Me)", "Faith", "Father Figure", "One More Try", "Monkey", "Praying for Time", "Freedom! '90", "Jesus to a Child", "Fastlove", "Outside", "Amazing", and "An Easier Affair". His awards include two Grammy Awards, three Brit Awards, twelve Billboard Music Awards, and four MTV Video Music Awards. He was listed among Rolling Stone's 200 Greatest Singers of All Time and Billboard's Greatest Hot 100 Artists of All Time.

== Early life, family and education ==
Georgios Kyriacos Panayiotou (Greek: Γεώργιος Κυριάκος Παναγιώτου, pronounced [ʝeˈorʝios cirˈʝakos panaˈʝiotu]) was born in East Finchley, the only son and the youngest child of three. His father, Kyriacos "Jack" Panayiotou, was a Greek Cypriot restaurateur who emigrated from Patriki, Cyprus, to England in the 1950s. His mother, Lesley Angold (born Harrison, 1937–1997), was an English dancer. In June 2008, Michael told the Los Angeles Times that his maternal grandmother was Jewish, but she had married a non-Jewish man and raised their children with no knowledge of their Jewish background due to her fear during World War II.

Michael spent most of his childhood in Kingsbury, London, in the home his parents bought soon after his birth; he attended Roe Green Junior School and Kingsbury High School. Michael had two sisters: Yioda (born 1958) and Melanie (1960–2019). On the BBC's Desert Island Discs, Michael said that his interest in music followed an injury to his head around the age of eight.

== Early music ==
While Michael was in his early teens, the family moved to Radlett. There, Michael began attending Bushey Meads School in Bushey, where he was nicknamed "Yog" and befriended his future Wham! partner Andrew Ridgeley. The two had the same ambition of being musicians. Michael busked on the London Underground, performing songs such as "'39" by Queen. His involvement in the music business began with his working as a DJ, playing at the Bel Air Restaurant in Northwood, London, clubs, and local schools around Bushey, Stanmore, and Watford. This was followed by the formation of a short-lived ska band called the Executive, with Ridgeley, Ridgeley's brother Paul, Andrew Leaver, Jamie Gould, and David Mortimer (later known as David Austin).

== Wham! ==
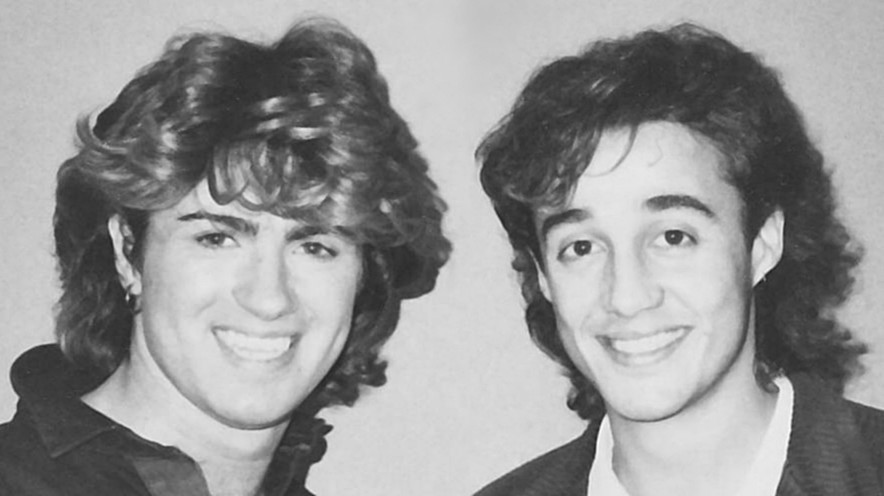
Michael (left) and Andrew Ridgeley as Wham!, c. 1984–1985

Michael formed the duo Wham! with Ridgeley in 1981. On the cusp of fame, he decided to legally change his name to the more accessible George Michael. The band's first album Fantastic reached No. 1 in the UK in 1983 and produced a series of top 10 singles including "Young Guns", "Wham Rap! (Enjoy What You Do)", and "Club Tropicana". Their second album, Make It Big, reached No. 1 on the charts in the US. Singles from that album included "Wake Me Up Before You Go-Go" (No. 1 in the UK and US), "Freedom", "Everything She Wants". "Careless Whisper", which was issued as the second single from the album, was credited to "Wham! featuring George Michael" in the US, and was released as a solo single by Michael in most territories. The song reached No. 1 in nearly 25 countries, including the UK and US, and was Michael's first solo effort as a single. In December 1984, the single "Last Christmas" was released. In 1985, Michael received the first of his three Ivor Novello Awards for Songwriter of the Year from the British Academy of Songwriters, Composers and Authors.

Michael performed on the original 1984 Band Aid recording of "Do They Know It's Christmas?", singing his lines third, after Paul Young and Boy George. The song became the UK Christmas number one, and Michael also donated the profits from "Last Christmas" (which charted that week at number two) and "Everything She Wants" to charity. Michael sang "Don't Let the Sun Go Down on Me", a 1974 song by Elton John, with John at Live Aid at Wembley Stadium in London on 13 July 1985. He also contributed background vocals to David Cassidy's 1985 hit "The Last Kiss", as well as Elton John's 1985 successes "Nikita" and "Wrap Her Up". Michael cited Cassidy as a major career influence and interviewed Cassidy for David Litchfield's Ritz Newspaper.

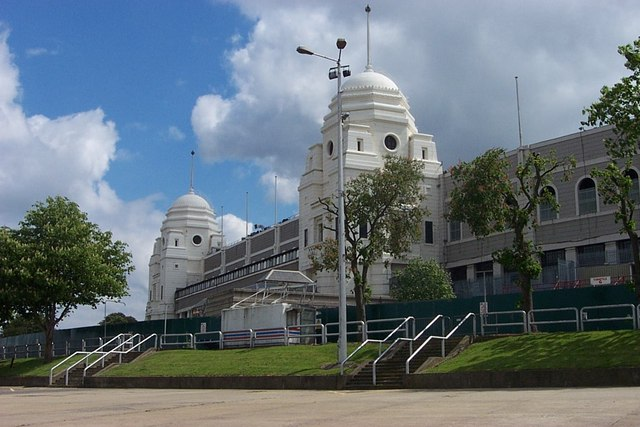
Michael performed at Live Aid at the old Wembley Stadium (exterior pictured) on 13 July 1985, and Wham! played their last concert, The Final, at the same venue on 28 June 1986.

Wham!'s tour of China in April 1985, the first visit to China by a Western popular music act, generated worldwide media coverage, much of it focused on Michael. The headline in the Chicago Tribune read: "East meets Wham!, and another great wall comes down". Before Wham!'s appearance in China, many kinds of music in the country were forbidden. The band's manager, Simon Napier-Bell, had spent 18 months trying to convince Chinese officials to let the duo play. The audience included members of the Chinese government. Chinese television presenter Kan Lijun, who was the on-stage host, spoke of Wham!'s historic performance:

No-one had ever seen anything like that before. All the young people were amazed and everybody was tapping their feet. Of course the police weren't happy and they were scared there would be riots.

Wham! performed their hits with scantily clad dancers and strobing disco lights. According to Napier-Bell, Michael tried to get the crowd to clap along to "Club Tropicana", but "they hadn't a clue – they thought he wanted applause and politely gave it", before adding that some Chinese did eventually "get the hang of clapping on the beat." A UK embassy official in China stated "there was some lively dancing but this was almost entirely confined to younger western members of the audience." The tour was documented by film director Lindsay Anderson and producer Martin Lewis in their film Wham! in China: Foreign Skies.

With the success of Michael's solo singles, "Careless Whisper" (1984) and "A Different Corner" (1986), rumours of an impending break up of Wham! intensified. The duo officially separated in 1986, after releasing a farewell single, "The Edge of Heaven" and a farewell compilation, The Final (their third album Music from the Edge of Heaven was released in North America and Japan), plus a sell-out concert at Wembley Stadium that included the world premiere of the China film. The Wham! partnership ended officially with the commercially successful single "The Edge of Heaven", which reached No. 1 on the UK chart in June 1986.

== Solo career ==
=== 1987–1989: Faith ===
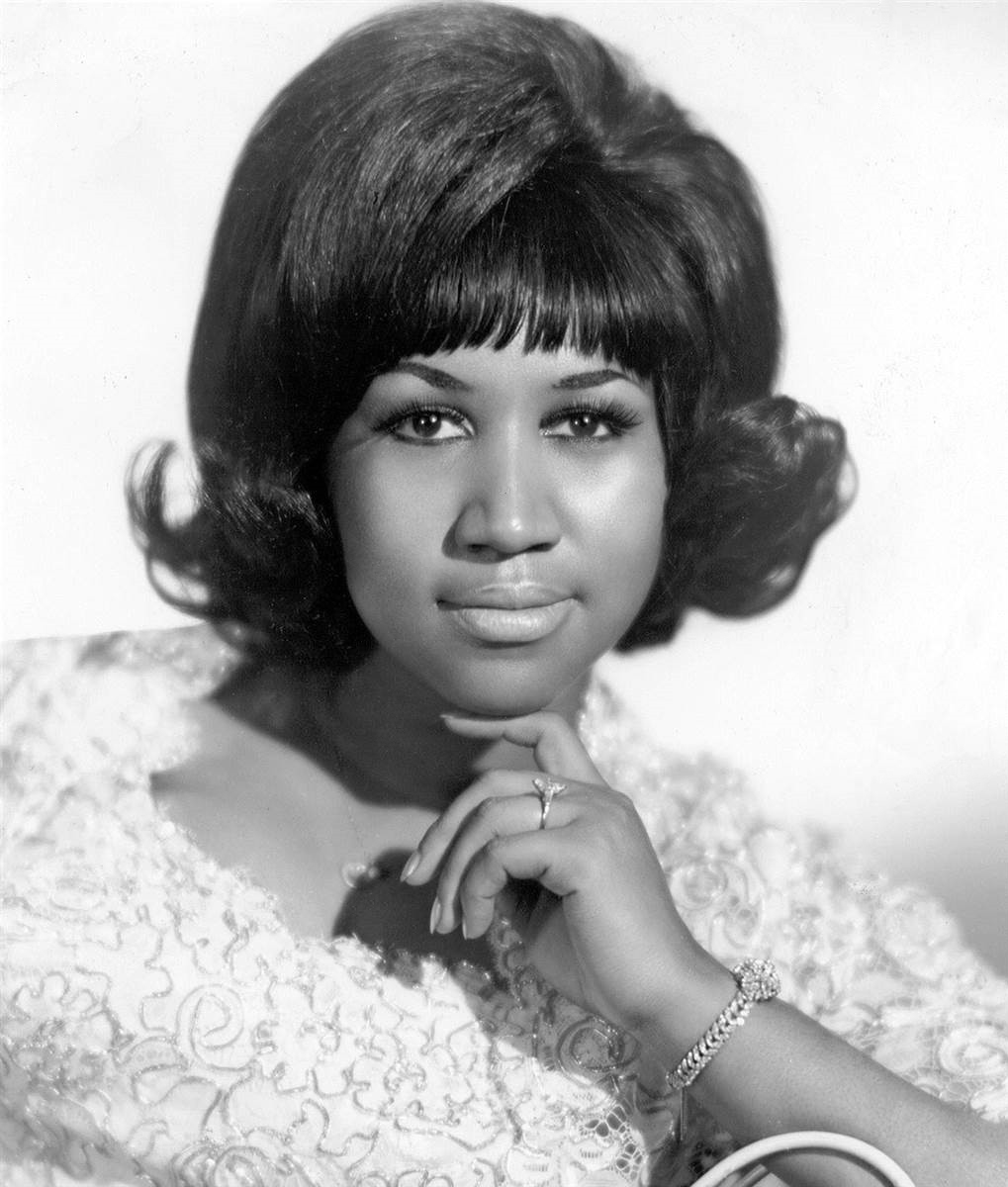
Michael duetted with Aretha Franklin (pictured in 1968) on "I Knew You Were Waiting (For Me)".

In January 1987, at the beginning of his solo career, Michael released "I Knew You Were Waiting (For Me)", a duet with Aretha Franklin. "I Knew You Were Waiting (For Me)" was a one-off project that helped Michael achieve an ambition by singing with one of his favourite artists. It scored number one on both the UK Singles Chart and the US Billboard Hot 100 upon its release. For Michael, it became his third consecutive solo number one in the UK from three releases, after 1984's "Careless Whisper" and 1986's "A Different Corner". The single was also the first Michael had recorded as a solo artist which he had not written himself. The co-writer, Simon Climie, was unknown at the time; he later had success as a performer with the band Climie Fisher in 1988. Michael and Franklin won a Grammy Award in 1988 for Best R&B Performance – Duo or Group with Vocal for the song.

In mid-1987, Michael released the single "I Want Your Sex", the first to be taken from his then-forthcoming debut studio album, Faith. The song was banned by many radio stations in the UK and US, due to its sexually suggestive lyrics. MTV broadcast the video, featuring celebrity make-up artist Kathy Jeung in a basque and suspenders, only during the late night hours. Michael argued that the act was beautiful if the sex was monogamous, and he recorded a brief prologue for the video in which he said: "This song is not about casual sex." One of the racier scenes involved Michael writing the words "explore monogamy" on his partner's back in lipstick. Some radio stations played a toned-down version of the song, "I Want Your Love", with the word "love" replacing "sex". When "I Want Your Sex" reached the US charts, American Top 40 host Casey Kasem refused to say the song's title, referring to it only as "the new single by George Michael." In the US, the song was also sometimes listed as "I Want Your Sex (from Beverly Hills Cop II)", since the song was featured on the soundtrack of the movie. Despite censorship and radio play problems, "I Want Your Sex" reached No. 2 on the US Billboard Hot 100 and No. 3 in the UK.

The second single, "Faith", was released in October 1987, a few weeks before the album. "Faith" became one of Michael's most popular songs. The song was No. 1 on the Billboard Hot 100 for four consecutive weeks, becoming the best-selling single of 1988 in the US. It also reached No. 1 in Australia, and No. 2 on the UK Singles Chart. The video provided some definitive images of the 1980s music industry in the process—Michael in shades, leather jacket, cowboy boots, and Levi's jeans, playing a guitar near a classic-design jukebox.

On 30 October, Faith was released in the UK and in several markets worldwide. Faith topped the UK Albums Chart, and in the US, the album had 51 non-consecutive weeks in the top 10 of Billboard 200, including 12 weeks at No. 1. Faith had many successes, with four singles ("Faith", "Father Figure", "One More Try", and "Monkey") reaching No. 1 in the US. Faith was certified Diamond by the RIAA for sales of 10 million copies in the US. To date, global sales of Faith are more than 25 million units. The album was highly acclaimed by music critics, with AllMusic journalist Steve Huey describing it as a "superbly crafted mainstream pop/rock masterpiece" and "one of the finest pop albums of the '80s". In a review by Rolling Stone magazine, journalist Mark Coleman commended most of the songs on the album, which he said "displays Michael's intuitive understanding of pop music and his increasingly intelligent use of his power to communicate to an ever-growing audience."

In 1988, Michael embarked on a world tour, the Faith Tour. In Auburn Hills, Michigan, Michael was joined on stage by Franklin for "I Knew You Were Waiting (For Me)". The tour was the second highest grossing event of 1988, earning $17.7 million. At the 1988 Brit Awards held at the Royal Albert Hall on 8 February, Michael received the first of his two awards for Best British Male Solo Artist. Faith won the Grammy Award for Album of the Year at the 31st Grammy Awards, held on 22 February 1989. At the 1989 MTV Video Music Awards on 6 September in Los Angeles, Michael received the Video Vanguard Award.

=== 1990–1993: Listen Without Prejudice Vol. 1, Red Hot + Dance and Five Live ===
According to Michael in his 2004 documentary A Different Story, achieving international fame did not bring him happiness, leading him to question the implications of being idolised by millions of teenage fans. The whole Faith process (promotion, videos, tour, awards) left him exhausted, lonely and frustrated, and far from his friends and family. In 1990, he told his record company Sony that, for his next album, he did not want to do promotions like the one for Faith.

Michael's second studio album, Listen Without Prejudice Vol. 1 was released in Europe on 3 September 1990 and one week later in the US. The title is an indication of his desire to be taken more seriously as a songwriter. The album reached No. 1 in the UK Albums Chart and peaked at No. 2 on the US Billboard 200. It spent a total of 88 weeks on the UK Albums Chart and was certified four-times Platinum by the BPI. The album produced five UK singles, all of which were released within an eight-month period: "Praying for Time", "Waiting for That Day", "Freedom! '90", "Heal the Pain", and "Cowboys and Angels" (the latter being his only single not to chart in the UK top 40). Michael refused to do any promotion for the album. At the 1991 Brit Awards, Listen Without Prejudice Vol. 1 won the award for Best British Album.

The album's first single, "Praying for Time", with lyrics concerning social ills and injustice, was released in August 1990. James Hunter of Rolling Stone magazine described the song as "a distraught look at the world's astounding woundedness. Michael offers the healing passage of time as the only balm for physical and emotional hunger, poverty, hypocrisy, and hatred." The song was an instant success, reaching No. 1 on the US Billboard Hot 100 and No. 6 in the UK. A video was released shortly thereafter, consisting of the lyrics on a dark background. Michael did not appear in this video or any subsequent videos for the album. The second single from Listen Without Prejudice Vol. 1, "Waiting for That Day", was an acoustic-heavy single, released as an immediate follow-up to "Praying for Time".

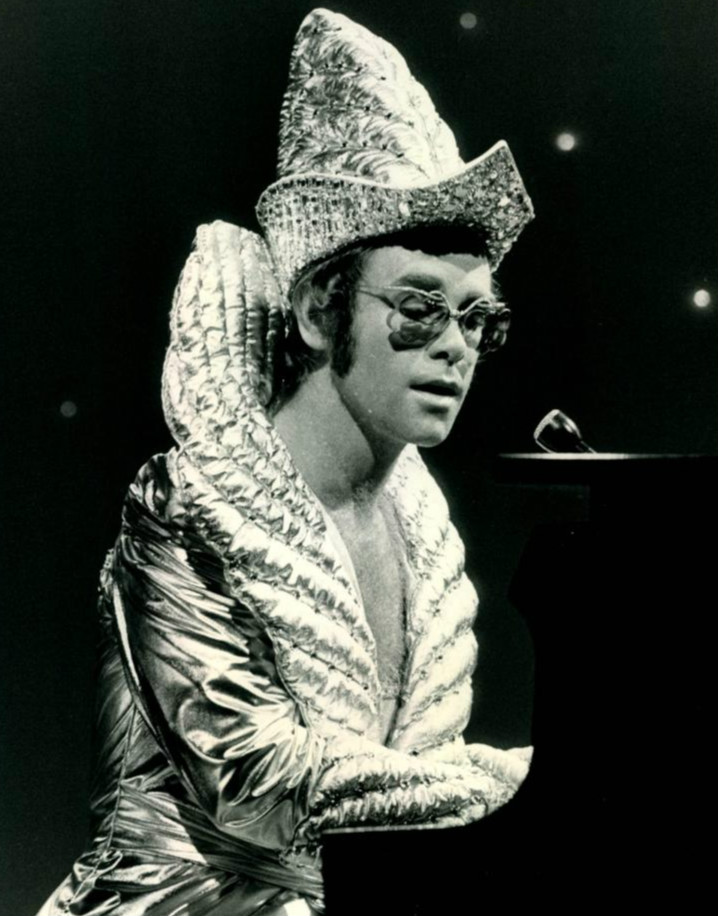
Elton John (pictured in 1975) duetted with Michael on a live remake of "Don't Let the Sun Go Down on Me".

"Freedom! '90" was the second of only two singles from Listen Without Prejudice to be supported by a music video (the other being the Michael-less "Praying for Time"). The song alludes to his struggles with his artistic identity, and prophesied his efforts shortly thereafter to end his recording contract with Sony Music. As if to prove the song's sentiment, Michael refused to appear in the video (directed by David Fincher), and instead recruited supermodels Naomi Campbell, Linda Evangelista, Christy Turlington, Tatjana Patitz, and Cindy Crawford to appear in and lip sync in his stead. It also featured lyrics critical of his sex symbol status. It reached No. 8 on the Billboard Hot 100 in the US, and No. 28 on the UK Singles Chart. "Mother's Pride" gained significant radio play in the US during the first Persian Gulf War during 1991, often with radio stations mixing in callers' tributes to soldiers with the music.

In 1990, Michael released an autobiography through Penguin Books titled Bare, co-written with Tony Parsons. In 1991, Michael embarked on the Cover to Cover tour in Japan, England, the US, and Brazil, where he performed at Rock in Rio. The tour was not a proper promotion for Listen Without Prejudice Vol. 1; rather, it enabled Michael to perform his favourite cover songs. A live recording of "Don't Let the Sun Go Down on Me", performed by Michael and Elton John as a duet during Michael's concert at London's Wembley Arena on 23 March 1991, was released as a single at the end of 1991, and reached No. 1 in both the UK and US.

An expected follow-up album, Listen Without Prejudice Vol. 2, was scrapped due to Michael's lawsuit with Sony. Instead, Michael donated three songs to the charity project Red Hot + Dance, for the Red Hot Organization which raised money for AIDS awareness; a fourth track, "Crazyman Dance", was the B-side of 1992's "Too Funky". Michael donated the royalties from "Too Funky" to the same cause. "Too Funky" reached No. 4 on the UK Singles Chart and No. 10 on the US Billboard Hot 100.

Michael performed with Queen at The Freddie Mercury Tribute Concert on 20 April 1992 at Wembley Stadium. The concert was a tribute to the life of the late Queen frontman, Freddie Mercury, with the proceeds going to AIDS research. Michael performed "'39", "These Are the Days of Our Lives" with Lisa Stansfield and "Somebody to Love". Michael's performance of "Somebody to Love" was hailed as "one of the best performances of the tribute concert". Michael later reflected, "It was probably the proudest moment for me of my career, because it was me living out a childhood fantasy, I suppose, to sing one of Freddie's songs in front of 80,000 people."

"George Michael was the best. There's a certain note in his voice when he did 'Somebody to Love' that was pure Freddie."

— Queen guitarist Brian May on Michael's performance at the Freddie Mercury Tribute Concert.

The Five Live EP featured five live recordings (six in several countries) performed by Michael, Queen, and Lisa Stansfield. "Somebody to Love" and "These Are the Days of Our Lives" were recorded at the Freddie Mercury Tribute Concert. "Killer", "Papa Was a Rollin' Stone", and "Calling You" were recorded during Michael's Cover to Cover tour in 1991. All proceeds from the sale of the EP benefited the Mercury Phoenix Trust. Sales of the EP were strong through Europe, where it debuted at No. 1 in the UK and several European countries. Chart success in the US was less spectacular, where it reached No. 40 on the Billboard 200 ("Somebody to Love" reached No. 30 on the US Billboard Hot 100). The performance would later feature on Queen's compilation album Greatest Hits III.

=== 1994–1997: Older ===
During November 1994, after a long period of seclusion, Michael appeared at the first MTV Europe Music Awards show, where he gave a performance of a new song, "Jesus to a Child". The song was a melancholy tribute to his lover, Anselmo Feleppa, who had died in March 1993. The song entered the UK Singles Chart at No. 1 and No. 7 on Billboard upon release in 1996. It was Michael's longest UK Top 40 single, at almost seven minutes long. The exact identity of the song's subject—and the nature of Michael's relationship with Feleppa—was shrouded in innuendo and speculation, as Michael had not confirmed he was homosexual and did not do so until 1998. The video for "Jesus to a Child" was a picture of images recalling loss, pain and suffering. Michael consistently dedicated the song to Feleppa before performing it live.

Michael released "Fastlove", an energetic tune about wanting gratification and fulfilment without commitment, in 1996. The single version was nearly five minutes long. "Fastlove" was supported by a futuristic virtual reality-related video. The single reached No. 1 on the UK Singles Chart, spending three weeks at the top spot. In the US, "Fastlove" peaked at No. 8. Following "Fastlove", Michael released Older, his third studio album. In the UK, the album was particularly notable for producing a record six top three hit singles in a two-year span.

In 1996, Michael was voted Best British Male at the MTV Europe Music Awards and the Brit Awards; and at the British Academy's Ivor Novello Awards, he was awarded the title of Songwriter of the Year for the third time. Michael performed a concert at Three Mills Studios, London, for MTV Unplugged. It was his first long performance in years, and in the audience was Michael's mother, who died of cancer the following year.

In May 1997, the single "Waltz Away Dreaming" was released. Recorded as a duet with Irish singer-songwriter Toby Bourke, the song was a tribute to Michael's mother, and served as the first release on Michael's short-lived record label, Aegean Records.

=== 1998–1999: Ladies & Gentlemen: The Best of George Michael and Songs from the Last Century ===
In November 1998, Michael released his first solo greatest hits collection, Ladies & Gentlemen: The Best of George Michael. The collection of 28 songs (29 songs are included on the European and Australian release) was released through Sony Music Entertainment as a condition of severing contractual ties with the label. Ladies & Gentlemen was a success, peaking at No. 1 on the UK Albums Chart for eight weeks. It spent over 200 weeks in the UK chart, and is the 45th best-selling album ever in the UK. It is certified seven-times platinum in the UK and multi-platinum in the US, and is Michael's most commercially successful album in his homeland, having sold more than 2.8 million copies. As of 2013, the album had reached worldwide sales of approximately 15 million copies. The first single taken off the album, "Outside", was a humorous song making a reference to Michael's arrest for soliciting a policeman in a public toilet. "As", his duet with Mary J. Blige, was released as the second single in many territories around the world. Both singles reached the top 5 in the UK Singles Chart.

Released in 1999, Songs from the Last Century is a studio album of cover tracks. The album achieved the lowest peak of Michael's solo efforts, peaking at No. 157 on the American Billboard 200 albums chart and at No. 2 in the UK Albums Chart.

=== 2000–2004: Patience ===
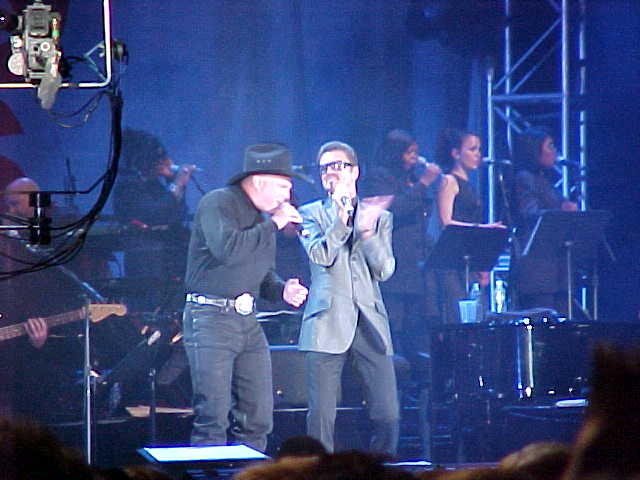
Garth Brooks and Michael (right) performing at the Robert F. Kennedy Memorial Stadium, Washington, in 2000

In 2000, Michael recorded the hit single "If I Told You That" with Whitney Houston. Michael co-produced on the single along with Rodney Jerkins. "Freeek!", Michael's first single from his fifth studio album, Patience, reached the Top 10 in the UK in 2002. His next single was "Shoot the Dog" which was released in July 2002 during the lead-up to the 2003 invasion of Iraq. The video for the song showed Tony Blair as George Bush's poodle. The single's cover featured the Daily Mirror's "Howdy Poodle" front page from earlier in the year. Responding to criticism, Michael said, "I am British, I live here, I pay my taxes, and I'm very, very worried that we are now the second most dangerous country in the world thanks to our special relationship with America." It reached No. 1 in Denmark and made the top 5 in most European charts. It peaked at No. 12 on the UK Singles Chart.

In February 2003, Michael recorded another song in protest against the looming Iraq war, Don McLean's "The Grave". The original was written by McLean in 1971 and was a protest against the Vietnam War. Michael performed the song on numerous TV shows including Top of the Pops and So Graham Norton. His performance of the song on Top of the Pops on 7 March 2003 was his first studio appearance on the programme since 1986. He ran into conflict with the show's producers for an anti-war, anti-Blair T-shirt worn by some members of his band. McLean stated that he was "proud of George Michael for standing up for life and sanity".

When Michael's fifth studio album, Patience, was released in 2004, it was critically acclaimed and went to No. 1 on the UK Albums Chart. The album became one of the fastest-selling albums in the UK, selling over 200,000 copies in the first week alone. It reached the Top 5 on most European charts and peaked at No. 12 in the US, selling over 500,000 copies to earn a Gold certification from the RIAA. "Amazing", the third single from the album, became a No. 1 hit in Europe. When Michael appeared on The Oprah Winfrey Show on 26 May 2004, to promote the album, he performed "Amazing", along with his classic songs "Father Figure" and "Faith". On the show, Michael spoke of his arrest, the public revelation of his homosexuality, and his resumption of public performances. He allowed Oprah's crew inside his home outside London. The fourth single taken off the album was "Flawless (Go to the City)". It was a dance hit in Europe as well as North America, reaching No. 1 on the Billboard Hot Dance Club Play and becoming Michael's last No. 1 single on the US Dance chart.

=== 2005–2010: Twenty Five and 25 Live ===
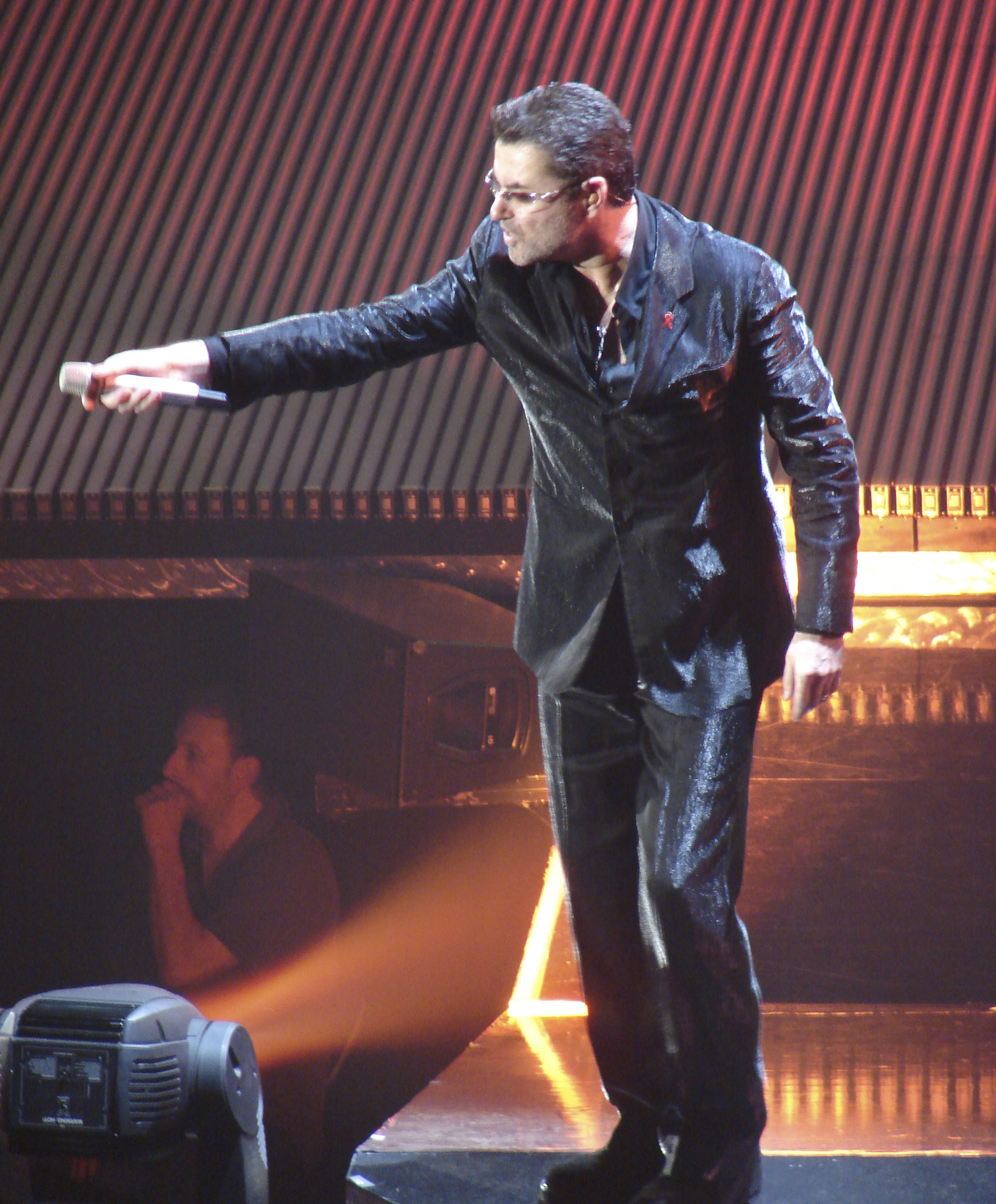
Michael performing in Antwerp, Belgium, 2006

During the 2005 Live 8 concert at Hyde Park, London, Michael joined Paul McCartney on stage, harmonising on The Beatles classic "Drive My Car". In November 2006, Michael's second greatest hits album, Twenty Five, was released by Sony BMG. The album, celebrating the 25th anniversary of his music career, debuted at No. 1 in the UK. In 2006, Michael embarked on his first tour in 15 years, 25 Live. The tour began in Barcelona, Spain, on 23 September and finished in December at Wembley Arena in England. On 9 June 2007, Michael became the first artist to perform live at the newly renovated Wembley Stadium in London. On 25 March 2008, a third part of the 25 Live tour was announced for North America, with 21 dates in the US and Canada.

Michael made his American acting debut by playing a guardian angel to Jonny Lee Miller's character on Eli Stone, a US TV series. Each episode of the show's first season was named after a song of his. Michael also appeared on the 2008 finale show of American Idol on 21 May, singing "Praying for Time". When asked what he thought Simon Cowell would say of his performance, he replied "I think he'll probably tell me I shouldn't have done a George Michael song. He's told plenty of people that in the past, so I think that'd be quite funny." On 25 December 2008, Michael released a new Christmas-themed track, "December Song (I Dreamed of Christmas)", on his website for free.

In early 2010, Michael performed his first concerts in Australia since 1988. On 20 February 2010, Michael performed his first show in Perth at the Burswood Dome to an audience of 15,000.

=== 2011–2016: Symphonica and final releases ===
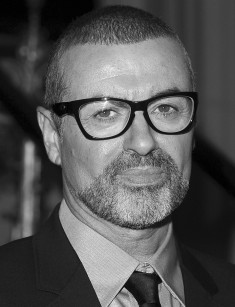
Michael at the Royal Opera House in 2011

On 2 March 2011, Michael announced the release of his cover version of New Order's 1987 hit "True Faith" in aid of the UK charity telethon Comic Relief. Michael appeared on Comic Relief itself, featuring in the first Carpool Karaoke sketch of James Corden, with the pair singing songs while Corden drove around London. On 15 April 2011, Michael released a cover of Stevie Wonder's 1972 song, "You and I", as an MP3 gift to Prince William and Catherine Middleton on the occasion of their wedding on 29 April 2011. Although the MP3 was released for free download, Michael appealed to those who downloaded the track to make a contribution to "The Prince William & Miss Catherine Middleton Charitable Gift Fund".

The Symphonica Tour began at the Prague State Opera House on 22 August 2011. In October 2011, Michael was announced as one of the final nominees for the Songwriter's Hall of Fame. In November, he had to cancel the remainder of the tour as he became ill with pneumonia in Vienna, Austria, ultimately slipping into a coma.

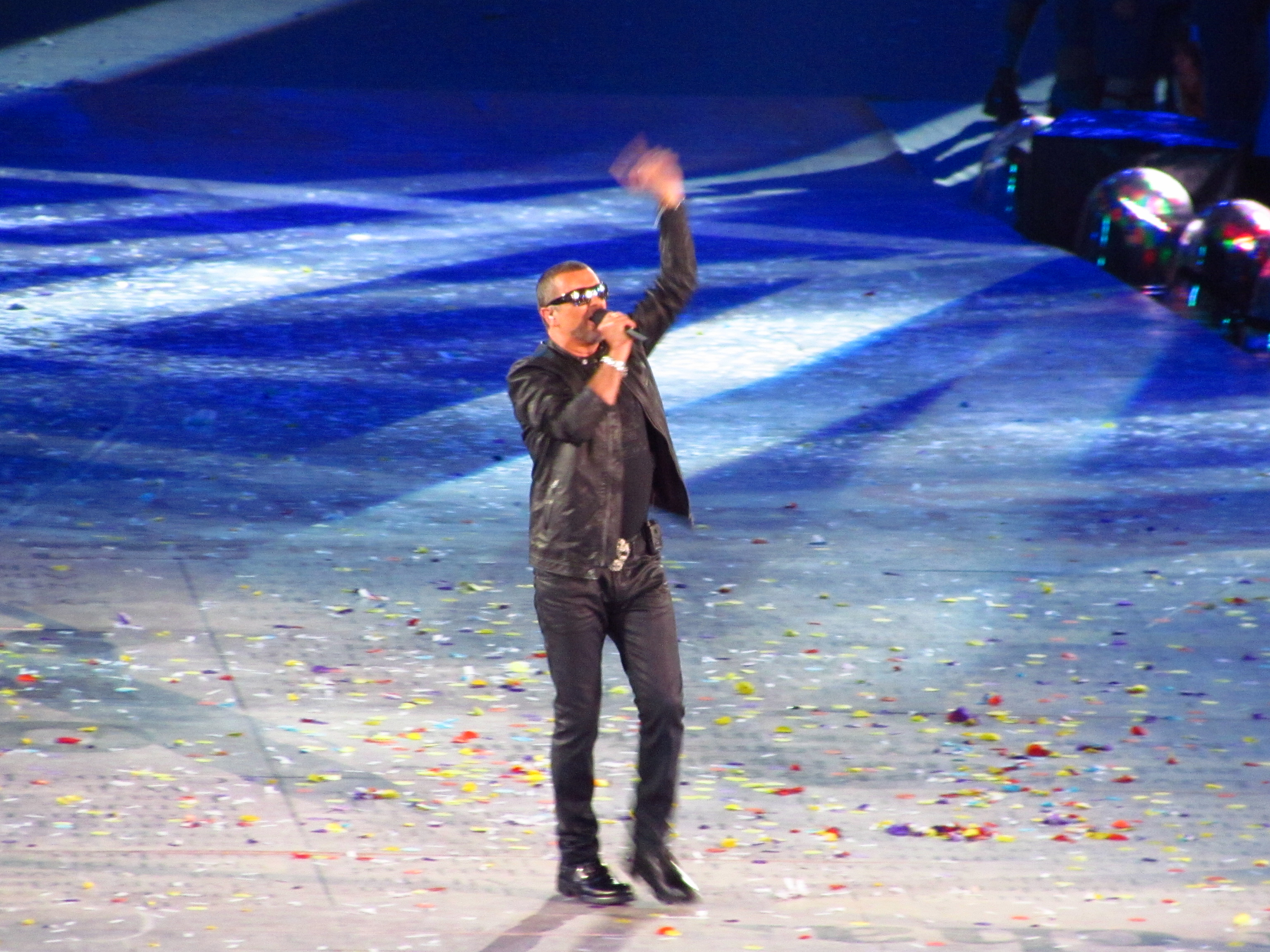
Michael performing at the closing ceremony of the 2012 London Summer Olympics

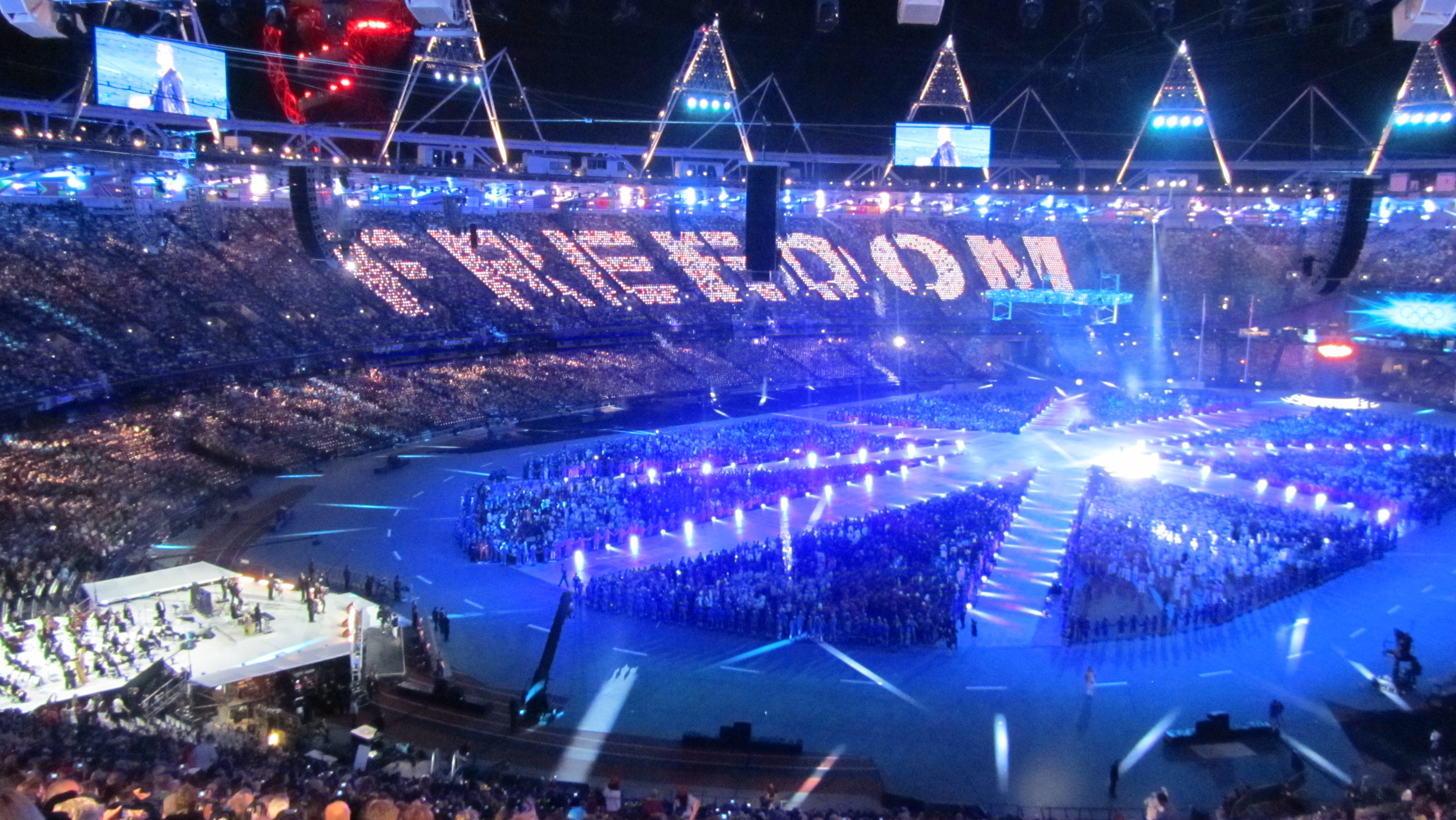
LED lights during Michael's performance of his 1990 single "Freedom!" at the ceremony

In February 2012, two months after leaving hospital, Michael made a surprise appearance at the 2012 Brit Awards at the O_{2} Arena in London, where he received a standing ovation, and presented Adele the award for Best British Album. In March, Michael announced that he was healthy and that the Symphonica Tour would resume in autumn. The final concert of the tour—which was also the final concert of Michael's life–was performed at London's Earls Court on 17 October 2012.

Symphonica was released on 17 March 2014, and became Michael's seventh solo No. 1 album in the UK, and ninth overall including his Wham! chart-toppers. The album was produced by Phil Ramone and Michael; the album was Ramone's last production credit. On 2 November 2016, Michael's management team announced that a second documentary on his life, entitled Freedom, was set to be released in March 2017. A month later, English songwriter Naughty Boy confirmed plans to collaborate with Michael, for a new song and album. Naughty Boy claimed that the song is "amazing but [...] bittersweet".

== Posthumous releases ==
On 7 September 2017, the single "Fantasy", featuring Nile Rodgers, was released. Written and produced by Michael, the song was recorded while he was working on Listen Without Prejudice Vol. 1 but the track was not included on the album. Instead, in October 1990, it was featured on the "Waiting for That Day" single in the United Kingdom and on the "Freedom! '90" single in the rest of the world. On 7 September 2017, a new version reworked by Nile Rodgers was released as a single from Listen Without Prejudice / MTV Unplugged (2017). The album includes the original version of "Fantasy" and the 1998 version; the Nile Rodgers remix was not included on the disc but was made available to purchasers as a digital download. On 18 October 2017, a music video was released on Vevo.

In 2019, the Emma Thompson-written film Last Christmas was released. The title of the film is taken from the Wham! classic. An official soundtrack album was released by Legacy Recordings on CD, two-disc vinyl, and digital formats on 8 November 2019. The album contains 14 Wham! and solo George Michael songs, as well as a previously unreleased song titled "This Is How (We Want You to Get High)". The soundtrack album debuted at number one on the UK Official Soundtrack Albums Chart and at number 11 on the UK Albums Chart on 15 November 2019. It also entered the Australian Albums Chart at number seven, the Irish Albums Chart, where it debuted at number 32, climbing to number 26 the following week, and at number 55 on the US Billboard 200.

Having charted at number two upon its release in 1984 (behind Band Aid's "Do They Know It's Christmas?" which Michael also performed in), "Last Christmas" finally reached number-one in the UK Singles Chart on New Year's Day 2021 (chart week ending date 7 January 2021), more than 36 years after its initial release. Andrew Ridgeley said the chart placing was "a testament to its timeless appeal and charm", adding: "It is a fitting tribute to George's song-writing genius... he would have been immensely proud and utterly thrilled." The period of 36 years taken to reach number one was a UK chart record, which would be surpassed by Kate Bush with "Running Up That Hill" in June 2022 which took 37 years. "Last Christmas" would become the UK Christmas number one for the first time in 2023, and it hit number one again at Christmas in 2024, making it the first song to top the Christmas chart in consecutive years, and become only the third song to top the festive chart more than once after Queen's "Bohemian Rhapsody" and "Do They Know It's Christmas?".

On 22 June 2022, the documentary film Freedom Uncut was released. Michael had been working on the film shortly before his death, alongside David Austin, and provides the narration throughout. NME, The Guardian and Empire all praised the film and rated it 4/5 stars. On 30 September 2022, a remastered and expanded version of Older was released comprising the original Older album, the Upper disc and three bonus CDs, containing remixes and live recordings of Older-era tracks. The album charted at number 2 on the UK Official Albums Chart Top 100 on 7 October 2022.

On 10 March 2026, it was announced by George Michael Entertainment that a concert film George Michael: The Faith Tour documenting Michael's 1988 Faith Tour concerts at the Palais Omnisports de Paris-Bercy in Paris would be theatrically released worldwide and in the U.K. in November 2026. The film is accompanied by a live release entitled The Faith Tour, which features eighteen previously unreleased live tracks.

== Personal life ==
=== Sexuality and relationships ===
Michael stated that his early fantasies were about women, which "led me to believe I was on the path to heterosexuality", but at puberty he started to fantasise about men, which he later said "had something to do with my environment". At the age of 19, Michael told Andrew Ridgeley that he was bisexual. Michael also told one of his two sisters, but he was advised not to tell his parents about his sexuality. In 1998, not long after he was outed for his sexuality, Michael said on Parkinson that he became confident he was gay when he fell in love with a man. This stance was reiterated in a 1999 interview with The Advocate, where Michael told the editor-in-chief, Judy Wieder, that it was "falling in love with a man that ended his conflict over bisexuality". "I never had a moral problem with being gay", Michael told her. "I thought I had fallen in love with a woman a couple of times. Then I fell in love with a man, and realised that none of those things had been love."

In 2004, Michael said, "I used to sleep with women quite a lot in the Wham! days but never felt it could develop into a relationship because I knew that, emotionally, I was a gay man. I didn't want to commit to them, but I was attracted to them. Then I became ashamed that I might be using them. I decided I had to stop, which I did when I began to worry about AIDS, which was becoming prevalent in Britain. Although I had always had safe sex, I didn't want to sleep with a woman without telling her I was bisexual. I felt that would be irresponsible. Basically, I didn't want to have that uncomfortable conversation that might ruin the moment, so I stopped sleeping with them." He added: "If I wasn't with Kenny [his boyfriend at the time], I would have sex with women, no question". He said he believed that the formation of his sexuality was "a nurture thing, via the absence of my father who was always busy working. It meant I was exceptionally close to my mother", though he stated that "there are definitely those who have a predisposition to being gay in which the environment is irrelevant." In 2007, Michael said he had hidden his sexuality because of worries over what effect it might have on his mother. Two years later, he added: "My depression at the end of Wham! was because I was beginning to realise I was gay, not bisexual."

During the late 1980s, Michael had a relationship with make-up artist Kathy Jeung, who was regarded for a time as his artistic "muse" and who appeared in the "I Want Your Sex" video. Michael later said that she had been his "only bona fide" girlfriend, and that she knew of his bisexuality. In 2016, Jeung reacted to Michael's death by calling him a "true friend" with whom she had spent "some of the best time of [her] life".

In 1991, Michael established a relationship with Anselmo Feleppa, a Brazilian dress designer whom he had met at the Rock in Rio concert in January that year. Six months into their relationship, Feleppa discovered that he was HIV-positive. Michael later said: "It was terrifying news. I thought I could have the disease too. I couldn't go through it with my family because I didn't know how to share it with them – they didn't even know I was gay." In 1993, Feleppa died of an AIDS-related brain haemorrhage. Michael's single "Jesus to a Child" is a tribute to Feleppa (Michael consistently dedicated it to him before performing it live), as is his album Older (1996). In 2008, speaking about the loss of Feleppa, Michael said: "It was a terribly depressing time. It took about three years to grieve, then after that I lost my mother. I felt almost like I was cursed."

In 1996, Michael entered into a long-term relationship with Kenny Goss, a former flight attendant, cheerleading coach, and sportswear executive from Dallas, Texas. They had a home in Dallas, a 16th-century house in Goring-on-Thames, Oxfordshire, and an £8 million mansion in Highgate, north London. In late November 2005, it was reported that Michael and Goss planned to register their relationship as a civil partnership in the UK, but because of negative publicity and his upcoming tour, they postponed their plans. On 22 August 2011, the opening night of his Symphonica Tour, Michael announced that he and Goss had split two years earlier.

Michael's homosexuality became publicly known following his April 1998 arrest for public lewdness. In 2007, Michael said "that hiding his sexuality made him feel 'fraudulent', and his eventual outing, when he was arrested [...] in 1998, was a subconsciously deliberate act." In 2012, Michael entered a relationship with Fadi Fawaz, a Lebanese-Australian celebrity hairstylist and freelance photographer based in London. It was Fawaz who found Michael's body on Christmas morning 2016.

=== Legal problems ===
On 7 April 1998, Michael was arrested for "engaging in a lewd act" in a public restroom at the Will Rogers Memorial Park in Beverly Hills, California. Michael was arrested by undercover policeman Marcelo Rodríguez in a sting operation. In an MTV interview, Michael stated: "I got followed into the restroom and then this cop—I didn't know it was a cop, obviously—he started playing this game, which I think is called, 'I'll show you mine, you show me yours, and then when you show me yours, I'm going to nick you!'"

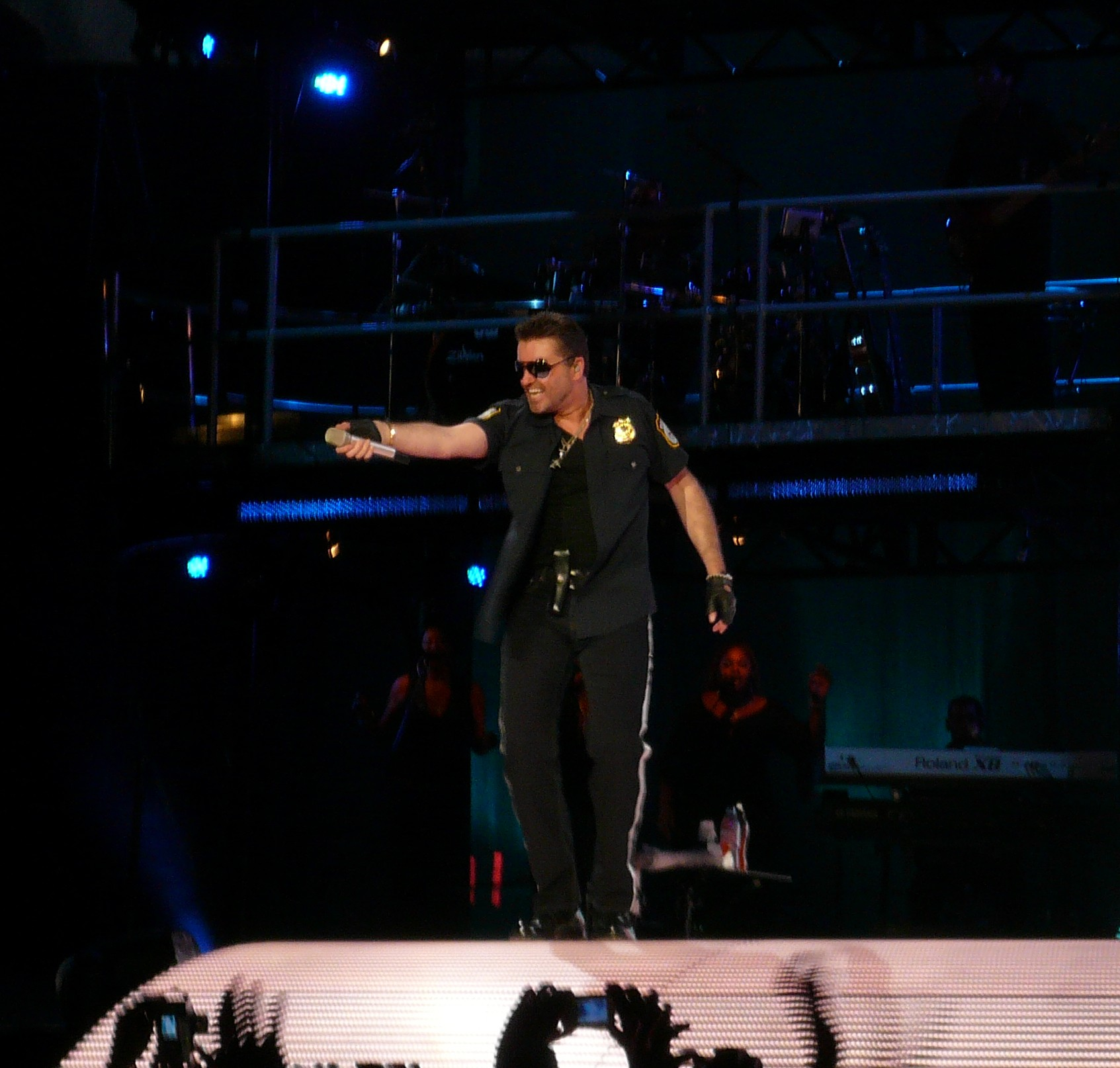
Michael performing "Outside" at the Olympic Stadium, Athens in 2007

After pleading "no contest" to the charge, Michael was fined US$810 and sentenced to 80 hours of community service. Soon afterwards, Michael made a video for his single "Outside", which satirised the public toilet incident and featured men dressed as policemen kissing. Rodríguez claimed that this video "mocked" him, and that Michael had slandered him in interviews. In 1999, he brought a US$10 million court case in California against Michael. The court dismissed the case, but an appellate court reinstated it on 3 December 2002. The court then ruled that Rodríguez, as a public official, could not legally recover damages for emotional distress.

On 23 July 2006, Michael was accused of engaging in anonymous public sex at London's Hampstead Heath. Michael said that his cruising was not a problem in his relationship with his partner Kenny Goss.

In February 2006, Michael was arrested for possession of Class C drugs, an incident that he described as "my own stupid fault, as usual". He was cautioned by the police and released. In 2007, he pleaded guilty to drug-impaired driving after obstructing the road at traffic lights in Cricklewood in northwest London, and was subsequently banned from driving for two years and sentenced to community service. On 19 September 2008, Michael was arrested in a public convenience in the Hampstead Heath area for possession of Class A and C drugs. He was taken to the police station and cautioned for controlled substance possession.

In the early hours of 4 July 2010, Michael was returning from the gay pride parade, when he was spotted on CCTV crashing his car into the front of a Snappy Snaps store in Hampstead, north London, and was arrested on suspicion of being unfit to drive. On 12 August, London's Metropolitan Police said he was "charged with possession of cannabis and with driving while unfit through drink or drugs". It was reported that Michael had also been taking the prescription tricyclic antidepressant medication amitriptyline. On 24 August, he pleaded guilty at Highbury Corner Magistrates' Court in London after admitting driving under the influence of drugs. On 14 September, at the same court, Michael was sentenced to eight weeks in prison, a fine, and a five-year ban from driving. Michael was released from Highpoint Prison in Suffolk on 11 October, after serving four weeks. In the dent in the shop wall Michael had crashed into, someone wrote the graffito "Wham!".

=== Health ===
Michael struggled with substance abuse for many years. He was arrested for drug-related offences in 2006, 2008 and 2010. In September 2007, on BBC Radio 4's Desert Island Discs, Michael said that his cannabis use was a problem; he wished he could smoke less of it and was constantly trying to do so. On 5 December 2009, in an interview with The Guardian, Michael explained he had cut back on cannabis and was smoking only "seven or eight" spliffs per day instead of the 25 per day he had formerly smoked. Michael also abused sleeping pills.

On 26 October 2011, Michael cancelled a performance at the Royal Albert Hall in London due to a viral infection. On 21 November, Vienna General Hospital admitted Michael after he complained of chest pains while at a hotel two hours before his performance at a venue there for his Symphonica Tour. Michael appeared to be "in good spirits" and responded well to treatment following his admission, but on 25 November hospital officials said that his condition had "worsened overnight". This development led to cancellations and postponements of Michael's remaining 2011 performances, which had been scheduled mainly for the United Kingdom. Michael was confirmed to have suffered from pneumonia and, until 1 December, was in an intensive care unit; at one point, he was comatose. On 21 December, the hospital discharged him. Michael told the press that he had undergone a tracheotomy, that the staff at the hospital had saved his life, and that he would perform a free concert for them. After waking from the coma, Michael had a temporary West Country English accent, and there was concern he had developed foreign accent syndrome.

On 16 May 2013, Michael sustained a head injury in a car accident on the M1 motorway, near St Albans in Hertfordshire and was airlifted to hospital. On 29 May, Michael's publicist confirmed that he had left the hospital and that his injuries were superficial. In 2014, Michael stated that he had refrained from using cannabis for one and one half years. In June 2015, he checked into a drug rehabilitation facility in Switzerland.

=== Politics ===
To call us Thatcherite was so simplistic, basically saying that if you've got a deep enough tan and made a bit of money then you've got to be a Thatcherite.

— Michael, a Labour voter throughout the 1980s, distancing himself from Thatcher's Conservative Party.

Michael's father was a communist. At the age of fifteen, Michael joined the Young Communist League, under his Greek name. During the time of Margaret Thatcher as the Conservative Prime Minister of the United Kingdom throughout the 1980s, Michael voted Labour. In September 1984, Wham! performed at a benefit concert at London's Royal Festival Hall for the striking UK miners.

In 2000, Michael joined Melissa Etheridge, Garth Brooks, Queen Latifah, Pet Shop Boys, and k.d. lang, to perform in Washington, D.C. as part of Equality Rocks, a concert to benefit the Human Rights Campaign, an American LGBTQ rights group. His 2002 single "Shoot the Dog" was critical of the friendly relationship between the UK and US governments, in particular the relationship between Tony Blair and George W. Bush, with their involvement in the war on terror. Michael voiced his concern about the lack of public consultation in the UK regarding the war on terror: "On an issue as enormous as the possible bombing of Iraq, how can you represent us when you haven't asked us what we think?"

In 2006, Michael performed a free concert for NHS nurses in London to thank the nurses who had cared for his late mother. He told the audience: "Thank you for everything you do — some people appreciate it. Now if we can only get the government to do the same thing."

In 2007, Michael sent the £1,450,000 piano that John Lennon used to write "Imagine" around the United States on a "peace tour", displaying at places where notable acts of violence had taken place, such as Dallas' Dealey Plaza, where US President John F. Kennedy had been shot. He devoted his 2007 concert in Sofia, during his 25 Live tour, to the Bulgarian nurses prosecuted in the HIV trial in Libya. On 17 June 2008, Michael said he was thrilled by California's legalisation of same-sex marriage, calling the move "way overdue".

=== Philanthropy ===
In November 1984, Michael joined other British and Irish pop stars of the era to form Band Aid, singing on the charity song "Do They Know It's Christmas?" for famine relief in Ethiopia. This single became the UK Christmas number one in December 1984, holding Michael's own song, "Last Christmas" by Wham!, at No. 2. "Do They Know It's Christmas?" sold 3.75 million copies in the UK and became the biggest-selling single in UK chart history, a title it held until 1997 when it was overtaken by Elton John's "Candle in the Wind 1997", released in tribute to Diana, Princess of Wales following her death (Michael attended Diana's funeral with Elton John). Michael donated the royalties from "Last Christmas" to Band Aid and subsequently sang with Elton John at Live Aid (the Band Aid charity concert) in 1985.

In 1986, Michael took part in the Prince's Trust charity concert held at Wembley Arena, performing "Everytime You Go Away" alongside Paul Young. In 1988, Michael participated in the Nelson Mandela 70th Birthday Tribute at Wembley Stadium in London together with many other singers (such as Annie Lennox and Sting), performing "Sexual Healing".

An LGBTQ rights campaigner and HIV/AIDS charity fundraiser, the proceeds from the 1991 single "Don't Let the Sun Go Down on Me" were divided among 10 different charities for children, AIDS and education. He was also a patron of the Elton John AIDS Foundation. Michael wore a red ribbon at the Freddie Mercury Tribute Concert at Wembley Stadium in April 1992. He was instrumental in bringing the compilation album Red Hot + Dance to fruition, contributing three original songs, with the album featuring Seal and Madonna among others.

In 2003, he paired up with Ronan Keating on the UK edition of the game show Who Wants to Be a Millionaire? and won £32,000, after having their original £64,000 winnings halved by answering the £125,000 question incorrectly. The same year, Michael joined other celebrities to support a campaign to help raise £20 million for terminally ill children run by the Rainbow Trust Children's Charity of which he was a patron. He said: "Loss is such an incredibly difficult thing. I bow down to people who actually have to deal with the loss of a child."

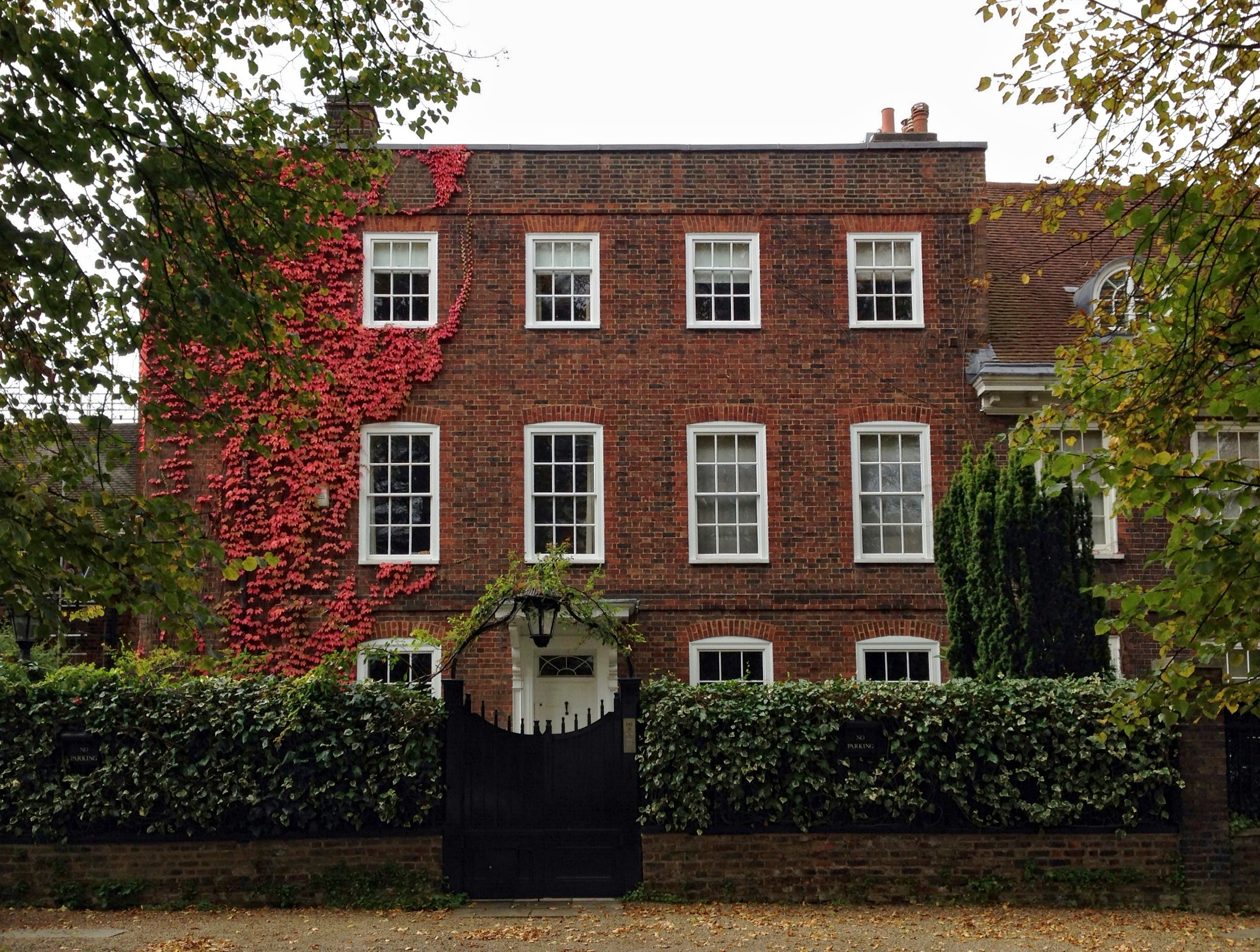
5, The Grove, Michael's home in Highgate, north London, is a grade II listed building.

From 2005 until his death, Michael was a patron of the Swan Lifeline charity. At the time he had moved to his home in Highgate, the river at the end of his garden was occupied by swans. A neighbour, who was involved with the charity, asked him if he would be interested, and he immediately agreed.

Following Michael's death, various charities revealed that Michael had privately supported them for many years. Those charities included Childline (to whom he had donated "millions"), the Terrence Higgins Trust, and Macmillan Cancer Support. Michael also donated to individuals: he reportedly called the production team of the quiz show Deal or No Deal after a contestant had revealed that she needed £15,000 to fund IVF treatment and anonymously paid for the treatment. Michael once tipped a student nurse working as a barmaid £5,000 because she was in debt. On 3 January 2017, another woman came forward and (with the permission of Michael's family) revealed he had anonymously paid for her IVF treatment after seeing her talk about her problems conceiving on an episode of This Morning in 2010. The woman gave birth to a girl in 2012.

After his death, it was also revealed that Michael had been anonymously paying for an annual Christmas tree erected where he lived in Highgate, as well as funding the Christmas lights, for the previous decade. He was also the largest funder of Highgate's annual Fair in the Square for those ten years, donating anonymously as "a local resident".

=== Assets ===
Between 2006 and 2008, according to reports, Michael earned £48.5 million from the 25 Live tour alone. In July 2014, he was reported to have been a celebrity investor in a tax avoidance scheme called Liberty. According to the Sunday Times Rich List 2015 of the wealthiest British musicians, Michael was worth £105 million.

== Death ==
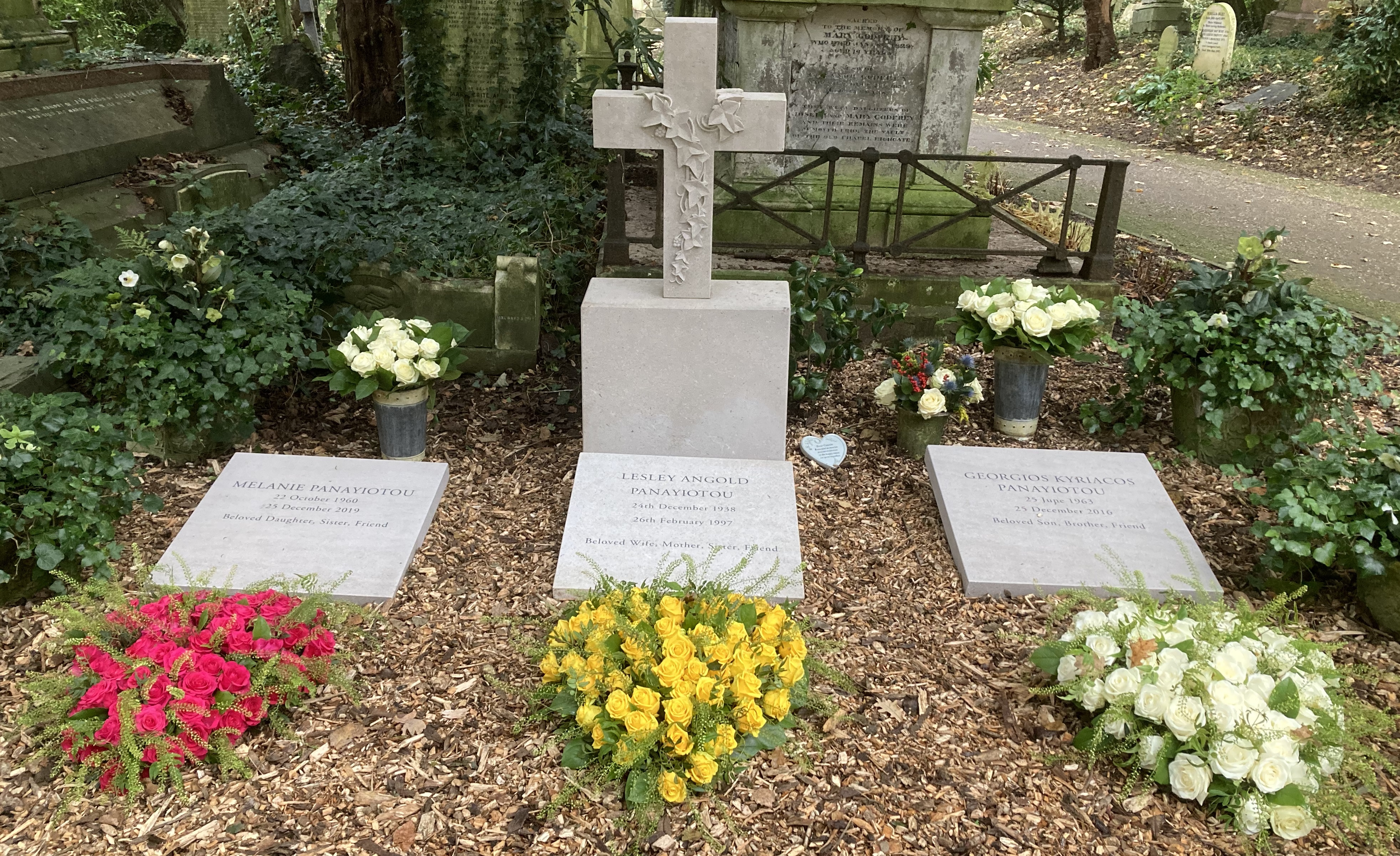
Grave of Michael (right) alongside his mother and sister in Highgate Cemetery

In the early hours of Christmas Day 2016, Michael died in bed at his home in Goring-on-Thames, at the age of 53. He was found by his partner, Fadi Fawaz. In March 2017, a senior coroner in Oxfordshire attributed Michael's death to natural causes due to dilated cardiomyopathy with myocarditis and fatty liver disease.

Owing to the delay in determining the cause of death, Michael's funeral was held on 29 March 2017. In a private ceremony, he was buried beside his mother's grave at Highgate Cemetery in north London. His sister Melanie, who died three years to the day after him, is buried on the other side of their mother.

=== Aftermath ===
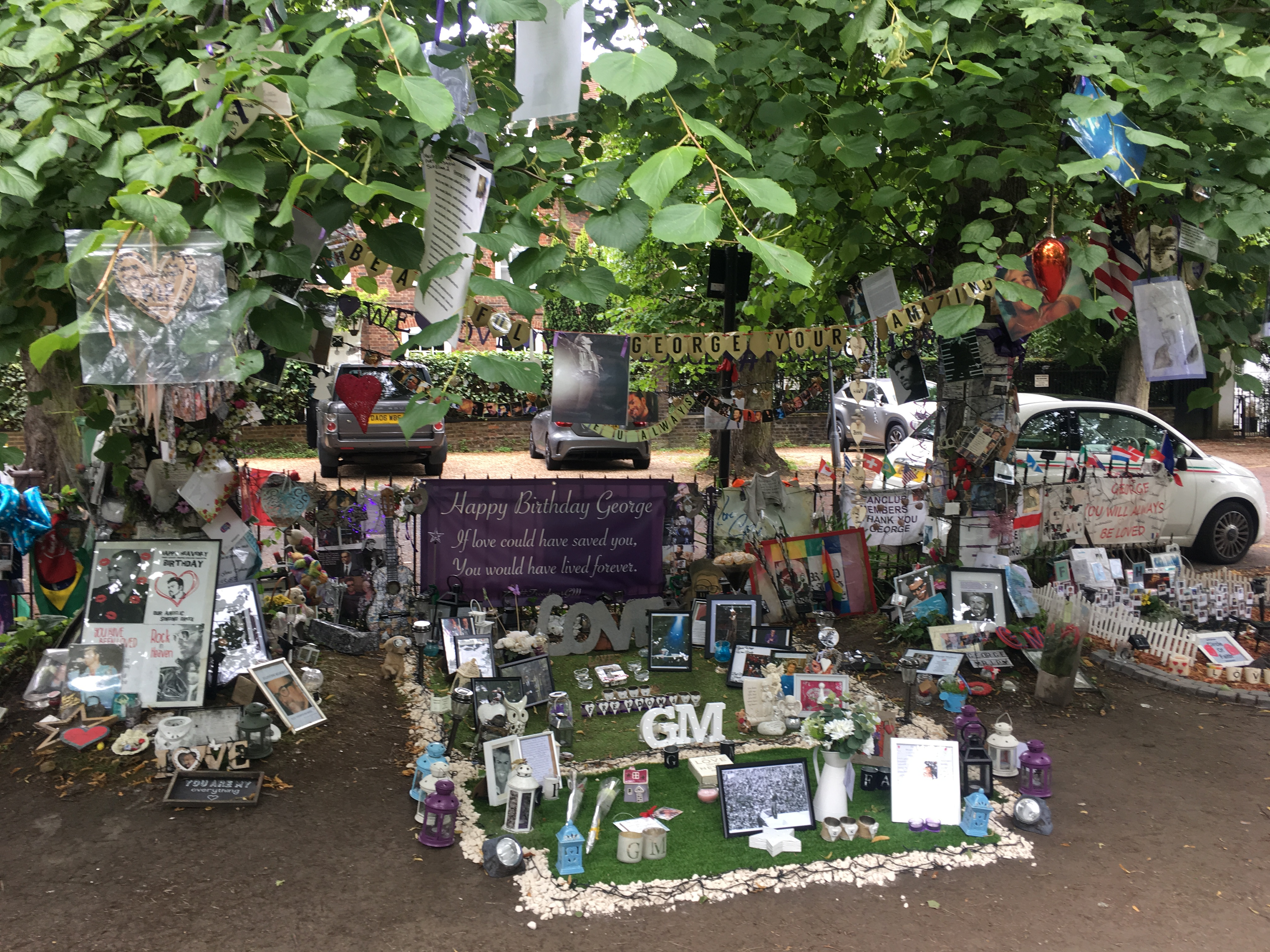
Unofficial memorial garden outside Michael's home in Highgate, 29 July 2017

In the summer of 2017, a temporary informal memorial garden was created outside Michael's former home in The Grove, Highgate. The site, in a private square that Michael had owned, was tended by fans for approximately eighteen months until it was cleared.

In March 2019, Michael's art collection was auctioned in England for £11.3 million. The proceeds were donated to various philanthropic organisations Michael gave to while he was alive.

Michael's will left most of his £97 million estate to his sisters, his father and friends. It did not include bequests to either Fawaz or to his former partner, Kenny Goss. In 2021, following legal proceedings, the trustees of Michael's estate entered into a financial settlement with Goss.

== Tributes ==
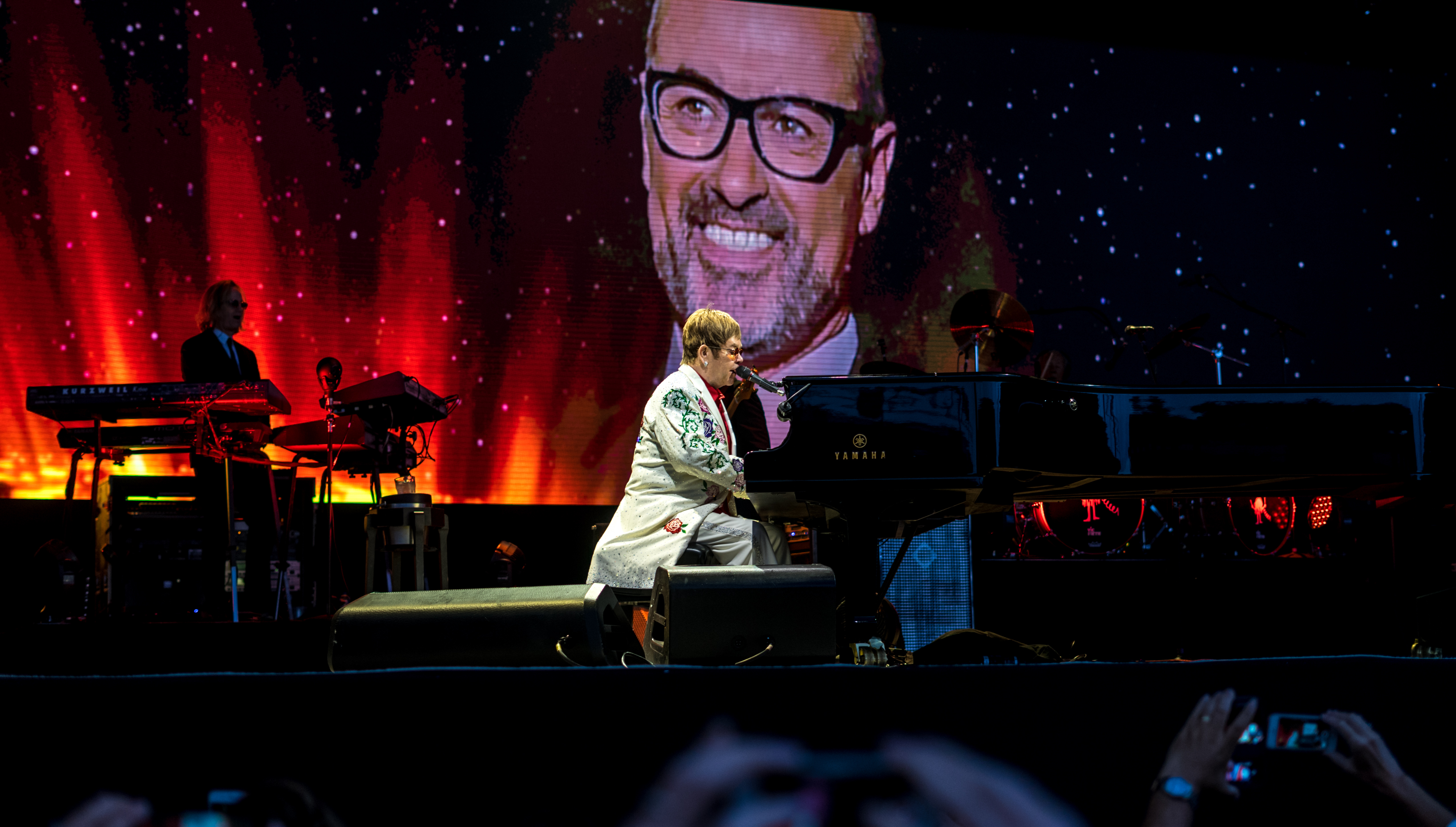
Elton John performing a tribute to Michael at Twickenham, London, in June 2017

Elton John was among those who paid tribute to Michael, emotionally addressing the audience on the Las Vegas Strip on 28 December, "What a singer, what a songwriter. But more than anything as a human being he was one of the kindest, sweetest, most generous people I've ever met."

At the 59th Annual Grammy Awards on 12 February 2017, Adele performed a slow version of "Fastlove" in tribute to Michael. On 22 February, Coldplay lead singer Chris Martin performed "A Different Corner" at the 2017 Brit Awards. In June, Michael's close friend, former Spice Girls member Geri Halliwell, released a charity single, "Angels in Chains", a tribute to him, to raise money for Childline.

In 2020, Michael was commemorated with a mural in his native borough of Brent. The artwork, which formed part of the Brent Biennial, was commissioned to pay tribute to his contribution to the fields of music and entertainment. Artist Dawn Mellor said it celebrates Michael as a pioneering cultural and LGBTQ figure. In February 2024, the Royal Mint unveiled a collectable coin featuring Michael wearing his trademark sunglasses.

== Awards and achievements ==
Michael won numerous music awards throughout his 30-year career, including five Brit Awards—winning Best British Male Artist twice, four MTV Video Music Awards, six Ivor Novello Awards, four American Music Awards (including two in the traditionally-black Soul/R&B category), and two Grammy Awards from eight nominations. In 2015, he was ranked 45th in Billboard's list of the "Greatest Hot 100 Artists of All Time". The Radio Academy stated that Michael was the most frequently played artist on British radio during the period 1984–2004. In 2019, Michael was named as the greatest artist of all time by Smooth Radio. In 2023, Michael was nominated for induction into the Rock and Roll Hall of Fame. On 3 May 2023, Michael was selected as an inductee to the 2023 class alongside Kate Bush, Willie Nelson, The Spinners, Missy Elliott and Rage Against the Machine. In November 2023, Michael was inducted into the Hall, with Andrew Ridgeley as his induction presenter.

== Discography and record sales ==
At the time of his death, Michael was estimated to have sold between 100 million and 125 million records worldwide. As a solo artist, he is estimated to have sold over 100 million records, making him one of the best-selling music artists. He is estimated to have sold up to 30 million records with Wham!. His debut solo album Faith sold more than 25 million copies.

Wham! discography

- Fantastic (1983)
- Make It Big (1984)
- Music from the Edge of Heaven (1986)

Boogie Box High discography

- Outrageous (1989)

Solo discography

- Faith (1987)
- Listen Without Prejudice Vol. 1 (1990)
- Older (1996)
- Songs from the Last Century (1999)
- Patience (2004)

== Tours ==
- The Faith Tour (1988–1989)
- Cover to Cover (1991)
- 25 Live (2006–2008)
- George Michael Live in Australia (2010)
- Symphonica Tour (2011–2012)

== See also ==
- Imagine Piano Peace Project
- List of artists with the most UK singles chart number ones
- List of artists who reached number one in the United States
- List of best-selling music artists
- Panayiotou v Sony Music Entertainment (UK) Ltd.
