= Wham! discography =

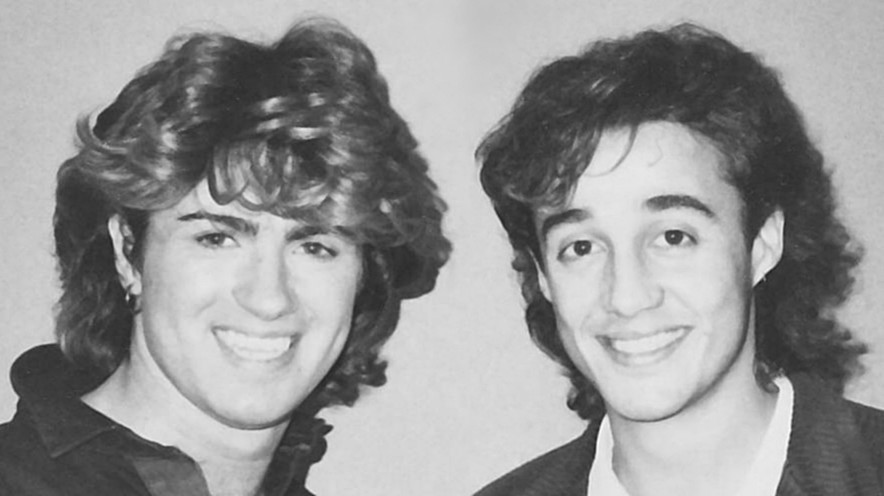
- George Michael and Andrew Ridgeley, c. 1985
- Studio albums: 3
- Extended plays: 1
- Compilation albums: 4
- Remix albums: 2
- Singles: 14
- Promotional singles: 1
- Video albums: 4
- Music videos: 19
- Films: 4
- Box sets: 1

English musical duo Wham! released three studio albums (three in North America and Japan, two in all other territories), four compilation albums, four video albums, 19 music videos, 14 singles, one promotional single, two remix albums and four documentary films.

== Albums ==
=== Studio albums ===
List of studio albums, with selected chart positions and certifications
Title	Details	Peak chart positions										Certifications
Title	Details	UK	AUS	GER	JPN	NL	NOR	NZ	SWE	SWI	US	Certifications
Fantastic	Released: 1 July 1983; Label: Innervision (#IVL 25328); Formats: LP, CD, cassette	1	6	7	17	8	8	1	15	25	83	BPI: 3× Platinum; ARIA: Gold; RIAA: Gold
Make It Big	Released: 15 October 1984; Label: Columbia (#COL 86311); Formats: LP, CD, cassette	1	1	5	1	1	1	1	3	1	1	BPI: 4× Platinum; ARIA: Platinum; BVMI: Gold; RIAA: 6× Platinum
Music from the Edge of Heaven	Released: 27 June 1986 (North America and Japan); Label: Columbia; Formats: LP, CD, cassette	—	—	—	9	—	—	—	—	—	10	RIAA: Platinum
"—" denotes a recording that did not chart or was not released in that territory.

=== Compilation albums ===
List of compilation albums, with selected chart positions and certifications
Title	Details	Peak chart positions										Certifications
Title	Details	UK	AUS	AUT	GER	JPN	NL	NZ	SWE	SWI	US	Certifications
The Final	Released: 7 July 1986; Label: Epic (#EPC 88681); Formats: 2×LP, CD, cassette	2	5	3	2	11	1	1	16	2	—	BPI: Platinum; BVMI: Gold
The Best of Wham!: If You Were There...	Released: 24 November 1997; Label: Epic (#4890202); Formats: CD, cassette, MD	4	29	23	40	30	18	29	—	28	—	BPI: 2× Platinum; ARIA: Gold
Japanese Singles Collection: Greatest Hits	Released: 11 November 2020; Label: Sony Music Japan (#); Formats: CD, DVD	—	—	—	—	34	—	—	—	—	—	
The Singles: Echoes from the Edge of Heaven	Released: 7 July 2023; Label: Sony Music (#); Formats: 2×LP, CD	2	23	35	12	—	10	22	—	17	31	BPI: Silver; RMNZ: Gold
"—" denotes a recording that did not chart or was not released in that territory.

=== Box set ===
List of compilation albums, with selected chart positions and certifications
Title	Details	Peak chart positions
Title	Details	NL
Original Album Classics	Released: 23 March 2015; Label: Sony, Epic, Legacy; Formats: 3CD; Note: Contains all 3 Wham! albums	96

=== Remix albums ===
List of remix albums, with selected chart positions
Title	Details	Peak chart positions
Title	Details	JPN
12" Mixes	Released: 1988; Label: Epic; Formats: CD, cassette	72
The Best Remixes	Released: 21 April 1989 (Japan); Label: Epic; Format: CD	—
"—" denotes a recording that did not chart or was not released in that territory.

=== Video albums ===
List of video albums, with selected details and certifications
Title	Details	Certifications	Peak pos.	
Title	Details	Certifications	UK	US
Wham!: The Video	Released: 1984; Label: CBS/Fox Video; Format: VHS, LaserDisc	RIAA: Gold	1	1
Wham!: 85	Released: 1985; Label: CBS/Fox Video; Format: VHS			
Wham!: The Final	Released: 1986; Label: CBS/Fox Video; Format: VHS, Betamax	RIAA: Gold		
The Best of Wham!	Released: 24 November 1997, 2001; Format: VHS, VCD, DVD	BPI: Gold	8	

== Extended plays ==
Title	Details	Peak chart positions									Sales	Certifications
Title	Details	UK	AUS	AUT	GER	IRE	NLD	SWE	SWI	US	Sales	Certifications
Wham! 10 Days in China - The Live EP	Scheduled release: 4 December 2026; Label: Sony Music; Formats: CD, LP	TBA										
"—" denotes a recording that did not chart or was not released in that territory.

== Singles ==
List of singles, with selected chart positions and certifications, showing year released and album name
Title	Year	Peak chart positions										Certifications	Album
Title	Year	UK	AUS	AUT	BEL	GER	IRE	NL	NOR	SWI	US	Certifications	Album
"Wham Rap! (Enjoy What You Do)" (Note: "Wham Rap! (Enjoy What You Do)" was originally released in May 1982 in the UK but failed to chart.)	1982	—	—	—	—	—	—	—	—	—	—		Fantastic
"Young Guns (Go for It)"	1982	3	4	—	8	20	3	9	10	—	—	BPI: Silver	Fantastic
"Wham Rap! (Enjoy What You Do)" (reissue)	1983	8	9	—	12	17	13	9	—	—	—		Fantastic
"Bad Boys"	1983	2	9	—	8	12	3	26	8	6	60	BPI: Silver	Fantastic
"Club Tropicana"	1983	4	60	—	23	13	4	14	10	—	—	BPI: Platinum	Fantastic
"Club Fantastic Megamix"	1983	15	—	—	—	56	16	44	—	—	—		Non-album single
"Wake Me Up Before You Go-Go"	1984	1	1	6	1	2	1	1	1	2	1	BPI: 3× Platinum; ARIA: 2× Platinum; BVMI: Gold; MC: Platinum; RIAA: Platinum	Make It Big
"Careless Whisper" (Note: In the United States and Canada, "Careless Whisper" was credited to Wham! featuring George Michael, whereas the single was credited in most other markets to George Michael as a solo artist.)	1984	1	1	2	2	3	1	1	2	1	1	BPI: 2× Platinum; ARIA: 2× Platinum; BVMI: Gold; MC: Platinum; RIAA: 6x Platinum	Make It Big
"Freedom"	1984	1	3	23	2	14	1	3	1	5	3	BPI: Gold	Make It Big
"Everything She Wants" (Note: "Everything She Wants" and "Last Christmas" were released as a double A-side in the UK, Ireland and the Netherlands. This record reached number 2 in the UK charts, with the re-issue of "Last Christmas" classed as a separate hit by the Official Charts Company, reaching number 1 in 2021.)	1984	2	7	5	9	8	21	8	2	—	1	BPI: Gold; MC: Gold; RIAA: Gold	Make It Big
"Last Christmas"	1984	1	2	1	2	1	1	1	2	1	2	BPI: 9× Platinum; ARIA: 8× Platinum; BVMI: 3× Platinum; RIAA: 9× Platinum	Music from the Edge of Heaven / The Final
"I'm Your Man"	1985	1	3	14	3	7	1	3	4	7	3	BPI: Gold; MC: Gold	Music from the Edge of Heaven / The Final
"The Edge of Heaven" (Note: "The Edge of Heaven" and "Where Did Your Heart Go?" were released as a double A-side in Ireland.)	1986	1	2	11	1	4	1	1	2	4	10	BPI: Silver	Music from the Edge of Heaven / The Final
"Where Did Your Heart Go?"	1986	—	54	23	—	—	1	37	—	—	50		Music from the Edge of Heaven / The Final
"—" denotes a recording that did not chart or was not released in that territory.

=== Promotional singles ===
List of promotional singles, showing year released and album name
Title	Year	Album
"Everything She Wants '97"	1997	The Best of Wham!: If You Were There...

== "Last Christmas" re-issue and re-entry positions ==
List of re-entry chart positions and certifications for "Last Christmas"
Title	Year	Peak chart positions										Certifications	Album
Title	Year	UK	AUS	AUT	GER	IRE	NL	NOR	SWE	SWI	US	Certifications	Album
"Last Christmas" (re-entry)	1985	6	—	—	—	—	—	2	7	6	—		Music from the Edge of Heaven / The Final
"Last Christmas" (re-entry)	1986	45	—	—	—	—	—	—	—	—	—		Music from the Edge of Heaven / The Final
"Last Christmas" (re-entry)	2007	14	—	4	4	22	6	8	14	10	—		Music from the Edge of Heaven / The Final
"Last Christmas" (re-entry)	2008	26	—	6	16	34	5	6	10	15	—		Music from the Edge of Heaven / The Final
"Last Christmas" (re-entry)	2009	34	—	9	14	36	19	10	16	12	—		Music from the Edge of Heaven / The Final
"Last Christmas" (re-entry)	2010	57	—	11	23	—	32	—	11	14	—		Music from the Edge of Heaven / The Final
"Last Christmas" (re-entry)	2011	26	—	17	25	33	51	10	4	34	—		Music from the Edge of Heaven / The Final
"Last Christmas" (re-entry)	2012	34	—	16	26	42	47	16	4	24	—		Music from the Edge of Heaven / The Final
"Last Christmas" (re-entry)	2013	36	—	25	30	35	22	10	3	31	—	BPI: Silver	Music from the Edge of Heaven / The Final
"Last Christmas" (re-entry)	2014	28	61	19	19	37	17	13	6	12	—	ARIA: Platinum	Music from the Edge of Heaven / The Final
"Last Christmas" (re-entry)	2015	18	—	15	15	18	11	14	8	19	—	BVMI: Platinum	Music from the Edge of Heaven / The Final
"Last Christmas" (re-entry)	2016	7	23	10	7	16	4	10	3	4	41	ARIA: 3× Platinum	Music from the Edge of Heaven / The Final
"Last Christmas" (re-entry)	2017	2	37	5	4	4	88	3	1	6	43		Music from the Edge of Heaven / The Final
"Last Christmas" (re-entry)	2018	3	5	3	3	7	4	3	1	3	25	BPI: 2× Platinum	Music from the Edge of Heaven / The Final
"Last Christmas" (re-entry)	2019	3	3	2	2	4	2	2	1	3	11	ARIA: 4× Platinum	Music from the Edge of Heaven / The Final
"Last Christmas" (re-entry)	2020	1	2	2	2	4	2	2	2	3	9	BPI: 3× Platinum	Music from the Edge of Heaven / The Final
"Last Christmas" (re-entry)	2021	2	2	1	1	2	2	4	1	2	7	BPI: 4× Platinum	Music from the Edge of Heaven / The Final
"Last Christmas" (re-entry)	2022	1	3	1	1	1	2	4	1	2	4	BPI: 5× Platinum	Music from the Edge of Heaven / The Final
"Last Christmas" (re-entry)	2023	1	3	1	2	2	2	3	1	2	4	ARIA: 7× Platinum	Music from the Edge of Heaven / The Final
"Last Christmas" (re-entry)	2024	1	2	1	1	1	1	2	1	2	3	BPI: 7× Platinum; ARIA: 8× Platinum; RIAA: 7× Platinum	Music from the Edge of Heaven / The Final
"Last Christmas" (re-entry)	2025	1	—	1	1	2	1	2	1	1	2	RIAA: 9× Platinum	Music from the Edge of Heaven / The Final
"Last Christmas" (re-entry)	2026	12	—	1	4	11	14	2	4	8	14		Music from the Edge of Heaven / The Final
"—" denotes a recording that did not chart or was not released in that territory.

== Music videos ==
List of music videos, showing year released and directors
Title	Year	Director(s)
"Young Guns (Go for It)"	1982	Tim Pope
"Wham Rap! (Enjoy What You Do)"	1983	Chris Gabrin
"Bad Boys"	1983	Mike Brady
"Club Tropicana"	1983	Duncan Gibbins
"Wake Me Up Before You Go-Go"	1984	Andy Morahan
"Careless Whisper"	1984	Duncan Gibbins
"Freedom"	1984	Andy Morahan; Lindsay Anderson
"Everything She Wants"	1984	Andy Morahan
"Last Christmas"	1984	Andy Morahan
"I'm Your Man"	1985	Andy Morahan
"I'm Your Man" (Director's cut)	1985	Andy Morahan
"A Different Corner"	1986	Andy Morahan
"The Edge of Heaven"	1986	Andy Morahan
"Where Did Your Heart Go?"	1986	Andy Morahan; George Michael
"Last Christmas (Pudding Mix)"	2016	Andy Morahan
"Last Christmas (35th Anniversary Story Behind the Video version)"	2019	Andy Morahan
"Careless Whisper (Karaoke Version)"	2021	Duncan Gibbins
"Club Tropicana (Alternative Edit)"	2023	Duncan Gibbins
"Wake Me Up Before You Go-Go (Karaoke Version)"	2023	Andy Morahan

=== Audio videos (official) ===
List of audio videos, showing year released
Title	Year
"I'm Your Man (Extended Stimulation)"	2016
"Last Christmas"	2024
"Last Christmas (Live at Wembley Arena, December 2006)"	2024

=== Lyric videos (official) ===
List of lyric videos, showing year released
Title	Year
"Careless Whisper"	2019
"Last Christmas"	2019
"Club Tropicana (Balearic Breeze Remix)"	2023
"Club Tropicana"	2023
"Wake Me Up Before You Go-Go"	2024
"Careless Whisper" (Animated Version)	2024
"Last Christmas" (Animated Version)	2024

== Filmography ==
List of films, with selected details, notes and certifications
Title	Year	Role	Director	Type	Release details	Certifications	Peak pos.	
Title	Year	Role	Director	Type	Release details	Certifications	UK	US
Wham! in China: Foreign Skies	1986	Themselves	Lindsay Anderson	Documentary	Label: CBS/Fox Video, Epic; Format: VHS, Betamax, LaserDisc	RIAA: Gold	1	1
Wham!	2023	Themselves	Chris Smith	Documentary	Label: Netflix, Altitude Film Distribution; Format: streaming		-	-
Wham!: Last Christmas Unwrapped	2024	Themselves	Nigel Cole	Documentary	Label: BBC Music, Blink Films; Format: streaming		-	-
Wham! 10 Days in China	2026	Themselves	Mike Christie	Documentary	Label: BBC, Sony Music Entertainment, Sony Music Vision, Supercollider; Format: Digital VOD		-	-
