= The Final (concert) =

1986 concert by Wham!

- Farewell concert by Wham!
- Location: Wembley, London, England
- Venue: Wembley Stadium
- Associated album: The Final
- Date: 28 June 1986; 40 years ago
- Duration: six hours
- Guests: Elton John; Simon Le Bon
- Attendance: 72,000

Wham! concert chronology
- Whamamerica! (1985); The Final (1986)
George Michael concert chronology
Whamamerica! (1985)	The Final (1986)	The Faith Tour (1988–89)

The Final was the farewell concert by English pop duo Wham!. It was held at Wembley Stadium, London on Saturday 28 June 1986. A total of 72,000 people attended the event, which included support artists and special guests, such as Elton John and Simon Le Bon. The concert was preceded by the release of the greatest hits album of the same name.

== Background ==
Wham! had announced their breakup in 1986. On 1 March, Michael was a guest on the talk show Aspel & Company, where he announced that Wham! were to break up and were to perform one last show.

During production rehearsals for the Wembley concert, Wham! performed two warm-up shows in front of 4,000 people in aid of Capital Radio's "Help a London Child" charity on 23 and 24 June at the Brixton Academy in London. This was their first performance in the U.K. since December 1984.

== Synopsis ==
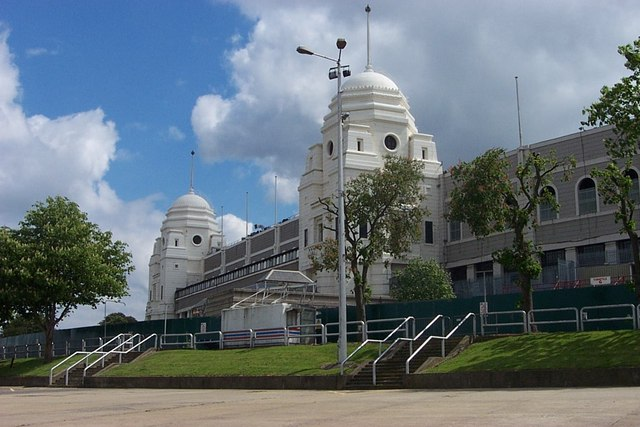
Original Wembley Stadium

The first ever public viewing of the Wham! in China: Foreign Skies documentary film was shown on large screens on either side of the stage. This set a record for the largest audience at a film premiere.

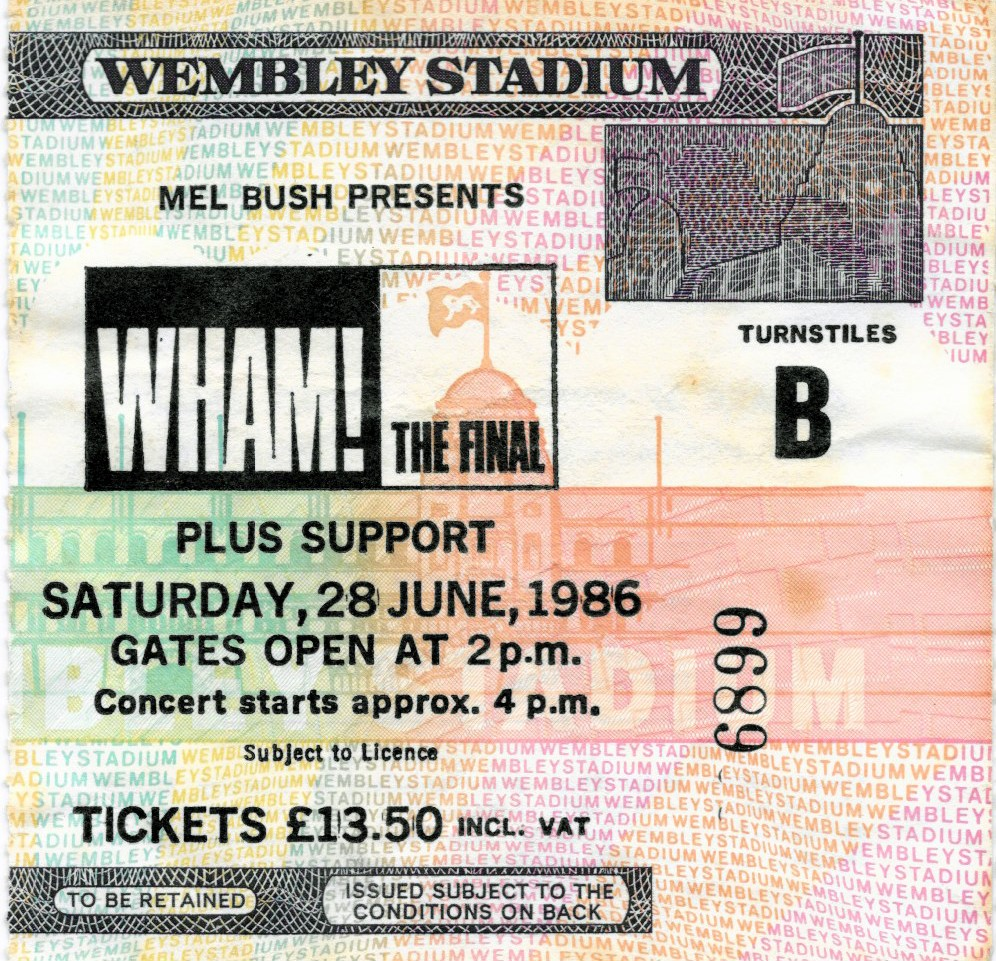
Ticket for the concert

At 7.35pm an eight-minute introduction to "Everything She Wants" began from behind a huge black curtain which had "The Final" written on it in huge white letters. It opened to reveal Michael—dressed in leather and black jeans, wearing sunglasses and dancing in sync with two other dancers. Ridgeley and Pepsi & Shirlie came to the stage. Ridgeley took off his black coat and strolled up the walkways and took off his black gloves. "Club Tropicana" followed. Michael spoke to the crowd: "This is the best thing I've ever looked at. We've got four years of thank-yous to say this evening... and I know we're going to enjoy saying them. So let's get started!". "Heartbeat" and "Battlestations" were performed.

Afterwards, during "Bad Boys", Pepsi & Shirlie made a brief appearance wearing bouffant wigs; included was "If You Were There". A large white piano was wheeled on stage and Elton John joined, dressed in Ronald McDonald make-up and costume, a shiny red wig, a red nose, a stripey red T-shirt and yellow dungarees. Guitarist David Austin joined and "The Edge of Heaven" began. Michael split the audience into three groups, with each group to sing a section of the "yeah yeah yeah" chorus. They performed John's 1973 hit "Candle in the Wind". "Credit Card Baby", "Like a Baby", "Love Machine" and "Where Did Your Heart Go?" followed in quick succession.

There was a pause before a cover of Carly Simon's "Why" was performed. Michael said "Happy Christmas" to the crowd and began the song "Last Christmas", then getting the audience to do the "wave" and everyone showed the orange side of their programmes. It transferred into "Wham Rap! (Enjoy What You Do)". After the ballad "A Different Corner" and "Freedom" ended, they disappeared for a short while and came back for "Careless Whisper" and "Young Guns (Go for It)". Michael ran around the stage performing "Wake Me Up Before You Go-Go".

The band came back to do the encore—their last song, "I'm Your Man". They were alone on stage. Michael took off his black jacket, while Ridgeley was in suede with denim flies. Elton John again joined in a pink mohican. Simon Le Bon (of Duran Duran) made a surprise entrance on stage. Wham! embraced, the moment captured on the large screens.

== Opening acts ==
- Gary Glitter
- Nick Heyward

== Set list ==
1. "Everything She Wants"
2. "Club Tropicana"
3. "Heartbeat"
4. "Battlestations"
5. "Bad Boys"
6. "If You Were There"
7. "The Edge of Heaven"
8. "Candle in the Wind" (featuring Elton John)
9. "Credit Card Baby"
10. "Like a Baby"
11. "Love Machine"
12. "Where Did Your Heart Go?"
13. "Why"
14. "Last Christmas"
15. "Wham Rap! (Enjoy What You Do)"
16. "A Different Corner"
17. "Freedom"
18. "Careless Whisper"
19. "Young Guns (Go for It)"
20. "Wake Me Up Before You Go-Go"
21. "I'm Your Man" (featuring Elton John and Simon Le Bon)

== Personnel ==
- George Michael – lead vocals
- Andrew Ridgeley – guitar
- Helen "Pepsi" DeMacque – backing vocals
- Shirlie Holliman – backing vocals

== Notes ==
In an interview in October 2019, Ridgeley said that the concert was unlikely to be released, stating, "I would love that to happen, but it was never actually filmed or recorded for broadcast and George felt it wasn't of the quality that he would be prepared to be made public."

In 2019, Ridgeley also said of the concert, that he had wanted to take the show internationally and that he was disappointed, saying, "I felt that it was a slight betrayal of the fans who had supported us globally."
