= The Final (album) =

Greatest hits album by Wham!
- Released: 7 July 1986
- Recorded: 1982 – March 1986
- Length: 80:24 (double LP and cassette version); 71:07 (CD version)
- Label: Epic
- Producers: George Michael; Andrew Ridgeley; Steve Brown

Wham! chronology
Music from the Edge of Heaven (1986)	The Final (1986)	The Best of Wham!: If You Were There... (1997)

Singles from The Final
- 1. "Last Christmas" Released: 3 December 1984; 2. "I'm Your Man" Released: 11 November 1985; 3. "A Different Corner" Released: 24 March 1986; 4. "The Edge of Heaven" Released: 9 June 1986; 5. "Where Did Your Heart Go?" Released: October 1986

Professional ratings
Review scores
Source	Rating
AllMusic	4/5 stars

The Final is a greatest hits album released in 1986 to summarise the career of English pop duo Wham!. The album was not initially released in North America, where the studio album Music from the Edge of Heaven was released instead. Six songs from that album appear on this compilation. The Final coincided with the farewell concert of the same name on 28 June 1986, at Wembley Stadium.

The CD edition omits "Blue (Armed with Love)" and the extended mixes of "Bad Boys", "Careless Whisper" and "I'm Your Man". A deluxe edition of the album was released on CD/DVD and download in November 2011, with the DVD featuring all of Wham!'s music videos, including the video for "Young Guns (Go for It!)", "Last Christmas", and a remix version of the video for "Everything She Wants". It follows the track listing of the CD, with the exception of "Battlestations", as it was a B-side and not an official single.

== Background ==
When George Michael guested on the Aspel & Company talk show on 1 March 1986, he announced that Wham! were to split and perform one last concert, entitled the Final. He also announced that he planned to record the last Wham! single with Andrew Ridgeley the following week in Los Angeles. In fact, as he revealed to journalist Paula Yates on The Tube, he was planning to record four tracks, two of which—"Where Did Your Heart Go?" and "The Edge of Heaven"—had been previously played on the Whamamerica! tour, with the other two being new tracks he was experimenting with. This was prior to the filming of the video for Michael's then-forthcoming solo single, "A Different Corner". Michael was planning to release three of the tracks as part of a Wham! EP, but was not sure which one of the songs was going to be the main single at that point. All of these would appear on The Final. As of 12 March 1986, the album and single had been completed and ready for release under the Wham! name.

== Track listing ==
=== Double LP/cassette ===
All tracks are written by George Michael, except where noted.

Side one
No.	Title	Writer(s)	Original release	Length
1.	"Wham Rap! (Enjoy What You Do)" (special US re-mix)	Michael; Andrew Ridgeley	Fantastic, 1983	6:43
2.	"Young Guns (Go for It)" (12" UK version)		Fantastic	5:09
3.	"Bad Boys" (12" version)		Fantastic	4:52
4.	"Club Tropicana"	Michael; Ridgeley	Fantastic	4:25

Side two
No.	Title	Writer(s)	Original release	Length
1.	"Wake Me Up Before You Go-Go"		Make It Big, 1984	3:51
2.	"Careless Whisper" (12" UK version)	Michael; Ridgeley	Make It Big	6:31
3.	"Freedom" (7" US version)		Make It Big	5:20
4.	"Last Christmas" (Pudding mix)		Music from the Edge of Heaven, 1986	6:47

Side three
No.	Title	Original release	Length
1.	"Everything She Wants" (long remix)	Make It Big	6:34
2.	"I'm Your Man" (Extended Stimulation)	Music from the Edge of Heaven	6:50
3.	"Blue (Armed with Love)"	"Club Tropicana" single, 1983	3:50

Side four
No.	Title	Writer(s)	Original release	Length
1.	"A Different Corner"		Music from the Edge of Heaven	3:59
2.	"Battlestations"		Music from the Edge of Heaven	5:27
3.	"Where Did Your Heart Go?" (Was (Not Was) cover) (12" version)	David Was; Don Was	Music from the Edge of Heaven	5:45
4.	"The Edge of Heaven"		Music from the Edge of Heaven	4:37

=== CD ===
No.	Title	Writer(s)	Original release	Length
1.	"Wham Rap! (Enjoy What You Do)" (special US re-mix)	Michael; Ridgeley	Fantastic	6:43
2.	"Young Guns (Go for It)" (12" version)		Fantastic	5:09
3.	"Bad Boys"		Fantastic	3:20
4.	"Club Tropicana"	Michael; Ridgeley	Fantastic	4:25
5.	"Wake Me Up Before You Go-Go"		Make It Big	3:51
6.	"Careless Whisper" (7" version)	Michael; Ridgeley	Make It Big	5:02
7.	"Freedom" (7" version)		Make It Big	5:20
8.	"Last Christmas" (Pudding mix)		Music from the Edge of Heaven	6:47
9.	"Everything She Wants" (remix)		Make It Big	6:30
10.	"I'm Your Man"		Music from the Edge of Heaven	4:04
11.	"A Different Corner"		Music from the Edge of Heaven	3:59
12.	"Battlestations"		Music from the Edge of Heaven	5:27
13.	"Where Did Your Heart Go?" (12" version)	Dave Was; Don Was	Music from the Edge of Heaven	5:45
14.	"The Edge of Heaven"		Music from the Edge of Heaven	4:37

=== DVD ===
Track listing
1. "Wham Rap! (Enjoy What You Do?)" (Michael, Ridgeley); 2. "Young Guns (Go for It!)"; 3. "Bad Boys"; 4. "Club Tropicana" (Michael, Ridgeley); 5. "Wake Me Up Before You Go-Go"; 6. "Careless Whisper" (Michael, Ridgeley); 7. "Freedom"; 8. "Last Christmas"; 9. "Everything She Wants" (remix); 10. "I'm Your Man"; 11. "A Different Corner"; 12. "Where Did Your Heart Go?" (Was, Was); 13. "The Edge of Heaven"

=== VHS ===
Track listing
(CBS Fox Video / 3846): 1. "Freedom" (not included on UK editions); 2. "I'm Your Man" (not included on UK editions); 3. "The Edge of Heaven"; 4. "A Different Corner"; 5. "Where Did Your Heart Go?"

== Charts ==
=== Weekly charts ===
Initial chart performance for The Final
Chart (1986)	Peak position
Australian Albums (Kent Music Report)	5
Austrian Albums (Ö3 Austria)	3
Dutch Albums (Album Top 100)	1
European Albums (Top 100)	5
Finnish Albums (Suomen virallinen lista)	11
French Albums (Oricon)	11
German Albums (Offizielle Top 100)	2
Italian Albums (Musica e Dischi)	2
New Zealand Albums (RMNZ)	1
Norwegian Albums (VG-lista)	7
Swedish Albums (Sverigetopplistan)	16
Swiss Albums (Schweizer Hitparade)	2
UK Albums (Official Charts)	2

Chart performance for The Final upon George Michael's death
Chart (2017)	Peak position
UK Albums Chart	74

=== Year-end charts ===
1986 year-end chart performance for The Final
Chart (1986)	Position
Australian Albums Chart	49
Austrian Albums Chart	21
Dutch Albums Chart	3
French Albums Chart	32
New Zealand Albums (RMNZ)	5

1989 year-end chart performance for The Final
Chart (1989)	Position
Dutch Albums Chart	95

== Certifications and sales ==
Certifications and sales for The Final
Region	Certification	Certified units/sales
Australia	—	50,000
Belgium (BRMA)	Platinum	50,000^{*}
France (SNEP)	Platinum	300,000^{*}
Germany (BVMI)	Gold	250,000^{^}
Hong Kong (IFPI Hong Kong)	Platinum	20,000^{*}
Japan (RIAJ)	Platinum	147,000
Netherlands (NVPI)	Platinum	100,000^{^}
New Zealand (RMNZ)	Platinum	15,000^{^}
Spain (Promusicae)	Gold	50,000^{^}
United Kingdom (BPI)	Platinum	300,000^{^}
^{*} Sales figures based on certification alone.^{^} Shipments figures based on certification alone.
