= The Best of Wham!: If You Were There... =

Greatest hits album by Wham!
- Released: 24 November 1997
- Recorded: 1982–1997
- Length: 70:24
- Label: Epic
- Producers: George Michael; Steve Brown; Bob Carter; Jon Douglas

Wham! chronology
The Final (1986)	The Best of Wham!: If You Were There... (1997)	Last Christmas: The Original Motion Picture Soundtrack (2019)

Professional ratings
Review scores
Source	Rating
AllMusic	4.5/5 stars

The Best of Wham!: If You Were There... is the second UK-released compilation to summarise the career of English pop duo Wham!. It was released on 24 November 1997, and peaked at number 4 on the UK Albums Chart. The end of the album features a hidden track that was first heard on the duo's debut album, Fantastic (1983).

== Track listing ==
All tracks are written by and produced by George Michael, except where noted.

No.	Title	Writer(s)	Producer(s)	Length
1.	"If You Were There" (The Isley Brothers cover) (from Make It Big, 1984)	Ernie Isley; Marvin Isley; Chris Jasper		3:43
2.	"I'm Your Man" (from Music from the Edge of Heaven, 1986)			4:06
3.	"Everything She Wants" (from Make It Big)			6:30
4.	"Club Tropicana" (from Fantastic, 1983)	Michael; Andrew Ridgeley	Steve Brown; Michael	4:30
5.	"Wake Me Up Before You Go-Go" (from Make It Big)			3:51
6.	"Like a Baby" (from Make It Big)			4:16
7.	"Freedom" (from Make It Big)			5:20
8.	"The Edge of Heaven" (from Music from the Edge of Heaven)			4:37
9.	"Wham Rap!" (from Fantastic)	Michael; Ridgeley	Bob Carter	6:46
10.	"Young Guns (Go for It!)" (from Fantastic)		Brown; Michael	3:41
11.	"Last Christmas" (from Music from the Edge of Heaven)			6:48
12.	"Where Did Your Heart Go?" (Was (Not Was) cover) (from Music from the Edge of Heaven)	Don Was; Dave Was		5:42
13.	"Everything She Wants '97"		Michael; Jon Douglas	6:01
14.	"I'm Your Man '96"		Michael; Douglas	4:32
Total length:				70:24

Notes

- "Everything She Wants '97" is a remix of the original song.
- "I'm Your Man '96" is a re-recording and remix of the original song.
- The cassette and MiniDisc editions featured "A Ray of Sunshine" as a bonus track, in between "Last Christmas" and "Where Did Your Heart Go?".

=== Video The Best of Wham! ===
The music video companion compilation was released on VHS, VCD and DVD.

All tracks are written by George Michael, except where noted.

No.	Title	Writer(s)	Length
1.	"Wham Rap!"	Michael; Ridgeley	3:15
2.	"Club Tropicana"	Michael; Ridgeley	4:31
3.	"Wake Me Up Before You Go-Go"		3:45
4.	"Last Christmas"		4:20
5.	"The Edge of Heaven"		4:25
6.	"Where Did Your Heart Go?"	Don Was; Dave Was	5:10
7.	"I'm Your Man"		5:40
8.	"Everything She Wants"		6:30
9.	"Freedom"		6:32

== Charts ==
=== Weekly charts ===
Initial chart performance for The Best of Wham!: If You Were There...
Chart (1997–2001)	Peak position
Australian Albums (ARIA)	29
Austrian Albums (Ö3 Austria)	23
Belgian Albums (Ultratop Flanders)	5
Belgian Albums (Ultratop Wallonia)	6
Dutch Albums (Album Top 100)	18
Dutch Midprice Albums (MegaCharts)	44
European Albums (Music & Media)	12
Finnish Albums (Suomen virallinen lista)	35
German Albums (Offizielle Top 100)	40
Hungarian Albums (MAHASZ)	10
Italian Albums (FIMI)	12
Italian Albums (Musica e Dischi)	14
Japanese Albums (Oricon)	30
New Zealand Albums (RMNZ)	29
Swiss Albums (Schweizer Hitparade)	28
UK Albums (Official Charts)	4

Chart performance for The Best of Wham!: If You Were There... upon George Michael's death
Chart (2017)	Peak position
French Albums (SNEP)	97
Italian Albums (FIMI)	81

=== Year-end charts ===
1997 year-end chart performance for The Best of Wham!: If You Were There...
Chart (1997)	Position
Belgian Albums Chart (Flanders)	22
Belgian Albums Chart (Wallonia)	24

1998 year-end chart performance for The Best of Wham!: If You Were There...
Chart (1998)	Position
Belgian Albums Chart (Flanders)	52
Belgian Albums Chart (Wallonia)	42

== Certifications ==
Certifications for The Best of Wham!: If You Were There...
Region	Certification	Certified units/sales
Australia (ARIA)	Gold	35,000^{^}
Belgium (BRMA)	Platinum	50,000^{*}
Japan (RIAJ)	Gold	100,000^{^}
Netherlands (NVPI)	Platinum	100,000^{^}
Poland (ZPAV)	Gold	50,000^{*}
Spain (Promusicae)	Gold	50,000^{^}
United Kingdom (BPI)	2× Platinum	600,000^{^}
^{*} Sales figures based on certification alone.^{^} Shipments figures based on certification alone.

Certifications for The Best of Wham! video
Region	Certification	Certified units/sales
United Kingdom (BPI)	Gold	25,000^{*}
^{*} Sales figures based on certification alone.
