= Whamamerica! =

1985 concert tour by Wham!

- Tour by Wham!
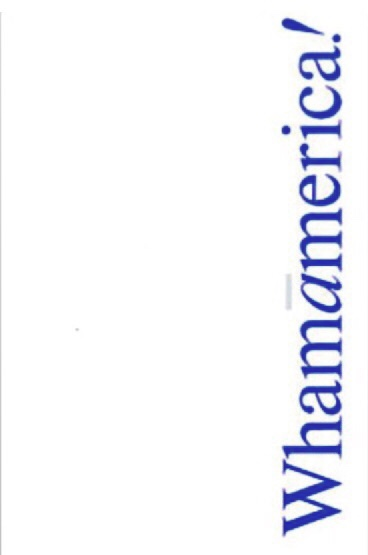
- Tour programme cover
- Location: North America
- Associated album: Make It Big
- Start date: 23 August 1985
- End date: 10 September 1985
- No. of shows: 10 in United States; 1 in Canada; 11 in total
- Supporting acts: The Pointer Sisters; Chaka Khan; Katrina and the Waves
- Attendance: 200,000 – 302,568
- Box office: US $8.6 million ($25.74 million in 2024 dollars)

Wham! concert chronology
- The Big Tour (1984–85); Whamamerica! (1985); The Final (1986)

Whamamerica! (also promoted as the Make It Big Tour '85) was a concert tour by English pop duo Wham!. The tour was launched following the success of their 1984 certified multi-platinum studio album Make It Big, which sold four million copies in the United States by the end of the year. The tour spanned nineteen days between August and September 1985, comprising nine shows across the United States and Canada.

== Overview ==
The Whamamerica! tour began in late August 1985. It travelled around the United States, opening at Poplar Creek Music Theater in Illinois in the Midwest, then heading across the border to Canada and all the way down the West Coast to northern and Southern California, south to Texas and then back east to Philadelphia and Detroit. Michael’s look had changed with his hair cut to a shorter length and the colour being close to his natural darker shade. He also had a new designer stubble and larger earrings, a yellow fringed jacket and leather gloves. Their last ever live US performance was at the Pontiac Silverdome in Detroit. They had played to over 302,568 fans.

== Opening acts ==
- Katrina and the Waves (Los Angeles, Houston, Oakland, Miami and Philadelphia)
- The Pointer Sisters (Toronto, Oakland, Miami)
- Chaka Khan (Los Angeles, Philadelphia)

== Set list ==
Philadelphia

1. "Everything She Wants"
2. "Credit Card Baby"
3. "Blue (Armed with Love)"
4. "If You Were There"
5. "The Edge of Heaven"
6. "Like a Baby"
7. "Wham Rap! (Enjoy What You Do)"
8. "Heartbeat"
9. "Where Did Your Heart Go?"
10. "Love Machine"
11. "Wake Me Up Before You Go-Go"
12. "Freedom"
13. "Careless Whisper"
14. "Good Times"
15. "Everything She Wants"

== Tour dates ==
List of concerts, showing date, city, country, venue, tickets sold, number of available tickets, and amount of gross revenue
Date	City	Country	Venue	Attendance	Gross	Ref.
North America
18 August 1985	Houston	United States	Six Flags AstroWorld			
19 August 1985	Houston	United States	Six Flags AstroWorld			
23 August 1985	Hoffman Estates	United States	Poplar Creek Music Theater			
25 August 1985	Hoffman Estates	United States	Poplar Creek Music Theater			
28 August 1985	Toronto	Canada	Exhibition Stadium	50,098 / sellout	$1,042,059 (CA$1,302,548)	
30 August 1985	Los Angeles	United States	Hollywood Park			
1 September 1985	Oakland	United States	Oakland Coliseum	46,737 / sellout	$817,897	
4 September 1985	Houston	United States	Southern Star Amphitheater			
6 September 1985	Miami	United States	Miami Baseball Stadium	36,390 / sellout	$545,855	
8 September 1985	Philadelphia	United States	Veterans Stadium	43,000 / 50,000	$698,000	
10 September 1985	Pontiac	United States	Pontiac Silverdome			

== Personnel ==
- George Michael – lead vocals
- Andrew Ridgeley – guitar
