= If You Were There =

If You Were There may refer to:

- The Best of Wham!: If You Were There..., a 1997 greatest hits album by Wham!
- "If You Were There", a 1973 song by the Isley Brothers from 3 + 3
- "If You Were There", a 1984 song by Wham! from Make It Big
