= Can the Rhythm =

Single by Girl Talk
- Released: 1983/1984
- Genre: Pop, dance
- Length: 3:50 (1983 version), 3:47 (1984 version)
- Label: Park Records, Innervision Records, Geffen Records
- Songwriter: Karen Wright
- Producers: Mick Clarke (1983 version), Stock Aitken & Waterman (1984 version)

Girl Talk singles chronology
"Marvellous Guy" (1984)	"Can the Rhythm" (1983)	"Always Playing (The Game of Love)" (1985)

Alternative cover
- 1983 original cover, with Leigh Pearce (right)

Picture disc (1984).

"Can the Rhythm" is a song by British female pop duo Girl Talk. The song was written solely by group member Karen Wright, who wrote it at the age of 12.

== 1983 version ==
The song was initially released as Girl Talk's debut single in 1983, produced by Mick Clarke and released on the label Park Records. At that point, the group was composed of Karen Wright and Leigh Pearce, who were aged 12 and 13 at the time. Wright sings the first verse and Pearce the second, with both singing on the song's chorus. The single did not hit the charts.

== 1984 version ==
In 1984, Pearce left the group and was replaced by Karen's sister Julie. The pair got signed by Innervision Records that year and re-released "Can the Rhythm" as their second single for that label in October 1984. This is the best-known version of the song.

For this release, the song was re-recorded with Karen and Julie on vocals, and was produced by Stock Aitken & Waterman. The trio of producers, who would become hugely successful in the late '80s in the UK, had established in 1984 as a production team, and by that time had had top 40 successes in the UK with Hazell Dean and Divine. "Can the Rhythm" was given a hi-NRG reworking similar to the sound of these artists.

The single was released in three formats: 7" single, 12" single, and a 10" shaped picture disc. The single made the charts in the UK, but only reached a low #92. It would become the group's only chart entry in the UK.

In December 1984, the single was released in the US by Geffen Records, where it peaked at #26 on the Billboard Hot Dance Club Play chart in January 1985, spending 5 weeks on the chart.

== Formats ==
- 1983 release

7" single

1. "Can the Rhythm" 3:51
2. "Can the Rhythm" (Instrumental) 3:45
- 1984 release

7" single, 10" picture disc

1. "Can the Rhythm" 3:47
2. "Can the Rhythm" (Instrumental) 4:30

12" single

1. "Can the Rhythm" (Extended Mix) 7:00
2. "Can the Rhythm" (Instrumental) 4:30

== Charts ==
Chart (1984)	Peak position
UK Singles Chart	92
U.S. Billboard Hot Dance Club Play	26
