= Girl Talk discography =

Girl Talk discography may refer to:

- The discography of Girl Talk (musical group)
- The discography of Girl Talk (musician)
