= Jimmy the Hoover =

British pop band

Jimmy the Hoover were a British pop band, who had a hit single with "Tantalise (Wo Wo Ee Yeh Yeh)". It was their only hit, reaching number 18 on the UK Singles Chart in July 1983.

== History ==
The band formed in 1982 and comprised Simon Barker (keyboards), Derek Dunbar (vocals), Karla Duplantier (drums), Flinto Chandia (bass) (later replaced by Cris Cole) and Mark Rutherford (guitar). Their manager Malcolm McLaren chose their name and gave them a support slot on a Bow Wow Wow tour. In 1983, they signed to CBS subsidiary Innervision, and the same year they had their only hit, "Tantalise (Wo Wo Ee Yeh Yeh)".

The track was produced by Steve Levine, who also produced Culture Club's multi-million selling Colour by Numbers album that same year. A promotional video for the single was directed by Derek Jarman.

A follow-up single "Kill Me Kwik", produced by Anne Dudley of Art of Noise fame, received positive reviews in the music press but failed to chart. The group were subsequently dropped by Innervision, their record label. In 1985, another single, "Bandana Street (Use It)", appeared on a new label, MCA Records, but with no further success.

== Discography (singles) ==
- "Tantalise (Wo Wo Ee Yeh Yeh)" (1983) CBS (UK No. 18, AUS No. 91)
- "Kill Me Kwik" (1983) CBS
- "Bandana Street (Use It)" (1985) MCA

== See also ==
- Malcolm McLaren
