= Music from the Edge of Heaven =

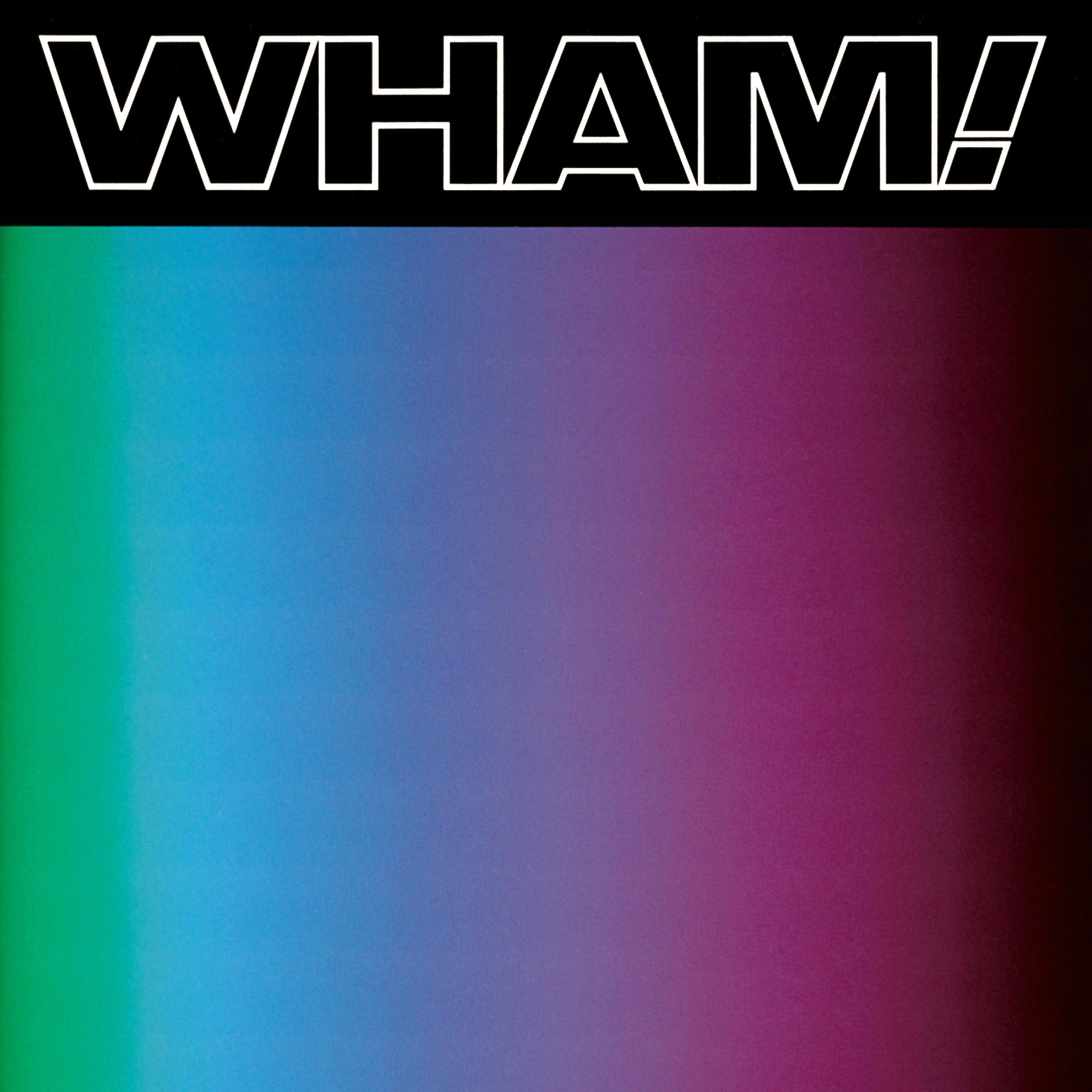
- North American cover artwork

Studio album by Wham!
- Released: 27 June 1986
- Recorded: August 1984 (Note: "Last Christmas"); 1985 (Note: "I'm Your Man" and "A Different Corner"); 1986
- Venue: Workers' Gymnasium (Beijing)
- Studios: Advision (London); Sarm West (London)
- Length: 45:14
- Labels: Columbia; Epic
- Producer: George Michael

Wham! chronology
Make It Big (1984)	Music from the Edge of Heaven (1986)	The Final (1986)

Singles from Music from the Edge of Heaven
- 1. "Last Christmas" Released: 3 December 1984; 2. "I'm Your Man" Released: 11 November 1985; 3. "A Different Corner" Released: 24 March 1986; 4. "The Edge of Heaven" Released: 9 June 1986; 5. "Where Did Your Heart Go?" Released: October 1986

Professional ratings
Review scores
Source	Rating
AllMusic	3.5/5 stars
Rolling Stone	(not rated)
Stylus Magazine	(Positive)

Music from the Edge of Heaven is the third and final studio album by the English pop duo Wham!. It was released on 27 June 1986 by Columbia Records in North America and on 21 July 1986 by Epic Records in Japan.

== Background ==
Between 1982 and 1985, the pop duo Wham! had released two studio albums, and enjoyed a string of successes, with three of their singles reaching number one on the UK singles chart. With the known desire of George Michael to move into a more adult market, Wham! announced in early 1986 that Michael and his musical partner Andrew Ridgeley would go their separate ways after a farewell single, album, and a concert.

The farewell single, "The Edge of Heaven", was released on 9 June 1986, and earned Wham! their fourth number one single in the UK. The farewell concert, entitled the Final, was held in front of 72,000 fans at London's Wembley Stadium on 28 June 1986. The accompanying greatest hits album, also entitled The Final, was released on 7 July 1986. In North America, a pared-down version of the album (Music from the Edge of Heaven) was issued instead, essentially serving as the group's third and final studio album.

== Content ==
"The Edge of Heaven", "Battlestations", "Wham! Rap '86" and "Where Did Your Heart Go?", according to the liner notes, are newly recorded for the album, with "The Edge of Heaven", "Battlestations" and "Where Did Your Heart Go?" also appearing on The Final; the other half was slightly changed for the collection, with the exception of the Pudding mix of "Last Christmas":

- The version of "A Different Corner" featured has an intro that does not appear elsewhere, aside from the song's music video.
- The version of "I'm Your Man" is slightly edited down from the Extended Stimulation mix and features a newly recorded spoken bridge.
- This marks the only appearance of "Blue (live in China)" on CD.

Decades later, Music from the Edge of Heaven was not included in the CD remastering series by the duo's record company because of the album's limited release; however, The Final was included. A box set of the three studio albums by the band titled Original Album Classics was released on 20 March 2015, which included Music from the Edge of Heaven.

Although it did not have a physical release in forms such as vinyl or CD in Europe, Music from the Edge of Heaven was released in Europe on the iTunes Store for the first time to download in late 2017.

== Track listing ==
All tracks are written by George Michael, except where noted.

Hot Side
No.	Title	Writer(s)	Length
1.	"The Edge of Heaven"		4:31
2.	"Battlestations"		5:25
3.	"I'm Your Man"		6:05
4.	"Wham! Rap '86"	Michael; Andrew Ridgeley	6:33

Cool Side
No.	Title	Writer(s)	Length
5.	"A Different Corner"		4:30
6.	"Blue" (live in China; recorded at the Workers' Gymnasium, Beijing)		5:43
7.	"Where Did Your Heart Go?" (Was (Not Was) cover)	Don Was; Dave Was	5:43
8.	"Last Christmas" (Pudding mix)		6:44
Total length:			45:14

== Personnel ==
- George Michael – vocals, keyboards, piano, drum machine, arranger, producer
- Andrew Ridgeley – backing vocals, guitar
- Danny Cummings – drums, percussion
- Andy Duncan – drums, percussion
- Charlie Morgan – drums, percussion
- Trevor Murrell – drums, percussion
- Deon Estus – bass
- John McKenzie – bass
- Bob Carter – keyboards, piano
- Richard Cottle – keyboards, piano
- Tommy Eyre – keyboards, piano
- Elton John – keyboards, piano
- Danny Schogger – keyboards, piano
- Robert Ahwai – guitar
- David Austin – guitar
- Hugh Burns – guitar
- David Baptiste – alto saxophone
- Andy Hamilton – tenor saxophone (2, 7)
- Guy Barker – horns
- Simon Gardner – horns
- Chris Hunter – horns
- Paul Spong – horns
- Rick Taylor – horns
- Shirlie Holliman – backing vocals
- Helen "Pepsi" DeMacque – backing vocals
- Janet Mooney – backing vocals
- Leroy Osbourne – backing vocals
- Jenny Hallet – backing vocals
- Dee C. Lee – backing vocals

Technical

- Chris Porter – engineer, mixing

== Charts ==
=== Weekly charts ===
Weekly chart performance for Music from the Edge of Heaven
Chart (1986)	Peak position
Canada Top Albums/CDs (RPM)	9
Japanese Albums (Oricon)	9
US Billboard 200	10

=== Year-end charts ===
Year-end chart performance for Music from the Edge of Heaven
Chart (1986)	Position
Canada Top Albums/CDs (RPM)	46

== Certifications and sales ==
Certifications and sales for Music from the Edge of Heaven
Region	Certification	Certified units/sales
Canada (Music Canada)	Platinum	100,000^{^}
Japan (Oricon Charts)	—	158,000
Poland (ZPAV)	Platinum	30,000^{‡}
United States (RIAA)	Platinum	1,000,000^{^}
^{^} Shipments figures based on certification alone.^{‡} Sales+streaming figures based on certification alone.
