= Wham! =

English pop duo (1981–1986)

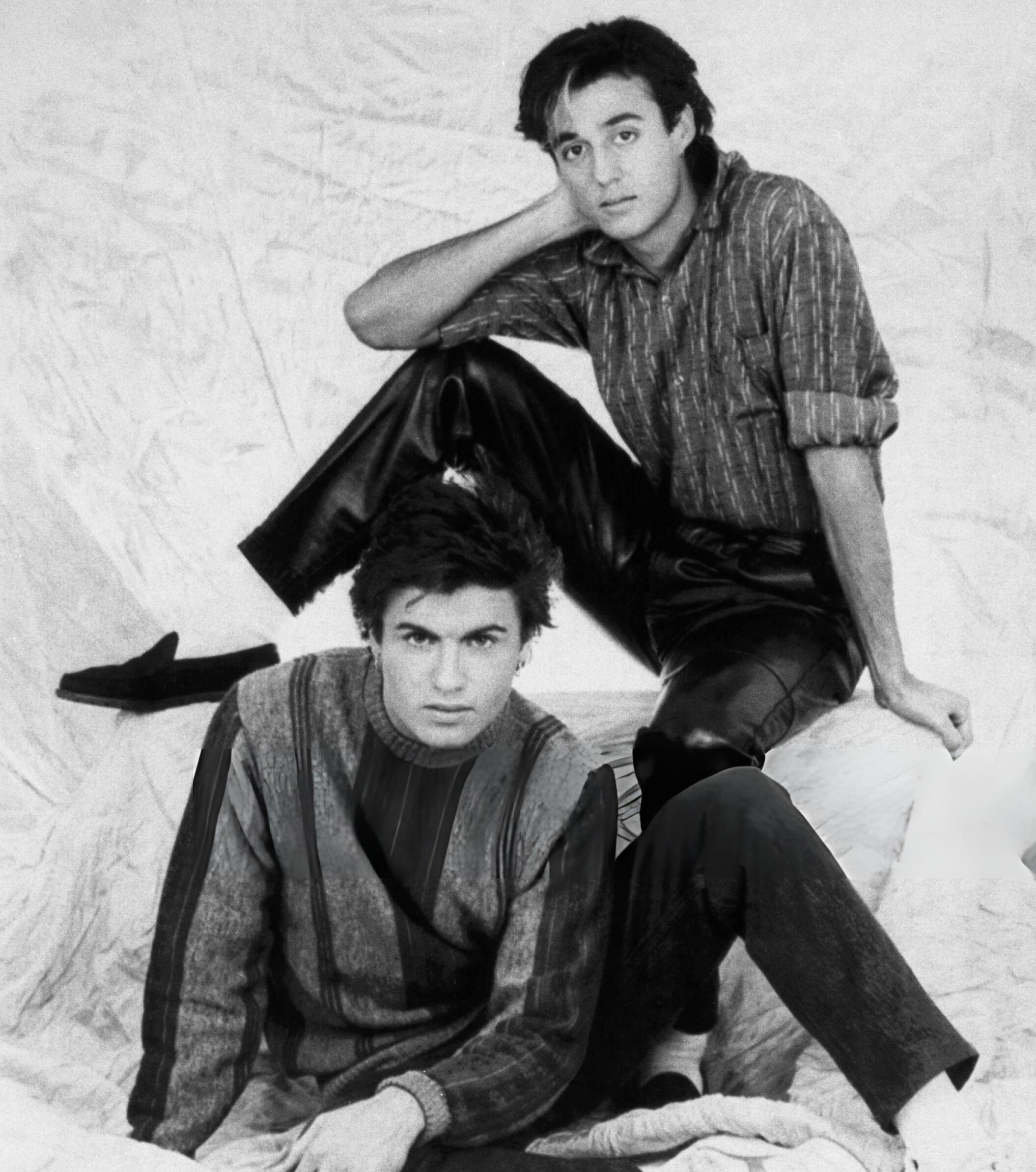
- Wham! in 1984. Top to bottom: Andrew Ridgeley and George Michael

Background information
- Origin: Bushey, Hertfordshire, England, United Kingdom
- Genres: Pop; dance-pop; post-disco
- Works: Wham! discography
- Years active: 1981–1986
- Labels: Columbia; Innervision; Epic; Sony
- Past members: George Michael; Andrew Ridgeley
- Website: wham.world

Wham! were an English pop duo formed in Bushey in 1981 consisting of George Michael and Andrew Ridgeley. They were one of the most successful pop acts during the 1980s, selling more than 30 million certified records worldwide from 1982 to 1986. Associated with the MTV-driven Second British Invasion of the US, the singles "Wake Me Up Before You Go-Go", "Careless Whisper", and "Everything She Wants" all topped the US Billboard Hot 100. Their 1984 Christmas track "Last Christmas" has become a staple of the holiday season since its release, with all proceeds from the single going to charity.

Influenced by funk and soul music and presenting themselves as disaffected youth, Wham!'s 1983 debut album, Fantastic, addressed the United Kingdom's unemployment problem and teen angst over adulthood. Their second studio album, Make It Big, in 1984 was a worldwide success, charting at number one in both the UK and the United States. In 1985, Wham! made a highly publicised ten-day visit to China, the first by a Western pop group. The event was seen as a major watershed moment in increasing friendly bilateral relations between China and the West.

In 1986, Wham! disbanded. Michael was keen to create music targeted at a more adult market rather than the duo's primarily teenage audience. Before going their separate ways, they released a farewell single, "The Edge of Heaven", and a greatest-hits album titled The Final, along with a farewell concert entitled the Final.

== History ==
=== 1975–1981: Formation ===
In 1975, Michael and Ridgeley met at Bushey Meads School in Bushey near the town of Watford in Hertfordshire. The two at first performed in a short-lived ska band called the Executive, alongside former school friends David Mortimer (later known as David Austin), Andrew Leaver, Tony Bywaters, Jamie Gould and Paul Ridgeley. The band were spotted by talent scout Michael Burdett, who had been working for the publishing company Sparta Florida Music Group. Having heard rehearsal tapes, Sparta Florida passed on the band. Burdett booked the band into a recording studio near St Albans, Hertfordshire to record their first demo tape, which featured "Rude Boy"—the first Michael–Ridgeley composition—as well as a ska rendition of "Für Elise".

When the Executive split, Michael and Ridgeley eventually formed Wham!. Ridgeley explained that the name originated from a need for "something that captured the essence of what set us apart—our energy and our friendship—and then it came to us: Wham! Wham! was snappy, immediate, fun and boisterous too." British graphic design studio Stylorouge was credited with adding the exclamation mark to the name of the band.

=== 1982–1983: Signing with Innervision and Fantastic ===
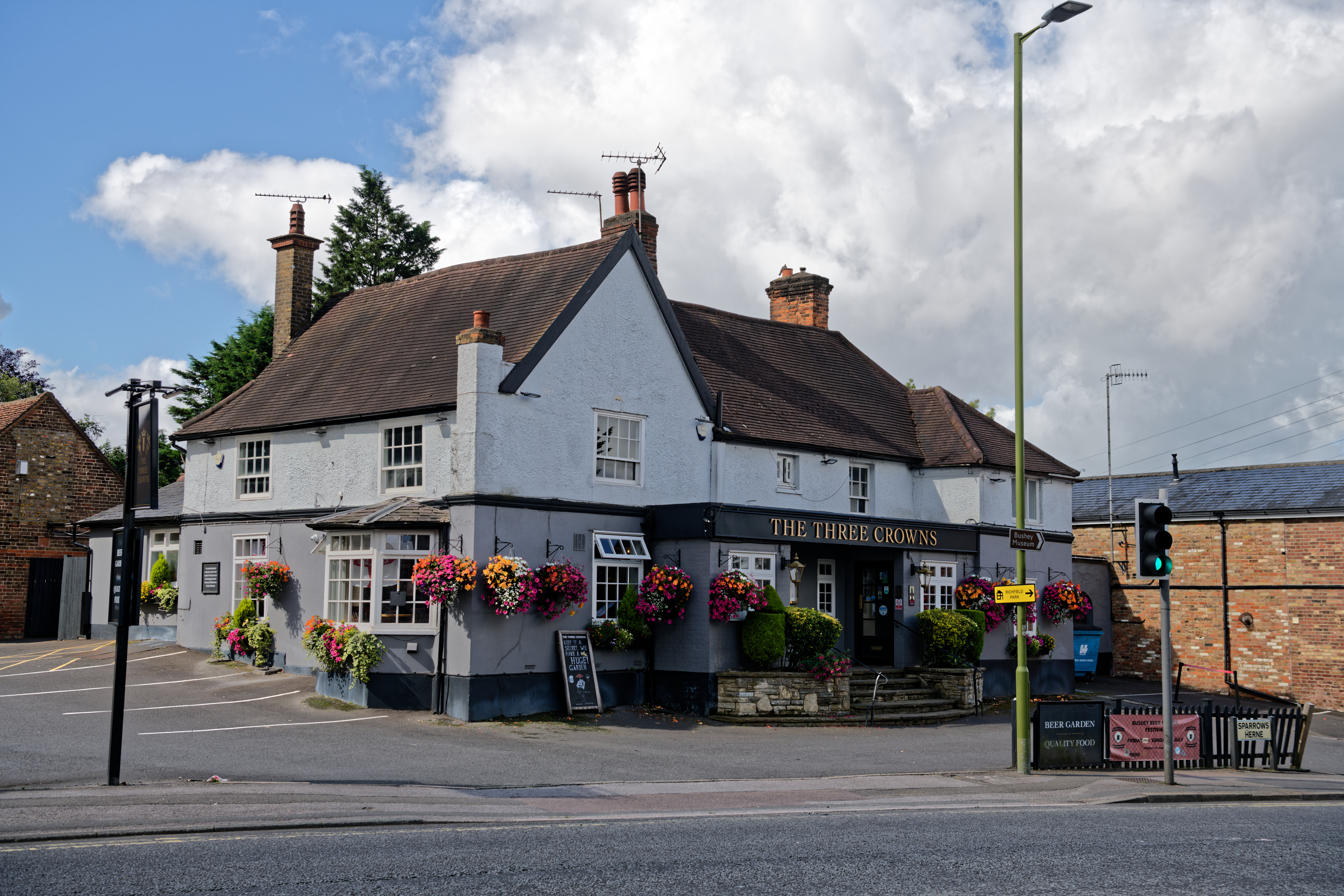
A meeting between Ridgeley and Mark Dean at the Three Crowns Public House (pictured) in Bushey Heath led to Wham! signing a recording deal with Innervision Records.

Ridgeley and Michael worked persistently to get a foot in the door with recording executives. Ridgeley would frequently run into Mark Dean from Innervision Records at the Three Crowns Public House in Bushey Heath, Hertfordshire, and ask about the group's demo tape he had given him. In February 1982, Dean met with Michael and Ridgeley and offered them a recording deal. "I'm going to offer Wham! a deal with my new label Innervision," Dean said. "It's not a huge thing, I'm taking a punt. I'd like you to have a crack at recording a single or two and we'll see what happens from there."

Initially the pair wrote songs such as "Wham Rap! (Enjoy What You Do)", "Club Tropicana" and "Careless Whisper" together, but partway through the recording of their debut album, Fantastic, the pair agreed that Michael was the stronger songwriter, and would take creative control. Still teenagers, they promoted themselves as hedonistic youngsters, proud to live a carefree life without work or commitment. This was reflected in their earliest singles which, part-parody, part-social comment, briefly earned Wham! a reputation as a dance protest group. The debut record to be released by the group was "Wham Rap!" in May 1982. The song charted at only No. 105. In September 1982, "Young Guns (Go for It)" was issued. Initially, it also stalled outside the UK Top 40, but the group got lucky when the BBC programme Top of the Pops scheduled them after another act unexpectedly pulled out of the show.

Wham!'s first manager was Bryan Morrison. The effect of Wham! on the public was felt from the moment they finished their debut performance of "Young Guns (Go for It)" on Top of the Pops. Michael and Ridgeley wore white espadrilles sockless, an open suede jacket and polo shirt, and rolled-up denim jeans. Ridgeley stood behind him, flanked by backing singers Dee C. Lee and Shirlie Holliman. Afterwards, the song shot into the Top 40 at No. 24 and peaked at No. 3 in December. The following year, Lee began her work with Paul Weller in the Style Council, and was replaced by Helen 'Pepsi' DeMacque. Holliman and DeMacque would later record as Pepsi & Shirlie. Wham! followed up "Young Guns (Go for It)" with a reissue of "Wham Rap! (Enjoy What You Do)" and the singles "Bad Boys" and "Club Tropicana". By the end of 1983, Wham! were competing against pop rivals Culture Club and Duran Duran as one of Britain's biggest pop acts. Their debut album, Fantastic, spent two weeks at No. 1 in the UK album charts in 1983, but achieved only modest success in the US.

=== 1983–1984: Legal disputes with Innervision, switch to Epic and Make It Big ===
Soon after this, Michael and Ridgeley became conscious of legal problems with their initial contract at Innervision. While the legal battle raged, Innervision released a medley of non-single album tracks from Fantastic, entitled "Club Fantastic Megamix". Wham! publicly denounced the release. After all the legal wrangling, Innervision settled out of court.

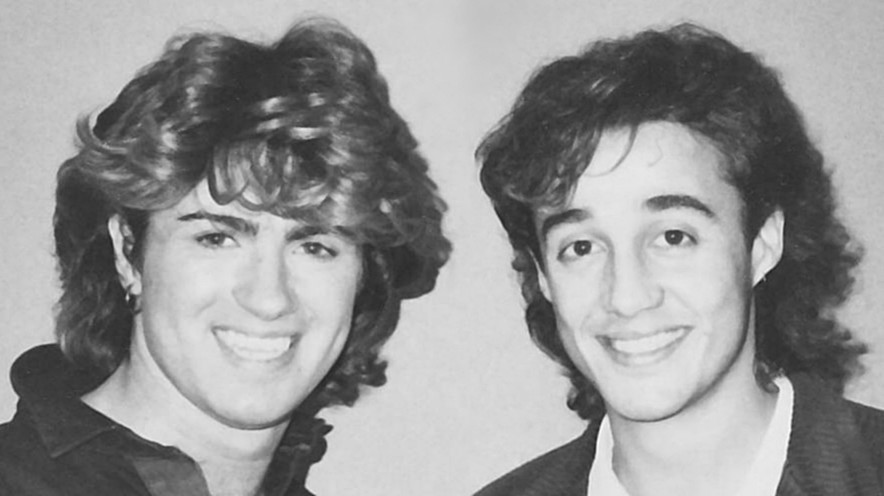
Michael (left) and Ridgeley (right), c. 1984–1985

After the settlement, Innervision's distributor, CBS Records, took over Wham!'s contract, placing them on the Columbia label in the US and on Epic worldwide. "Wake Me Up Before You Go-Go", the first single released under the new deal, propelled Wham! into the top ten of several countries around the world. It became their first US and UK No. 1 single, and was accompanied by a music video featuring the duo with DeMacque and Holliman, all wearing Katharine Hamnett-designed T-shirts with the slogans "CHOOSE LIFE" and "GO GO".

During the summer of 1984, Wham! settled in France to record their second studio album, Make It Big. In July, the single "Careless Whisper" was released. Although it would appear on Make It Big, the song was marketed as Michael's debut solo single in most territories except in the US, where it was credited to "Wham! featuring George Michael". A ballad, "Careless Whisper" reached No. 1, selling over 1.3 million copies in the UK. The next single, "Freedom", became the group's second UK No. 1 hit. Released at the end of October in the US and in early November in the UK, Make It Big climbed to No. 1 on the album charts in countries worldwide. In support of the album, Wham! set off on an arena tour, the Big Tour, at the end of 1984.

The double A-side single "Last Christmas" / "Everything She Wants" was the highest-selling single ever to peak at No. 2 in the UK charts. It stayed at No. 2 for five weeks when it was released in 1984. However, in January 2021, it was announced that Last Christmas had got to No. 1 after being streamed 9.2 million times in a week, setting a record for the longest time taken for a single to peak at No. 1. It also got to No. 1 in December 2022. As of March 2023, it was the 9th best-selling single of all time. It became the Christmas No. 1 in 2023 and 2024, and returned to No. 1 in December 2025. Wham! donated all their royalties from the single to the Ethiopian famine appeal to coincide with the fund-raising intentions of Band Aid's "Do They Know It's Christmas?", the song which kept them out of the top spot. Nevertheless, Band Aid's success meant that Michael had achieved No. 1 status in the UK within three separate entities in 1984—as a solo artist, as one half of a duo, and as part of a charity ensemble. At the end of 1985, the US Billboard charts listed "Wake Me Up Before You Go-Go" as the No. 3 song and "Careless Whisper" as the No. 1 song of the year.

=== 1985: Visit to China and Live Aid ===
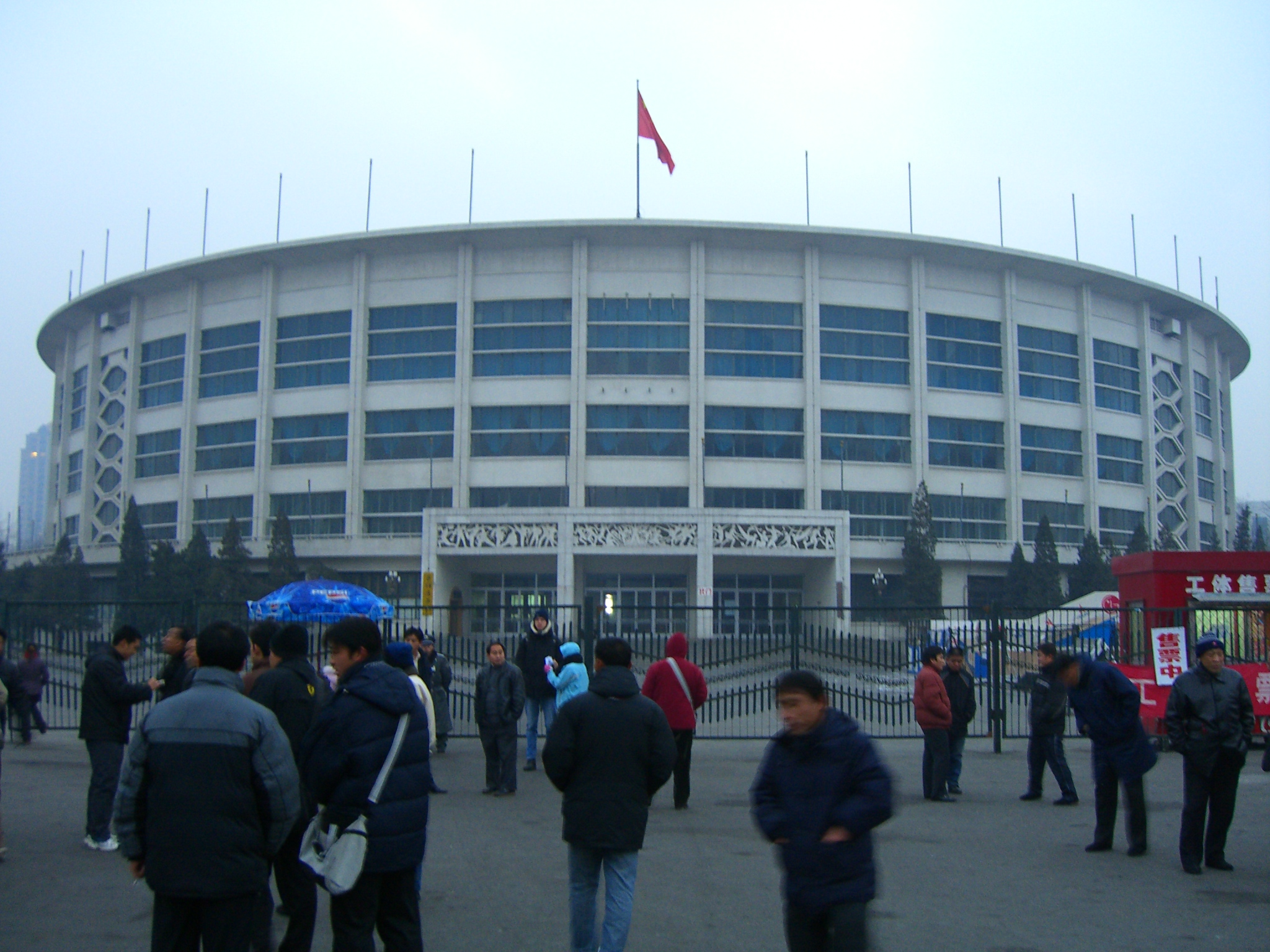
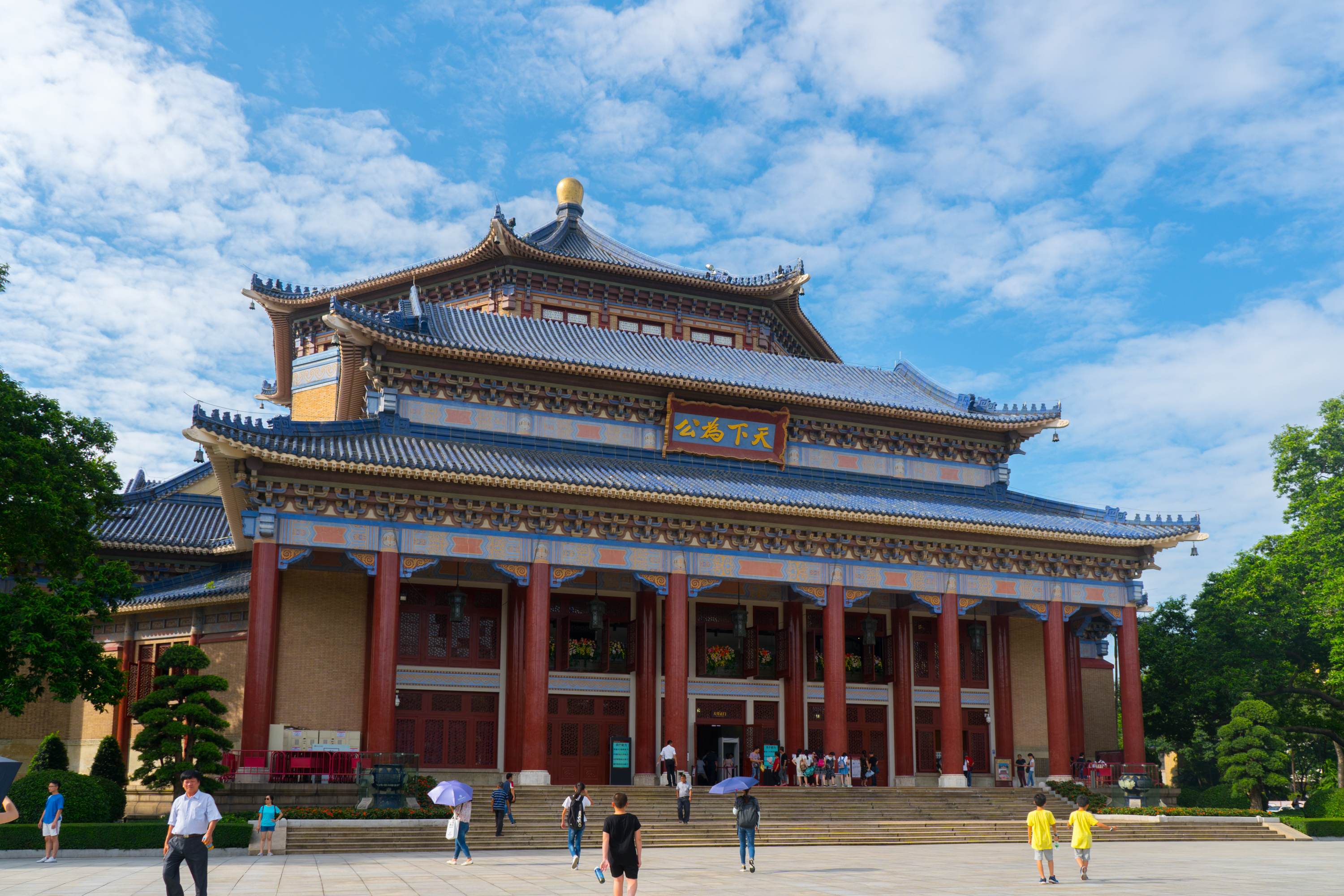
As part of their visit to China, Wham! performed at Beijing's Workers' Gymnasium (top) and Canton's Sun Yat-sen Memorial Hall (bottom).

In April 1985, Wham! undertook a groundbreaking 10-day visit to China, the first by a Western pop group, as part of their Big Tour. The China excursion was a publicity scheme devised by Simon Napier-Bell (one of their two managers; Jazz Summers being the other). It began with a concert at the Workers' Gymnasium in Beijing in front of 12,000 people. They also played a concert in front of 5,000 in Canton. The two concerts were played without compensation. Wham!'s visit to China attracted huge media attention across the world. Napier-Bell later admitted that he used cunning tactics to sabotage the efforts of rock band Queen to be the first to play in China: he made two brochures for the Chinese authorities; one featuring Wham! fans as pleasant middle-class youngsters and one portraying Queen lead singer Freddie Mercury in typically flamboyant poses. The Chinese opted for Wham!.

British director Lindsay Anderson was engaged to accompany Wham! to China and make a documentary film about the visit. Anderson called his one-hour and 18 minute film If You Were There. In the final stages of editing, Anderson was dismissed by Wham!'s management, the editing team quit, and the film was re-edited, renamed and released as Wham! in China: Foreign Skies. According to a 2006 interview with The Independent, Andy Stephens, manager for Michael, said that the film [Anderson's version] was simply not good enough to be shown in public: "It's a dreadful film ... It's 20 years old and it's rubbish. Why on earth should we allow it to be shown?" However, after viewing it in 2008, critic and journalist John Harris described it as "a rich, poetic, panoramic portrait of China's strangeness to the eyes of outsiders".

Sporting a beard, Michael appeared with Ridgeley onstage at Live Aid on 13 July 1985, although they did not perform as Wham!. Michael sang "Don't Let the Sun Go Down on Me" with Elton John, while Ridgeley joined Kiki Dee in the row of backing singers. In August, Wham! embarked on the Whamamerica! tour, which consisted of nine shows across the United States and Canada. In November, Wham! released the single "I'm Your Man", which reached No. 1 on the UK singles chart, and became the group's third UK No. 1 hit.

Around this time, Ridgeley took up the hobby of rally driving. "Last Christmas" was re-issued for the festive season and again made the UK Top 10, peaking at No. 6, while Michael took up offers he was starting to receive to add his voice to other artists' songs. He performed backing vocals for David Cassidy ("The Last Kiss"), and also for Elton John on his successful singles "Nikita" (UK No. 3) and "Wrap Her Up" (UK No. 12), on which he sang co-lead vocals.

=== 1986: The Final, farewell concert and break-up ===
By the end of 1985, Michael had grown weary of his public image, and was keen to create music targeted at a more adult market rather than the duo's primarily teenage audience. According to Michael in Wham!'s final interview conducted by No. 1 magazine in June 1986, he and Ridgeley decided to split the group at the height of its success "about a year and a half back". Said Michael, "Part of the whole plan was to do something that no one ever does—which is to go out when you really are on top." Intense media scrutiny on Michael also played a role in the break-up.

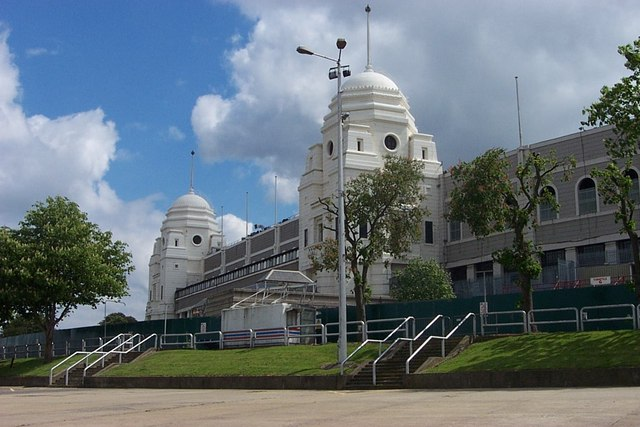
The original Wembley Stadium (pictured in 2002) in London was the venue for Wham!'s farewell concert, the Final, which attracted 72,000 fans.

Michael officially announced the break-up of Wham! during an episode of the chat show Aspel & Company on 1 March 1986. He said that the group would record and release a farewell single, and would perform a farewell concert entitled the Final. Regarding the break-up, Michael stated: "I think it should be the most amicable split in pop history."

The farewell single, "The Edge of Heaven", was released on 9 June, and became Wham!'s fourth and final UK No. 1 hit. The black-and-white music video for the song shows Michael and Ridgeley during a performance in front of a crowd, with scenes from the group's earlier music videos being shown on projection screens and interspersed within the video itself. In the US, "Where Did Your Heart Go?" (a cover of a Was (Not Was) song) was issued as the group's final single later in the year.

Preceded by two warm-up concerts at the Brixton Academy, Wham! performed their farewell concert at London's Wembley Stadium on 28 June 1986. 72,000 people attended the event, which included support artists and guests, such as Elton John and Simon Le Bon. Foreign Skies, the documentary of the group's visit to China, received its world premiere as part of the festivities. On 7 July, the greatest hits album The Final was released, reaching No. 2 in the UK. In North America and Japan, newly-recorded tracks from The Final were compiled onto an album entitled Music from the Edge of Heaven, which essentially served as Wham!'s third and final studio album.

== Legacy ==
During Michael's performance at the Stand by Me AIDS Day Benefit concert at London's Wembley Arena on 1 April 1987, he was briefly joined by Ridgeley on stage to perform "Everything She Wants". On 25 June 1988, Michael's 25th birthday, Ridgeley joined him for a performance of "I'm Your Man" during a concert at the NEC Arena in Birmingham as part of Michael's solo world tour, the Faith Tour. On 27 January 1991, Ridgeley joined Michael on stage for a few songs at the encore of his performance at the Rock in Rio II event at the Maracanã Stadium in Rio de Janeiro, Brazil.

In November 1997, Epic Records issued a greatest hits album entitled The Best of Wham!: If You Were There... On 21 November 2009, a Wham!-themed episode aired on The X Factor in the UK. Michael later appeared on the show's final episode, performing a duet of "Don't Let the Sun Go Down on Me" with finalist and eventual winner Joe McElderry.

In 2012, Michael said that there was no truth in speculation that he and Ridgeley were set for a Wham! reunion to mark the 30th anniversary of the group's first album.

Michael died from heart and liver disease at his home in Goring-on-Thames, Oxfordshire on Christmas Day 2016, at the age of 53. Upon hearing of Michael's death, Ridgeley paid his respects on Twitter, saying, "Heartbroken at the loss of my beloved friend Yog." Michael was posthumously inducted into the Rock and Roll Hall of Fame as a solo artist in November 2023, with Ridgeley as the induction presenter.

On 17 June 2023, the documentary film Wham! had its world premiere at the Sheffield DocFest. Directed by Chris Smith, the film relies primarily on rare archive footage and audio interviews by the duo, and received generally positive reviews from critics. On 7 July 2023, the compilation album The Singles: Echoes from the Edge of Heaven was released by Sony Music. The compilation collects all of the group's UK singles and was issued in multiple formats, including a singles box set.

In March 2026, it was announced that a documentary film focused on Wham!'s 1985 visit to China was being produced by Supercollider. The film, Wham! 10 Days in China, premiered in cinemas worldwide on 28 July 2026. An accompanying EP featuring four live tracks recorded during the China performances is scheduled for release on 4 December 2026.

== Discography ==
- Fantastic (1983)
- Make It Big (1984)
- Music from the Edge of Heaven (1986)

== Filmography ==
- Wham! in China: Foreign Skies (1986)
- Wham! (2023)
- Wham!: Last Christmas Unwrapped (2024)
- Wham! 10 Days in China (2026)

== Tours or shows ==
- Club Fantastic Tour (1983)
- The Big Tour (1984–1985)
- Whamamerica! (1985)
- The Final (1986)
