= I'm Your Man (Wham! song) =

1985 single by Wham!

- UK 7-inch and 12-inch vinyl picture sleeve (also used for most international releases)

Single by Wham!

from the album Music from the Edge of Heaven and The Final
- B-side: "Do It Right"
- Released: 11 November 1985
- Recorded: 1985
- Genre: Dance-pop; soul; new wave
- Length: 6:10 (album version); 4:05 (7" single version); 6:53 (12" single version)
- Label: Epic; Columbia
- Songwriter: George Michael
- Producer: George Michael

Wham! singles chronology
"Last Christmas" / "Everything She Wants" (1984)	"I'm Your Man" (1985)	"The Edge of Heaven" (1986)

Music video
- "I'm Your Man" on YouTube

"I'm Your Man" is a song by the English pop duo Wham!, released on 11 November 1985, via Epic Records in the United Kingdom and most of the world, and Columbia Records in the United States. It was written and produced by George Michael. It was released a single for the albums Music from the Edge of Heaven, released in North America and Japan, and The Final, released in Australasia and Europe.

== Background ==
"I'm Your Man", according to Michael, was "pretty different to anything [Wham! has] ever done". According to Michael:

"'I'm Your Man' was written very quickly. The whole of the first verse and chorus came to me in five minutes on an internal flight in America [during the Whamamerica! tour].

Within six months of the release of "I'm Your Man", Wham! had announced their split. They had a fourth and final number one and released a farewell album, prior to a concert at Wembley Stadium, at which "I'm Your Man" was the last song Michael performed with partner Andrew Ridgeley.

Along with "Everything She Wants", "I'm Your Man" would subsequently be one of the few Wham! songs which Michael continued to perform regularly through the duration of his solo career.

== Chart performance ==
"I'm Your Man" became Wham!'s third number one on the UK Singles Chart, but did not feature on a studio album, and was essentially an isolated single which was only followed up by a re-issue of the previous year's Christmas hit, "Last Christmas".

The song also reached number three on the US Billboard Hot 100, prevented from further chart movement by Rocky IV soundtrack single "Burning Heart" by Survivor and "That's What Friends Are For" by Dionne and Friends.

== Other releases ==
An extended mix of the song was released on Wham!'s 1986 album The Final. It also featured on the US version of the album Music from the Edge of Heaven.

In 1996, Michael recorded a solo version of Lisa Moorish's 1995 version of "I'm Your Man" on which Michael provided vocals. Michael's solo version appeared as a B-side on the "Fastlove" CD single (also being sampled into an extended mix of "Fastlove") and, credited to Wham!, on The Best of Wham!: If You Were There....

In 2012, comedian John Bishop mimed and danced to the song along with a "Mini Me" version of himself at the end of his tour DVD Rollercoaster.

== Critical reception ==
Cash Box said that it "continues to show the group’s indebtedness to Motown grooves and girl group vocal arrangements." Billboard agreed that it has Motown influence and is "handled with affection and accuracy."

== Music video ==
The official music video for the song was directed by Andy Morahan. The video is presented in black and white, set in the Marquee Club, Wardour Street, London, where Wham! are performing the song. An extended intro and outro features Michael and Ridgeley trying without success to sell tickets to passersby. Michael makes a phone call to his agent Simon Napier-Bell, complaining about having to sing at the Marquee. He is heard saying "Simon, don't cry" and finally hangs up on him with the words "we got a gig to play, goodbye". During the video, film countdown numbers flash up at times, making the numbers 69 and 66. It also shows "SEX" in the countdown.

== Track listings ==
All tracks are written by George Michael.

7-inch: Epic / A 6716 (UK)
No.	Title	Length
1.	"I'm Your Man"	4:05
2.	"Do It Right"	4:05

12-inch: Epic / TA 6716 (UK)
No.	Title	Length
1.	"I'm Your Man" (extended stimulation)	6:53
2.	"Do It Right"	4:05
3.	"I'm Your Man" (a cappella)	4:17

- Also released as a picture disc (WTA 6716) and cassette (TA40 6716)
- "Do It Right" is the instrumental version of "I'm Your Man"

== Charts ==
=== Weekly charts ===
Weekly chart performance for "I'm Your Man"
Chart (1985–1986)	Peak position
Australia (Kent Music Report)	3
Austria (Ö3 Austria Top 40)	14
Belgium (Ultratop 50 Flanders)	3
Canada Retail Singles (The Record)	6
Canada Top Singles (RPM)	7
Denmark (IFPI)	1
Europe (European Hot 100 Singles)	2
Finland (Suomen virallinen lista)	2
France (SNEP)	34
Iceland (RÚV)	2
Ireland (IRMA)	1
Italy (Musica e dischi)	1
Netherlands (Dutch Top 40)	4
Netherlands (Single Top 100)	3
New Zealand (Recorded Music NZ)	1
Norway (VG-lista)	4
South Africa (Springbok)	13
Sweden (Sverigetopplistan)	15
Switzerland (Schweizer Hitparade)	7
UK Singles (Official Charts)	1
US Billboard Hot 100	3
US Adult Contemporary (Billboard)	13
US Dance Club Songs (Billboard)	42
US Hot R&B/Hip-Hop Songs (Billboard)	55
US Hot Dance Music/Maxi-Singles Sales	22
US Cash Box Top 100	3
US Adult Contemporary (Radio & Records)	10
US Black/Urban (Radio & Records)	38
US Contemporary Hit Radio (Radio & Records)	3
West Germany (GfK)	7

=== Year-end charts ===
Year-end chart performance for "I'm Your Man"
Chart (1985)	Position
UK Singles (OCC)	23

Chart (1986)	Position
Australia (Kent Music Report)	32
Canada Top Singles (RPM)	65
New Zealand (RIANZ)	10
US Billboard Hot 100	63
US Cash Box Top 100	41
US A/C Full-Service (Radio & Records)	81
US Adult Contemporary (Radio & Records)	79
US Contemporary Hit Radio (Radio & Records)	50

== Certifications ==
Certifications for "I'm Your Man"
Region	Certification	Certified units/sales
Canada (Music Canada)	Gold	50,000^{^}
New Zealand (RMNZ)	Gold	15,000^{‡}
United Kingdom (BPI)	Gold	608,287
^{^} Shipments figures based on certification alone.^{‡} Sales+streaming figures based on certification alone.

== Lisa Moorish version ==
"I'm Your Man"

Single by Lisa Moorish

from the album I've Gotta Have It All
- Released: 31 July 1995
- Studio: Sarm West (London)
- Genre: Dance
- Length: 3:48
- Label: Go! Discs
- Songwriter: George Michael
- Producer: Jon Douglas

Lisa Moorish singles chronology
"Just the Way It Is" (1994)	"I'm Your Man" (1995)	"Mr. Friday Night" (1996)

In 1995, English singer-songwriter Lisa Moorish covered "I'm Your Man" for her debut album, I've Gotta Have It All (1996), with Michael providing background vocals. Just like "Mr. Friday Night", the cover was also a moderate success on the UK charts. According to the story of this recording, Moorish was in a UK studio working on the track with the producer, Jon Douglas. On the same day Michael was in the building, walking down the hall and heard Moorish singing the song. He loved her interpretation and asked to sing backup on the track.

=== Critical reception ===
Larry Flick from Billboard magazine wrote, "Charming pop ingenue drops the pace of this Wham! chestnut down to a wriggling hip-hop smoker that is already a smash overseas. Single is bolstered by an uncredited vocal by George Michael, though Moorish has a vampish style that would have easily drawn the ardent attention of top 40 programmers on her own. Hard to imagine this one not riding a fast and furious wave to the top regions of the Hot 100 within seconds." In a separate review, Flick explained, "The final product is a deliciously seductive jeep/hip-hop version of the song that is bound for multiformat success similar to its run abroad. Newcomer Moorish makes an excellent first vocal impression here, revealing a low-register, feline style—though we are still wondering why she chose to sing a male-specific lyric in the first place. Michael's long-absent distinctive belting is a welcome treat, as is the track's perfectly measured fuzz-guitar lines, muscular bassline, and hard-edged beats." Jordan Paramor from Smash Hits gave Moorish' version of the song four out of five, writing, "It's great! it's laid-back and funky with smooth vocals, and, joy of joys, George even sings on it!"

=== Charts ===
Weekly chart performance for "I'm Your Man"
Chart (1995)	Peak position
Europe (Eurochart Hot 100)	66
Europe (European Dance Radio)	12
Iceland (Íslenski Listinn Topp 40)	39
Israel (Israeli Singles Chart)	23
Netherlands (Dutch Top 40 Tipparade)	16
Netherlands (Single Top 100)	49
Quebec (ADISQ)	34
Scotland (OCC)	29
UK Singles (Official Charts)	24
UK Dance (OCC)	7
UK Airplay (Music Week)	32
UK Club Chart (Music Week)	6
UK Pop Tip Club Chart (Music Week)	25

== Shane Richie version ==
"I'm Your Man"

Single by Shane Richie
- Released: 24 November 2003
- Length: 3:37
- Label: BMG
- Songwriter: George Michael
- Producer: Absolute

In 2003, actor and EastEnders star Shane Richie covered "I'm Your Man" as a fundraising single for the BBC charity Children in Need. Produced by Absolute, Richie's version of the song reached number two on the UK Singles Chart.

=== Track listing ===
- UK CD single
1. "I'm Your Man" – 3:37
2. "I'm Your Man" (Shanghai Surprize's East End pop mix) – 6:37
3. "I'm Your Man" (video) – 3:37
4. "The Making of the Video" – 1:59
- UK DVD single
1. "I'm Your Man" (video)
2. "I'm Your Man" (karaoke)
3. "The Making of the Video"

=== Charts ===
==== Weekly charts ====
Weekly chart performance for "I'm Your Man"
Chart (2003)	Peak position
Europe (Eurochart Hot 100)	11
Ireland (IRMA)	10
Scottish Singles Sales (Official Charts)	2
UK Singles (Official Charts)	2

==== Year-end charts ====
Year-end chart performance for "I'm Your Man"
Chart (2003)	Position
Ireland (IRMA)	94
UK Singles (OCC)	17

=== Certifications ===
Certifications and sales for "I'm Your Man"
Region	Certification	Certified units/sales
United Kingdom (BPI)	Silver	200,000^{^}
^{^} Shipments figures based on certification alone.
