= A Different Corner =

Single by George Michael

from the album Music from the Edge of Heaven and The Final
- B-side: "A Different Corner" (instrumental)
- Released: 24 March 1986
- Recorded: Autumn 1985
- Genre: Pop
- Length: 4:32 (LP version); 3:57 (single edit); 4:13 (instrumental)
- Label: Epic; Columbia
- Songwriter: George Michael
- Producer: George Michael

George Michael singles chronology
"Careless Whisper" (1984)	"A Different Corner" (1986)	"I Knew You Were Waiting (For Me)" (1987)

Music video
- "A Different Corner" on YouTube

"A Different Corner" is a song written and performed by English singer and songwriter George Michael, released on 24 March 1986 by Epic Records in the UK and Columbia Records in the US. It was Michael's second solo single release following "Careless Whisper" (1984), and reached number one on the UK singles chart.

== Background and writing ==
"A Different Corner" was written by Michael while Wham! were at their peak as a duo, and during a low point in his life.

Michael said that "A Different Corner" was the "most honest" and personal song he had ever written. He elaborated further on the song's meaning:

That was about a very quick relationship, a here today gone tomorrow one. It's amazing how emotional you can get in a short period of time and how long it can last. Someone can really shake you up and it takes you a long time to get yourself back on your feet; that was what that was about.

According to Michael, the song took roughly 14 hours to write and record from beginning to end. The synthesizer textures were created with a Roland Juno-60 synthesizer.

== Release ==
At the time of its release in March 1986, Michael was still a member of pop duo Wham! (the song is included on Wham!'s album Music from the Edge of Heaven, only released in Japan and North America, as well as their compilation album The Final, released worldwide), although he and partner Andrew Ridgeley had announced that they would split in the summer after a farewell single, album and concert. Michael had already enjoyed a solo number one on the UK singles chart in 1984 with "Careless Whisper", which was credited to "Wham! featuring George Michael" in the US.

After radio DJ Simon Bates first aired "A Different Corner" on Radio 1, he rated the song so highly that he immediately played it again from the beginning. Michael went back to the top of the UK chart with "A Different Corner", becoming the first solo act in the history of the UK chart to reach number one with his first two releases, although he was hardly an unknown or new act on either occasion due to his previous success with Wham!. The song reached number 7 on the US Billboard Hot 100, thus becoming the first single credited solely to Michael to become an American top-ten hit which was enough to make American executives at Epic Records confident that Michael would be viable as a solo artist and helped get the gears in motion for his solo album debut Faith. It was the first song to reach number one in the UK charts to be written, performed and produced by the same person.

The song was also remixed for his compilation Ladies & Gentlemen: The Best of George Michael. This version omitted the guitar and Michael's background vocals during the instrumental break.

== Cover versions ==
In 2017, Chris Martin, lead singer of British rock band Coldplay, performed the song as a tribute to Michael at the year's Brit Awards ceremony.

In 2026, South African multimedia artist Nakhane released a version of the song.

== Music video ==
The music video for "A Different Corner" was directed by Andy Morahan and filmed in Los Angeles. It is set in a sparse white room with a window. Michael is also dressed in white, and is shown sitting and walking around the room whilst singing the song.

The video features cinematography from David Watkin, who won the Best Lighting Director award for his involvement with the video at 1986's Billboard Top Video Honors.

== Track listings ==
All tracks are written by George Michael.

7″: Epic / A 7033 (UK)
No.	Title	Length
1.	"A Different Corner"	3:57
2.	"A Different Corner" (instrumental)	4:13

12″: Epic / GTA 7033 (UK)
No.	Title	Length
1.	"A Different Corner"	3:57
2.	"A Different Corner" (instrumental)	4:13

- Released in a gatefold sleeve.

== Charts ==
=== Weekly charts ===
Chart (1986)	Peak position
Australia (Kent Music Report)	4
Austria (Ö3 Austria Top 40)	6
Belgium (Ultratop 50 Flanders)	2
Canada Top Singles (RPM)	1
Canada Adult Contemporary (RPM)	2
Denmark (IFPI)	2
Europe (European Hot 100 Singles)	1
Finland (Suomen virallinen lista)	3
France (SNEP)	16
Iceland (RÚV)	7
Ireland (IRMA)	2
Japan (Oricon)	78
Netherlands (Dutch Top 40)	1
Netherlands (Single Top 100)	2
New Zealand (Recorded Music NZ)	3
Norway (VG-lista)	1
Portugal (AFP)	1
South Africa (Springbok Radio)	1
Spain Radio (AFYVE)	28
Sweden (Sverigetopplistan)	18
Switzerland (Schweizer Hitparade)	3
UK Singles (Official Charts)	1
US Billboard Hot 100	7
US Adult Contemporary (Billboard)	6
West Germany (GfK)	7
Zimbabwe (ZIMA)	1

=== Year-end charts ===
Chart (1986)	Position
Australia (Kent Music Report)	58
Belgium (Ultratop)	8
Canada Top Singles (RPM)	27
Europe (European Hot 100 Singles)	16
Netherlands (Dutch Top 40)	3
Netherlands (Single Top 100)	5
New Zealand (RIANZ)	49
Switzerland (Schweizer Hitparade)	20
UK Singles (OCC)	12
US Billboard Hot 100	98
US Adult Contemporary (Billboard)	48
West Germany (Media Control)	72

== Certifications ==
Region	Certification	Certified units/sales
Netherlands (NVPI)	Platinum	100,000^{^}
United Kingdom (BPI)	Gold	547,047
^{^} Shipments figures based on certification alone.
