= Girl Talk (duo) =

British girl group

- Origin: Hornchurch, England
- Genres: Pop, synth-pop, dance
- Years active: 1983–1987
- Labels: Innervision, WEA
- Past members: Karen Wright; Julie Wright; Leigh Pearce

Girl Talk were a British girl group, formed by Karen Wright and Leigh Pearce. The girls, aged 12 and 13 respectively, released their debut single, "Can the Rhythm", in 1983 on Park Records. By the next year Pearce had been replaced by Karen's sister, Julie Wright. In March 1984, the duo took part in the Irish National Song Contest; the heat for Eurovision Song Contest, with the song "Problems". Later that year they signed to Innervision Records and released the single "Marvellous Guy" in 1984, produced by Peter Collins, but it failed to chart. Their only hit in the UK was their second Innervision single, a re-recorded "Can the Rhythm", which reached #92 in October 1984. The track was an early production of the hitmaking team Stock Aitken Waterman. "Can the Rhythm" was also released in the United States, where it was released through Geffen Records and reached #26 on the Billboard Hot Dance Club Play chart in 1985.

In 1987, the sisters moved to WEA and released two further singles, "Falling for You" (produced by the Quick) and "I Will Give You Love" (produced by John Rocca), which both failed to chart.

Unlike most of the girl groups of the era, three of their singles were written solely by a group member; in this case, by Karen Wright.

== Discography ==
=== Singles ===
- "Can the Rhythm" (1983)
- "Marvellous Guy" (1984) UK #117
- "Can the Rhythm" (new version) (1984) UK #92
- "Always Playing (The Game of Love)" (1985)
- "Falling for You" (1987)
- "I Will Give You Love" (1987)
