= Freedom (Wham! song) =

1984 single by Wham!

- UK 7-inch single and continental European release picture sleeve. The same photo was also used for the US cover of Make It Big.

Single by Wham!

from the album Make It Big
- B-side: "Freedom" (instrumental) (UK and US 12"); "Heartbeat" (US)
- Released: 1 October 1984 (UK); July 1985 (US)
- Studio: Miraval, France
- Genre: British soul; dance-pop
- Length: 5:01 (album version); 5:00 (Radio Edit); 5:10 (instrumental); 5:20 (US version); 5:08 (UK version)
- Label: CBS
- Songwriter: George Michael
- Producer: George Michael

Wham! singles chronology
"Careless Whisper" (1984)	"Freedom" (1984)	"Last Christmas" / "Everything She Wants" (1984)

Music video
- "Freedom" on YouTube

"Freedom" is a 1984 song by English pop duo Wham! from their album Make It Big, released on 1 October 1984. It became the group's second number one hit on the UK Singles Chart and reached number three in America. It was written and produced by George Michael, one half of the duo.

== History ==
Wham! had already enjoyed a successful 1984 by the time "Freedom" was released in October of the year. "Wake Me Up Before You Go-Go" had given them their first UK number one and had then reached the top of the Billboard Hot 100 in the United States. Michael had then gone to number one with a solo single, "Careless Whisper".

"Freedom" was number one in the UK for three weeks, and featured on the album Make It Big, which was issued at the same time. "Freedom" was the 10th biggest-selling single of 1984. This song also reached number 3 on the Billboard Hot 100 in the US in September 1985.

The melody of the song's chorus was used by Michael as an introduction to his song, "Faith", played on a church organ.

A reworked version of the song with altered lyrics (but still performed by the duo) was used to promote Maxell's line of audio cassettes in 1984.

When the single was released in the United States, the song was remixed and extended an extra 20 seconds. The remix involved the vocals being given more reverb and the organ sounds being higher up in the mix. The extension involved a new trumpet section and added vocals. The section had first been heard in The Big Tour to close the number.

The music video, coinciding with the 1985 US release, features the band touring around Beijing, China. Their visit to the nation was significant because they were the first Western pop band to play in China.

The American remix was later included on The Final and later, the greatest hits compilation album The Best of Wham!: If You Were There.... However, the original version was included on the US release of Make It Big.

== Critical reception ==
Cash Box said that "George Michael's R&B tinged vocals soar with the tune's catchy refrain." Billboard described the song as a "Motown tribute".

== Music Video ==
The film was shot in China, because Simon Napier-Bell wanted to increase the band's popularity by creating an unusual music video. It includes concert footage, people traveling over a bridge, footage of the countryside, and the band members walking around the Great Wall.

== Track listings ==
All tracks are written by George Michael.

7-inch: Epic / A 4743 (UK)
No.	Title	Length
1.	"Freedom"	5:08
2.	"Freedom" (instrumental)	5:10

7-inch: Columbia / 38-05409 (US)
No.	Title	Length
1.	"Freedom"	5:20
2.	"Heartbeat"	4:42

12-inch: Epic / TA 4743 (UK)
No.	Title	Length
1.	"Freedom" (long version)	7:14
2.	"Freedom" (instrumental)	5:10

- The "long version" is mislabeled as the "long mix".

12-inch maxi single: Columbia / 44-05238 (US)
No.	Title	Length
1.	"Freedom" (long mix)	6:16
2.	"Heartbeat"	4:42
3.	"Freedom" (instrumental)	5:10

== Charts ==
=== Weekly charts ===
Weekly chart performance for "Freedom"
Chart (1984–1985)	Peak position
Australia (Kent Music Report)	3
Austria (Ö3 Austria Top 40)	23
Belgium (Ultratop 50 Flanders)	2
Belgium (VRT Top 30 Flanders)	2
Canada Top Singles (RPM)	10
Canada Adult Contemporary (RPM)	3
Canada (CHUM)	5
Europe (European Hot 100 Singles)	3
Finland (Suomen virallinen lista)	5
France (SNEP)	16
Germany (GfK)	14
Iceland (RÚV)	1
Ireland (IRMA)	1
Italy (Musica e dischi)	5
Netherlands (Dutch Top 40)	2
Netherlands (Single Top 100)	3
New Zealand (Recorded Music NZ)	8
Norway (VG-lista)	1
South Africa (Springbok Radio)	8
Sweden (Sverigetopplistan)	9
Switzerland (Schweizer Hitparade)	5
UK Singles (Official Charts)	1
US Billboard Hot 100	3
US Adult Contemporary (Billboard)	4
US Cash Box Top 100	10
US Contemporary Hit Radio (Radio & Records)	6

=== Year-end charts ===
1984 year-end chart performance for "Freedom"
Chart (1984)	Position
Australia (Kent Music Report)	52
Belgium (Ultratop 50 Flanders)	19
Netherlands (Dutch Top 40)	11
Netherlands (Single Top 100)	15
UK Singles (OCC)	10

1985 year-end chart performance for "Freedom"
Chart (1985)	Position
US Billboard Hot 100	76
US Adult Contemporary (Billboard)	30
US Cash Box Top 100	84

== Certifications ==
Certifications for "Freedom"
Region	Certification	Certified units/sales
Netherlands (NVPI)	Gold	75,000^{^}
United Kingdom (BPI)	Gold	700,000
^{^} Shipments figures based on certification alone.

== Cover versions ==
British country singer Tommy Atkins released a cover version of "Freedom" in 2020. His version featured an "openly gay" lyric edit, swapping in "boy, all I really want is you." The recording reached the top 5 on download charts across the UK, Canada and New Zealand. The recording made history, becoming the first country hit in the UK and Europe to feature overtly gay lyrics. Atkins' version was playlisted by hundreds of major country radio and pop stations. The cultural significance of this was acknowledged in the BBC 6 Music documentary Loud and Proud.
