= The Edge of Heaven =

- Artwork for the UK release of the single

Single by Wham!

from the album The Final and Music from the Edge of Heaven
- B-side: "Wham! Rap '86" (UK 7"); "Blue (Live in China)" (US); "Where Did Your Heart Go?" (UK 12"); "Battlestations" (UK 12")
- Released: 9 June 1986
- Recorded: 1986
- Studio: Sarm West (London)
- Genre: Dance-pop; disco
- Length: 4:34
- Label: Epic; Columbia
- Songwriter: George Michael
- Producer: George Michael

Wham! singles chronology
"I'm Your Man" (1985)	"The Edge of Heaven" (1986)	"Where Did Your Heart Go?" (1986)

Music video
- "The Edge of Heaven" on YouTube

Alternative cover
- Artwork for the US release of the single

"The Edge of Heaven" is a song by the English pop duo Wham!, released on 9 June 1986 by Epic Records in the United Kingdom and most of the world, and Columbia Records in the United States. It was written and produced by George Michael, one half of the duo, and was promoted in advance as Wham!'s farewell single.

The single, a five-minute tale of emotional and physical frustration within a relationship, featured a guest appearance by Elton John on piano, and became Wham!'s fourth No. 1 hit on the UK singles chart and their final US top-ten hit.

== Background ==
Between 1982 and 1985, the pop duo Wham! had released two studio albums, and enjoyed a string of success, with three of their singles reaching number one on the UK singles chart. With the known desire of George Michael to move into a more adult market, Wham! announced in early 1986 that Michael and his musical partner Andrew Ridgeley would go their separate ways after a farewell single, album, and a concert.

The farewell concert, entitled the Final, was held in front of 72,000 fans at London's Wembley Stadium on 28 June 1986. The accompanying album, also entitled The Final, was released on 7 July 1986. In North America, a pared-down version of the album (entitled Music from the Edge of Heaven) was issued instead.

== Production ==
Prior to its official release, "The Edge of Heaven" had been performed during Wham!'s Whamamerica! tour in 1985. Michael said the lyrics to the song were "deliberately and overtly sexual, especially the first verse". The reason for this, he said, was he thought no one would care "because no one listens to a Wham! lyric. It had got to that stage."

== Release ==
Epic released a double record set in the UK, with an updated version of Wham!'s early signature song "Wham Rap! (Enjoy What You Do)" on the flip of disc one, and two new songs—"Battlestations" and a cover of the Was (Not Was) song "Where Did Your Heart Go?"—on the flip-side of the second disc. "Where Did Your Heart Go?" was later given an equal billing and reached the UK top 40 as a result.

In the United States, "The Edge of Heaven" was backed with a live version of "Blue" from Wham!'s tour of China. "Where Did Your Heart Go?" was released separately as the fourth and final single from the Music from the Edge of Heaven album, and charted at number 50.

== Critical reception ==
Reviewing "The Edge of Heaven", Cash Box said that "the live-wire, uptempo track moves along at a "Wake Me Up Before You Go-Go" pace." Amy Hanson of AllMusic opined that the song "emerges snappy and sexy and somehow subversive as Michael put fans through his paces with this breathless come-on that left everyone waiting for more."

In 2021, "The Edge of Heaven" was included on The Guardian's list of George Michael's 30 greatest songs. Ranking the song 20th, reviewer Alexis Petridis stated that it is a "sophisticated example of Michael's way with an irrepressible 60s soul pastiche, with lyrics that played on the duo's imminent demise: 'One last time might be for ever.'"

== Music video ==
The official music video for "The Edge of Heaven" was directed by Andy Morahan and filmed at stage 1, Twickenham Film Studios in June 1986. It features a performance in front of a crowd and is filmed in black and white. It features a brief early appearance by Danny John-Jules, emerging from the audience to dance alongside Michael onstage, as well as appearances by David Austin on guitar and Deon Estus on bass.

== Track listing ==
All tracks are written by George Michael, except where noted.

7-inch: Epic / A FIN 1 (UK)
No.	Title	Writer(s)	Length
1.	"The Edge of Heaven"		4:37
2.	"Wham! Rap '86"	Michael; Andrew Ridgeley	6:33

7-inch: Columbia / 38-06182 (US)
No.	Title	Length
1.	"The Edge of Heaven"	4:37
2.	"Blue" (Live in China)	5:18

2×7-inch: Epic / FIN 1 (UK) – Limited edition double 7-inch pack
No.	Title	Writer(s)	Length
1.	"The Edge of Heaven"		4:37
2.	"Wham! Rap '86"	Michael; Ridgeley	6:33
3.	"Battlestations"		5:25
4.	"Where Did Your Heart Go?"	David Was; Don Was	5:43

12-inch: Epic / FIN T1 (UK)
No.	Title	Writer(s)	Length
1.	"Battlestations"		5:25
2.	"Where Did Your Heart Go?"	David Was; Don Was	5:43
3.	"The Edge of Heaven"		4:37
4.	"Wham! Rap '86"	Michael; Ridgeley	6:33

== Personnel ==
Credits adapted from Music from the Edge of Heaven album liner notes.

- Charlie Morgan – drums
- Hugh Burns – guitar
- Deon Estus – bass
- Elton John – piano
- David Austin – guitar
- Andy Hamilton – keyboards
- Paul Spong – trumpet
- Rick Taylor – trombone
- Simon Gardner – trumpet
- Danny Cummings – percussion

== Charts ==
=== Weekly charts ===
Weekly chart performance for "The Edge of Heaven"
Chart (1986)	Peak position
Australia (Kent Music Report)	2
Austria (Ö3 Austria Top 40)	11
Belgium (Ultratop 50 Flanders)	1
Bolivia (UPI)	4
Canada Top Singles (RPM)	10
Europe (European Hot 100 Singles)	1
Finland (Suomen virallinen lista)	3
France (SNEP)	22
Greece (Music & Media)	1
Iceland (RÚV)	2
Ireland (IRMA)	1
Italy (Musica e dischi)	2
Netherlands (Dutch Top 40)	1
Netherlands (Single Top 100)	1
Norway (VG-lista)	2
New Zealand (Recorded Music NZ)	3
Sweden (Sverigetopplistan)	10
Switzerland (Schweizer Hitparade)	4
UK Singles (Official Charts)	1
US Billboard Hot 100	10
US Adult Contemporary (Billboard)	22
US Adult Contemporary (Radio & Records)	20
US Contemporary Hit Radio (Radio & Records)	9
West Germany (GfK)	4

=== Year-end charts ===
Year-end chart performance for "The Edge of Heaven"
Chart (1986)	Position
Australia (Kent Music Report)	57
Belgium (Ultratop)	11
Canada Top Singles (RPM)	92
Netherlands (Dutch Top 40)	10
Netherlands (Single Top 100)	17
Switzerland (Schweizer Hitparade)	26
West Germany (Media Control)	33

== Certifications ==
Certifications for "The Edge of Heaven"
Region	Certification	Certified units/sales
United Kingdom (BPI) The Edge of Heaven/Where Did Your Heart Go?	Silver	519,894
