= Where Did Your Heart Go? =

1981 single by Was (Not Was)

Single by Was (Not Was)

from the album Was (Not Was)
- A-side: "Wheel Me Out" (UK)
- B-side: "It's an Attack!" (France)
- Released: September 1981 (US)
- Recorded: January–March 1981
- Studio: Sound Suite (Detroit)
- Genre: Post-disco; dance-rock
- Length: 4:55
- Label: ZE; Island
- Songwriters: David Was; Don Was
- Producers: David Was; Don Was; Jack Tann; Michael Zilkha

Was (Not Was) singles chronology
"Out Come the Freaks" (1981)	"Where Did Your Heart Go?" / "Wheel Me Out" (1981)	"Tell Me That I'm Dreaming" (1982)

"Where Did Your Heart Go?" is a song written by American musicians David Was and Don Was. The song was recorded and released by the writers' band Was (Not Was) as a single in the UK (as a double A-side with "Wheel Me Out") in September 1981, and the single did not chart. It is featured as the second track on the band's debut album Was (Not Was) in August 1981. French editions of the single include the track "It's an Attack!" as the B-side.

A live recording of "Where Did Your Heart Go?" was included as a B-side to the 1992 single "Somewhere in America (There's a Street Named After My Dad)".

== Track listing ==
All tracks are written by David Was and Don Was.

7": ZE-Island / WIP 6716 (UK)
No.	Title	Length
1.	"Where Did Your Heart Go?"	4:51
2.	"Wheel Me Out"	3:33

12": ZE-Island / 12WIP 6716 (UK)
No.	Title	Length
1.	"Where Did Your Heart Go?"	4:51
2.	"Wheel Me Out" (long version)	7:04

== Wham! version ==
"Where Did Your Heart Go?"

Single by Wham!

from the album The Final and Music from the Edge of Heaven
- A-side: "The Edge of Heaven" (UK, IRE)
- B-side: "Wham! Rap '86"
- Released: October 1986
- Recorded: 1986
- Studio: Sarm West (London)
- Genre: Pop
- Length: 5:45 (album version); 4:59 (single version)
- Label: Epic; Columbia
- Songwriters: David Was; Don Was
- Producer: George Michael

Wham! singles chronology
"The Edge of Heaven" (1986)	"Where Did Your Heart Go?" (1986)

Music video
- "Where Did Your Heart Go?" on YouTube

"Where Did Your Heart Go?" was covered by the English pop duo Wham! in 1986 as one of the three B-sides to "The Edge of Heaven", which reached number one in the UK. The song was also released separately as Wham!'s final single in several territories, most notably in the US where it peaked at number 50 on the Billboard Hot 100 in November 1986. It was produced and re-arranged by Wham! singer George Michael, with engineering by Chris Porter. "Where Did Your Heart Go?" was also included on the compilation albums The Final and Music from the Edge of Heaven.

=== Arrangement ===
Michael's arrangement of "Where Did Your Heart Go?" is relatively faithful to the Was (Not Was) version making only subtle changes to the song's instrumentation and structure. Michael alters the song by dropping the opening chorus in favour of an instrumental introduction of the chorus melody. The subdued ending is protracted in the Wham! recording, where the original quickly fades out after the completion of the final chorus; Michael's arrangement continues for an additional half a minute. This recording features a tenor saxophone solo from Andy Hamilton.

Wham!'s recording of "Where Did Your Heart Go?", while structurally similar to the Was (Not Was) original, leans toward a soft rock ballad due to changes to the tempo and vocal inflexion. Michael's arrangement is more spare and reliant on synthesizers and saxophone to convey the melody. Michael's vocals are less immersed in the backing arrangement in which the bass guitar and drums are markedly quieter in the mix. His vocal is more low-key than Sweet Pea Atkinson's, except for the final line of the third verse, "and drifted out of sight", which is accentuated.

=== Music video ===
The official music video for the Wham! version of the song was directed by George Michael and Andy Morahan.

=== Track listing ===
7": Columbia / 38-06294 (US)
No.	Title	Writer(s)	Length
1.	"Where Did Your Heart Go?"	David Was; Don Was	4:59
2.	"Wham! Rap '86"	George Michael; Andrew Ridgeley	6:33

12": Epic / EPC 650150 6 (Netherlands)
No.	Title	Writer(s)	Length
1.	"Where Did Your Heart Go?"	David Was; Don Was	5:45
2.	"Wham! Rap '86"	George Michael; Andrew Ridgeley	6:33

=== Personnel ===
- George Michael – vocals, keyboards, programming, producer, arrangements
- Andrew Ridgeley – backing vocals, guitar
- Deon Estus – bass
- Danny Schogger – keyboards
- Andy Hamilton – tenor saxophone
- Chris Porter – engineer, mixing

=== Charts ===
Weekly chart performance for "Where Did Your Heart Go?"
Chart (1986)	Peak position
Australia (Kent Music Report)	54
Austria (Ö3 Austria Top 40)	23
Finland (Suomen virallinen lista)	19
France (SNEP)	42
Iceland (RÚV)	15
Netherlands (Dutch Tipparade 40)	7
Netherlands (Single Top 100)	37
US Billboard Hot 100	50
US Adult Contemporary (Billboard)	33
US Cash Box Top 100	49
US Adult Contemporary (Radio & Records)	28
