= Young Guns (Go for It) =

Single by Wham!

from the album Fantastic
- B-side: "Going for It"
- Released: 17 September 1982
- Recorded: 1982
- Studio: Maison Rouge (London)
- Genre: Dance-pop; post-disco; pop rap
- Length: 3:40 (single version); 5:10 (UK extended version); 6:53 (US extended version)
- Label: CBS
- Songwriter: George Michael
- Producers: Steve Brown; George Michael

Wham! singles chronology
"Wham Rap! (Enjoy What You Do)" (1982)	"Young Guns (Go for It)" (1982)	"Wham Rap! (Enjoy What You Do)" (special U.S. re-mix) (1983)

Music video
- "Young Guns (Go for It)" on YouTube

"Young Guns (Go for It)" (also listed as "Young Guns (Go for It!)" on some releases) is a song by English pop duo Wham! first released as a single in the UK by Innervision Records on 17 September 1982. Written and co-produced by George Michael, the song became Wham!'s first hit both in the UK and internationally after the BBC music programme Top of the Pops invited the duo onto the show as a last-minute replacement for another act which had pulled out, as the show's then-executive producer Michael Hurll had seen them on another programme, Saturday Superstore.

== Composition ==
Michael wrote "Young Guns (Go for It)" about a teenage boy's worry that his best friend is getting too committed to a girl when he should be enjoying his youth and the single life. It features a middle eight aside in which the girl conversely tries to get her boyfriend to ditch the best friend, prompting a vocal battle, akin to a tug of war, between the girlfriend and the best friend, which prompted the 'go for it' aspect of the song, as featured in the title.

== Top of the Pops ==
Wham! were just outside the top 40 threshold of the UK Singles Chart when they were invited to perform "Young Guns (Go for It)" on Top of the Pops, which meant they had not climbed high enough in normal circumstances to get on the show, but they were recruited nonetheless as the highest-placed artists still climbing the charts from outside the top 40. On Top of the Pops, Michael mimed the vocals to his Wham! partner Andrew Ridgeley, who acted the part of the teenage bridegroom-in-waiting. They were flanked by backing singers Dee C. Lee and Shirlie Holliman.

The original recording does not feature the voices of Lee or Holliman but that of American backing singer Lynda Hayes.

== Chart performance ==
"Young Guns (Go for It)" entered the UK singles chart initially at number 72, went up to number 48 the following week, then dropped to number 52 before jumping to number 42. Wham!'s appearance on Top of the Pops broke the record wide open and on the following Monday the distribution centre received some thirty thousand orders, sending the record to number 24 before it eventually peaked at number 3 in early December 1982.

== Track listings ==
All tracks are written by George Michael.

7″: Innervision / IVL A2766 (UK)
No.	Title	Length
1.	"Young Guns (Go for It)"	3:40
2.	"Going for It"	3:40

12″: Innervision / IVL A13 2766 (UK)
No.	Title	Length
1.	"Young Guns (Go for It)" (12" version)	5:10
2.	"Going for It" (7" version)	3:40

12″: Columbia/Innervision 44-03501 (US)
No.	Title	Length
1.	"Young Guns (Go for It)"	6:53
2.	"Going for It!"	4:49

- "Going for It" is an instrumental version of "Young Guns (Go for It)"

== Personnel ==
Credits adapted from Fantastic album liner notes.

- George Michael – lead vocals
- Graham Broad – drums
- Brad Lang – bass
- Robert Ahwai – guitar
- Andrew Ridgeley – guitar
- Anne Dudley – keyboards
- Andy Mackintosh – horns
- J. Healey – horns
- Bert Ezard – horns
- Linda Hayes – backing vocals
- Josie James – backing vocals
- Dee C. Lee – backing vocals
- Shirlie Holliman – backing vocals

== Charts ==
=== Weekly charts ===
Weekly chart performance for "Young Guns (Go for It)"
Chart (1982–1983)	Peak position
Australia (Kent Music Report)	4
Belgium (Ultratop 50 Flanders)	8
Finland (Suomen virallinen lista)	11
Netherlands (Dutch Top 40)	4
Netherlands (Single Top 100)	9
New Zealand (Recorded Music NZ)	4
Norway (VG-lista)	10
Sweden (Sverigetopplistan)	1
UK Singles (Official Charts)	3
West Germany (GfK)	20

=== Year-end charts ===
Year-end chart performance for "Young Guns (Go for It)"
Chart (1983)	Position
Australia (Kent Music Report)	30
Belgium (Ultratop Flanders)	77
Netherlands (Dutch Top 40)	93

== Certifications ==
Certifications for Young Guns (Go for It)
Region	Certification	Certified units/sales
United Kingdom (BPI)	Silver	409,120
