= Innervision Records =

British record label

- Founded: 1981
- Founder: Mark Dean
- Defunct: 1985
- Distributor: CBS Records
- Genre: Pop
- Country of origin: United Kingdom

Innervision Records was an independent record label distributed by CBS Records. The label was established around 1981 by Mark Dean and Shamsi Ahmed. Perhaps the most recognizable artist associated with Innervision was Wham!, who scored four top-ten hits while signed to the label.

Additional Innervision artists included Jimmy the Hoover, who had a top 20 hit with "Tantalise"; and the groups Animal Nightlife, the Promise, Girl Talk, and Space Monkey. Innervision released its last single in 1985, by that time the label's records were being distributed by EMI.

== Legal disputes ==
In 1983, Andrew Ridgeley of Wham! became conscious of legal problems with their initial contract at Innervision. While the legal battle raged, Innervision released a single containing a medley of non-single tracks from the album Fantastic, titled "Club Fantastic Megamix". Wham! publicly denounced the release and urged fans not to buy it. After the legal wrangling, Innervision admitted there were royalty discrepancies with Wham!'s contract and it was nullified as part of a legal compromise with CBS Records. The fall-out from the lawsuit led to the bankruptcy and eventual dissolution of Innervision altogether in 1985.

== See also ==
- List of record labels
