= Make It Big =

Studio album by Wham!
- Released: 22 October 1984 (US); 5 November 1984 (UK)
- Recorded: 1984
- Studios: Miraval (France); Marcadet (Paris) (Note: "Everything She Wants"); Advision (London) (Note: Vocals and synth overdubs on "Careless Whisper"); Sarm West (London)
- Genres: Pop; new wave; pop-soul
- Length: 38:02
- Labels: Epic (UK); Columbia (US)
- Producer: George Michael

Wham! chronology
Fantastic (1983)	Make It Big (1984)	Music from the Edge of Heaven (1986)

Alternative cover
- Album cover in North America

Singles from Make It Big
- 1. "Wake Me Up Before You Go-Go" Released: 14 May 1984; 2. "Careless Whisper" Released: 23 July 1984; 3. "Freedom" Released: 1 October 1984; 4. "Everything She Wants" Released: 3 December 1984

Make It Big is the second studio album by English pop duo Wham!, released in 1984. In comparison to their earlier work, Wham! (George Michael and Andrew Ridgeley) had more control over the album's production and Michael would also be credited as a producer.

The album was a commercial success, hitting number one in both the US and the UK and spawning four singles, all reaching the top three in the US and the UK. Make It Big was certified 4× platinum in the US during the time of its release, and has since been certified 6× platinum in the US. In March 2024, Make It Big was reissued on vinyl for the first time in 30 years.

The music video for single "Wake Me Up Before You Go-Go" had the duo in shirts that read 'Choose Life'. It would be the first of several hits from the album. The second single from the album, "Careless Whisper", when released was credited to either Wham! featuring George Michael (in North America and several other countries) or solely to George Michael (in the United Kingdom and some European countries) as it became apparent that at some point, Michael would embark on a solo career. The music video for third single "Freedom" featured the duo while performing a concert in China; incidentally Wham! would become the first Western popular music act to tour China. The fourth single "Everything She Wants" was released as a double A-side with the eventual classic "Last Christmas"; "Last Christmas" would later appear on the duo's Music from the Edge of Heaven (1986), an album released only in North America and Japan.

== Background and production ==
Make It Big was mostly written and recorded at Studio Miraval in Southern France over a course of six weeks, beginning in early July 1984. This allowed George Michael to escape press attention and work peacefully. According to Andrew Ridgeley, the decision to record in the south of France was made largely due to tax reasons, as well as it being the ideal place for them to spend the summer due to the hot weather. Plus, it was one and a half hours away from London, and Michael "had to keep going back to do things for 'Careless Whisper'". Like "Careless Whisper" and "Wake Me Up Before You Go-Go", most of the songs were recorded with a live rhythm section.

The main album credits attribute it as having been mixed at Good Earth Studios in London and Marcadet Studios in Paris. However, engineer Chris Porter later revealed that most of the album was mixed at Sarm West's Studio 2 (where "Careless Whisper" and "Wake Me Up Before You Go-Go" were recorded), with some mixing already completed at Studio Miraval. Some additional recordings were done at Advision Studios, including parts of "Careless Whisper".

== Critical reception ==
Professional ratings
Review scores
Source	Rating
AllMusic	4.5/5 stars
Q	4/5 stars
Record Mirror	2/5 stars
Rolling Stone	4/5 stars
Uncut	4/5 stars
The Village Voice	B

Make It Big, Wham!'s second album, would see the duo score hit singles in the United States. Their first album Fantastic was a hit in the UK but failed to make an impact in the US. Make It Big received some positive reviews. Christopher Connelly from Rolling Stone wrote that the "music is an unabashed rehash of Motown", adding, "Make It Big is an almost flawless pop record, a record that does exactly what it wants to and has a great deal of fun doing it." Billboard described the album as "a one-two punch", while Cash Box described its sound as "less tense, more tuneful". In a retrospective review, Stephen Thomas Erlewine from AllMusic writes, "They succeeded on a grander scale than they ever could have imagined, conquering the world and elsewhere with this effervescent set of giddy new wave pop-soul."

== Promotion ==
Wham! embarked on a world tour to promote the album in December 1984, opening at Whitley Bay's Ice Rink, before going on to dates in Japan, Australia, United States, United Kingdom, Hong Kong and China, ending in April 1985 at the Sun Yat-sen Memorial Hall in Canton.

== Track listing ==
All tracks are written by George Michael, except where noted.

Side one
No.	Title	Length
1.	"Wake Me Up Before You Go-Go"	3:50
2.	"Everything She Wants"	5:01
3.	"Heartbeat"	4:42
4.	"Like a Baby"	4:12

Side two
No.	Title	Writer(s)	Length
1.	"Freedom"		5:01
2.	"If You Were There" (The Isley Brothers cover)	Ernie Isley; Marvin Isley; Chris Jasper	3:38
3.	"Credit Card Baby"		5:08
4.	"Careless Whisper"	Michael; Andrew Ridgeley	6:30
Total length:			38:02

== Personnel ==
Credits adapted from LP liner notes

Wham!

- George Michael – lead vocals, backing vocals, all keyboards on (2, 4)
- Andrew Ridgeley – electric guitars

Additional musicians

- Tommy Eyre – keyboards
- Andy Richards – keyboards (8)
- Hugh Burns – electric guitars, acoustic guitars
- Deon Estus – bass guitar
- Trevor Murrell – drums, LinnDrum (1)
- David Baptiste – alto saxophone
- Steve Gregory – tenor saxophone (8)
- Colin Graham – trumpet
- Paul Spong – trumpet

=== Production ===
- George Michael – producer, arrangements
- Chris Porter – engineer
- Paul Gomersall – assistant engineer
- P/S/A – design
- Tony McGee – photography

== Charts ==
=== Weekly charts ===
Weekly chart performance for Make It Big
Chart (1984–85)	Peak position
Australian Kent Music Report	1
Austrian Albums Chart	4
Canadian RPM Albums Chart	1
Dutch Albums Chart	1
European Top 100 Albums	1
Finnish Albums (Suomen virallinen lista)	1
Italian M&D Albums Chart	1
Japanese LPs Charts (Oricon and Music Labo)	1
New Zealand Albums Chart	1
Norwegian Albums Chart	1
Swedish Albums Chart	3
Swiss Albums Chart	1
UK Albums Chart	1
US Billboard 200	1
US Billboard Top R&B Albums	20
West German Albums Chart	5

Chart (2024)	Peak position
Greek Albums (IFPI)	73
Hungarian Physical Albums (MAHASZ)	21

=== Year-end charts ===
1984 year-end chart performance for Make It Big
Chart (1984)	Position
Australian Albums Chart	55
Canadian Albums Chart	44
French Albums Chart	19
UK Albums Chart	4

1985 year-end chart performance for Make It Big
Chart (1985)	Position
Australian Albums Chart	20
Austrian Albums Chart	13
Canadian Albums Chart	8
Japanese Albums Chart	2
New Zealand Albums (RMNZ)	19
Swiss Albums Chart	14
UK Albums Chart	18
US Billboard 200	4

=== Decade-end charts ===
1980s end chart performance for Make It Big
Chart (1980s)	Position
Japanese Albums Chart	21
UK Albums Chart	18

== Certifications and sales ==
Certifications and sales for Make It Big
Region	Certification	Certified units/sales
Australia (ARIA)	Platinum	70,000^{^}
Canada (Music Canada)	6× Platinum	600,000^{^}
Denmark (IFPI Danmark)	Gold	10,000^{‡}
Finland (Musiikkituottajat)	Platinum	53,465
France (SNEP)	2× Gold	200,000^{*}
Germany (BVMI)	Gold	250,000^{^}
Hong Kong (IFPI Hong Kong)	Platinum	20,000^{*}
Italy (FIMI) sales since 2009	Gold	25,000^{‡}
Japan (Oricon Charts)	—	821,000
Netherlands (NVPI)	Platinum	100,000^{^}
New Zealand (RMNZ)	Platinum	15,000^{^}
Poland (ZPAV)	Gold	15,000^{‡}
United Kingdom (BPI)	4× Platinum	1,300,000
United States (RIAA)	6× Platinum	6,000,000^{^}
Summaries
Worldwide	—	10,000,000
^{*} Sales figures based on certification alone.^{^} Shipments figures based on certification alone.^{‡} Sales+streaming figures based on certification alone.
