= Wham Rap! (Enjoy What You Do) =

1982 single by Wham!

- Original 1982 UK 12-inch vinyl release

Single by Wham!

from the album Fantastic
- B-side: "Wham Rap!" (club mix) (UK)
- Written: 1981
- Released: 28 May 1982; January 1983 (reissue)
- Recorded: 1982
- Studio: Halligan Band Centre (Holloway); Maison Rouge (London)
- Genre: Post-disco; dance-pop; pop rap
- Length: 3:30 (7"); 4:02 (club mix); 3:28 (7″ U.S. re-mix); 3:10 (7″ special club remix); 6:36 (Unsocial mix); 6:46 (Social mix); 6:43 (special U.S. re-mix); 3:34 (12″ Special club remix); 6:33 ('86)
- Label: CBS; Innervision
- Songwriters: George Michael; Andrew Ridgeley
- Producer: Bob Carter

Wham! singles chronology
"Wham Rap! (Enjoy What You Do)" (1982)	"Young Guns (Go for It)" (1982)
"Young Guns (Go for It)" (1982)	"Wham Rap! (Enjoy What You Do)" (special U.S. re-mix) (1983)	"Bad Boys" (1983)

Music video
- "Wham Rap! (Enjoy What You Do)" on YouTube "Wham Rap!" (club mix) on YouTube

Alternative cover art
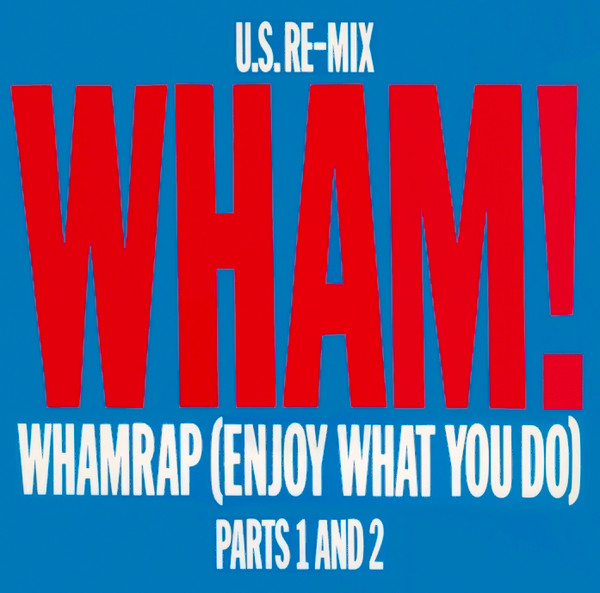
- UK vinyl single re-release (1983)

"Wham Rap! (Enjoy What You Do)", sometimes listed as "Wham Rap! (Enjoy What You Do?)", or simply "Wham Rap!", is the debut single by English pop duo Wham! on Innervision Records, released on 28 May 1982. It was written by Wham! members George Michael and Andrew Ridgeley.

== History ==
"Wham Rap!" was the first song written by Michael and Ridgeley following the breakup of their previous band, the Executive, but before Wham! had been fully established. The genesis of the song began in 1981 and was a result of Ridgeley making up his own words ("Wham! Bam! I am the man!") while dancing to "Rapper's Delight" with Michael and Shirlie Holliman in Bogart's nightclub in South Harrow. As they continued to work on the song an ultimatum to Michael from his father inspired the line "Get yourself a job or get out of this house". A demo of "Wham Rap!" was recorded by local music producer Paul Mex on 18 January 1982 along with "Careless Whisper" on Mex's TEAC 4-track Portastudio, with the resulting 2-song demo tape gaining Wham! their record contract with Innervision Records some weeks later. Innervision quickly arranged for a proper demo of the song to be recorded at Halligan Band Centre in Holloway (on 24 March 1982) using session musicians on bass and drums, which was then used by Michael and Ridgeley as a backing track for promotional performances at various nightclubs in preparation for their debut release.

== Synopsis ==
Although rap was still an underground and almost exclusively American phenomenon in the early 1980s, Michael rapped—as the title implies—a number of verses about the joys of living every day to the fullest, reveling in unemployment and celebrating government assistance from the Department of Health and Social Security (the initials "DHSS" are repeatedly chanted during the song). The explicitly political song flew in the face of the conventional British left-wing who were talking about the 'right to work' at the time. The chorus asked the question "Do you enjoy what you do?", which brought about the bracketed section of the title.

== Music video ==
The music video for "Wham Rap!" was filmed in London in February 1983 to promote the reissue of the single that January, following the success of its follow-up "Young Guns (Go for It)" the previous autumn. The video shows Michael and Ridgeley as two unemployed youths who were spending their time teaching one another on how to live their life while roaming about the streets of London. They wear leather jackets, combining their moody image with a bright, effervescent choreography.

The two are joined by Shirlie Holliman, Dee C. Lee, and their band in front of a white background with red letters reading 'WHAM!'. It is here that the group practises dance routines accompanied by background dancers.

== Chart performance ==
Upon its initial release on 28 May 1982 when Wham! were unknown, "Wham Rap!" failed to make any impact, and was later reissued in January 1983 after the duo had achieved their breakthrough with "Young Guns (Go for It)". The single subsequently reached No. 8 on the UK Singles Chart, the second release of four hits from Wham!'s debut album Fantastic.

== Versions ==
A remix of "Wham Rap!" was made in 1986, combining some of the Unsocial mix with the album version. This version, entitled "Wham! Rap '86", was released on Wham!'s American and Japanese album Music from the Edge of Heaven, and as the B-side on the 7-inch single "The Edge of Heaven" in the UK, Australia and Europe.

Uncharacteristically for Wham!, the Unsocial mix of the song contains multiple repetitions of the swear words "damn", "bullshit", "shit" and "crap". All versions include "don't need this crap". These lines were included to illustrate the band's then-rebellious image, and future songs by Wham! would mostly refrain from using this type of language (although "Battlestations" does include an instance of "bullshit"). Both the Social mix and the Fantastic album version have different verses from the Unsocial mix; thus, there are three different sets of verse lyrics altogether. Before the release of the 2023 compilation album The Singles: Echoes from the Edge of Heaven, only the album version has appeared on CD.

== Track listings ==
=== 1982 release ===
All tracks are written by George Michael (credited to George Panos) and Andrew Ridgeley.

7″: Innervision (UK)
No.	Title	Length
1.	"Wham Rap!"	3:30
2.	"Wham Rap!" (club mix) (a.k.a. 'special club re-mix', edited version of the 12″ 'Social mix')	4:02

12″: Innervision (UK)
No.	Title	Length
1.	"Wham Rap!" (Unsocial mix)	6:36
2.	"Wham Rap!" (Social mix)	6:46

- Note: Due to an error in labelling, the 'Unsocial mix' is listed as the single's A-side despite Michael specifically referring to it as the B-side in the song's lyrics: "Hey, everybody, now listen to me/Cut the radio bullshit, this is side B."

=== 1983 reissue ===
7″: Innervision (UK and US)
No.	Title	Length
1.	"Wham Rap! (Enjoy What You Do)" (special U.S. remix part 1) (a.k.a. 'special US re-mix')	3:28
2.	"Wham Rap! (Enjoy What You Do)" (special U.S. re-mix part 2) (a.k.a. 'special club re-mix')	3:10

12″: Innervision (UK and US)
No.	Title	Length
1.	"Wham Rap! (Enjoy What You Do)" (special US re-mix) (a.k.a. 'parts 1 and 2', identical to the Fantastic album version)	6:43
2.	"Wham Rap! (Enjoy What You Do)" (special club re-mix) (a.k.a. 'radio version', same as the 7″ version from the 1982 release)	3:34

== Personnel ==
Credits adapted from Fantastic album liner notes.

- George Michael – lead vocals, shouting
- Andy Duncan – drums and percussion, shouting
- John McKenzie – bass
- Andrew Ridgeley – guitar
- Bob Carter – keyboards, shouting
- Chris Hunter – horns
- Guy Barker – horns
- David Mortimer – shouting
- Paul Ridgeley – shouting

== Charts ==
=== Weekly charts ===
Weekly chart performance for "Wham Rap! (Enjoy What You Do)"
Chart (1983)	Peak position
Australia (Kent Music Report)	9
Belgium (Ultratop 50 Flanders)	12
Netherlands (Single Top 100)	9
Germany (GfK)	17
Ireland (IRMA)	13
New Zealand (Recorded Music NZ)	18
UK Singles (Official Charts)	8

=== Year-end charts ===
Year-end chart performance for "Wham Rap! (Enjoy What You Do)"
Chart (1983)	Position
Australia (Kent Music Report)	77
