= Everything She Wants =

- UK 7-inch vinyl variant of the standard picture sleeve

Single by Wham!

from the album Make It Big
- A-side: "Last Christmas"
- B-side: "Like a Baby"
- Released: 3 December 1984
- Recorded: 1984
- Studio: Marcadet (Paris); London
- Genre: Synth-pop; electropop; dance-pop; dance; R&B
- Length: 5:01 (album version); 5:10 (US short remix version); 5:30 (UK short remix version); 6:34 (long remix and video version)
- Label: Columbia; Epic
- Songwriter: George Michael
- Producer: George Michael

Wham! singles chronology
"Last Christmas" (1984)	"Everything She Wants" (1984)	"I'm Your Man" (1985)

Music video
- "Everything She Wants" on YouTube

Alternative cover
- UK 12-inch vinyl variant of the alternative picture sleeve

"Everything She Wants" is a single by the English pop duo Wham!, released on 3 December 1984 via Columbia Records and Epic Records as part of a double A-side single release with "Last Christmas". Written and produced by George Michael, a member of the duo, "Everything She Wants" garnered significant acclaim, marking Wham!'s third consecutive million-selling number-one hit in the United States.

== Production ==
=== Writing ===
Like most other Wham! songs from this period, "Everything She Wants" was written by George Michael. He discussed the origin of the song in the fall 1985 issue of ASCAP in Action:

"It's the only song I've written that successfully came from a backing track first. I wrote the Linn drum pattern and found a synthesizer program I liked and wrote the backing track in one evening, took it back to the hotel, and wrote the vocal in a hotel room the next morning. Because it was thrown together that way, I never looked at it as a single 'til everybody started saying it was great."

Michael elaborated on the song's lyrics and the meaning behind them in Dick Clark's Countdown radio show. Said Michael, "It's a lyric about a man who is six or eight months into a marriage which obviously isn't going well. He's faced with the 'happy' news of an arriving baby. So he's in that situation where he can't back out." "Everything She Wants" describes the situation of a man who works hard to support his family, but sees it as a trap. "It's a situation I've seen. It's not the kind of thing I usually write about. Our lyrics are usually a lot closer to the kind of pop lightweight lyric we enjoy, but it's a departure, and I think it worked."

In September 2011, during a performance at the SAP Arena in Mannheim, Germany as part of the Symphonica Tour, Michael said that the song "Understand" featured on disc three of the compilation album Twenty Five (2006) was written as a follow-up to "Everything She Wants", with the man in the song realizing that his woman cared a lot more about love than he ever dreamed of.

=== Recording ===
"Everything She Wants" was recorded in August 1984 at Marcadet Studios in Paris using a 3M 32-track recorder, and was most likely finished off at Sarm West Studio 2 in Notting Hill, London, after most of the Make It Big album had been finished at Studio Miraval in southeastern France over a period of six weeks. The song is based around a mono 2-bar LinnDrum loop, which was originally intended as a guide track, but was eventually kept on the finished record.

As a Wham! track, "Everything She Wants" is a departure in the sense that Michael recorded the song entirely by himself (with engineer Chris Porter in attendance), as opposed to the typical process of involving session musicians and Michael conveying his ideas to them. Apparently, the musicians involved in Make It Big had already flown back to the UK when Michael came around to recording the track en route from Studio Miraval, so it was partly out of necessity he worked on it himself. According to Porter, "I think this was when George started to realise that if he wanted to, he could do everything himself. He could cut out all these other people and their ideas." This would pave the way for "Last Christmas", which followed the same approach.

Michael confirms:

"For the most part I try and play everything [when writing and recording, but] it wasn't the case in Wham! Apart from [that] "Last Christmas" and "Everything She Wants" are all me."

He added that both songs were made on one synthesizer, referring to a Roland Juno-60.

== Chart performance ==
Upon release in the UK, "Last Christmas" took the majority of the attention and airplay as it was appropriate in early December as Christmas approached. However, the presence of an equally-billed flip-side meant that radio stations had something else to play once "Last Christmas" had lost its seasonal topicality.

"Do They Know It's Christmas?" by the Band Aid project, in which George Michael participated, prevented the double A-side from reaching number one in the UK singles chart (although in the process it became the biggest-selling record not to get to number one). In the US, however, "Everything She Wants" did reach number one on the Billboard Hot 100 after being released in February 1985 accompanied by a music video.

The single reached No. 1 in May of that year, becoming the third consecutive chart-topping single from the Make It Big album.

== Critical reception ==
Professional ratings
Review scores
Source	Rating
Stereogum	8/10

Reviewing the "Everything She Wants" single, Cash Box wrote that the song is a "probing R&B cut" that is "perfect dance floor material." In her review for AllMusic, Amy Hanson described the song as "another glimpse of R&B driven, synth swept dance grooves" which brings in "elements of classic blue-eyed soul." Tom Breihan of Stereogum described "Everything She Wants" as "an anguished, panicked, panting lament about not wanting to have a family."

In 2021, "Everything She Wants" was included on The Guardian's list of Michael's 30 greatest songs. Ranking the song third, reviewer Alexis Petridis stated, "If you turned over 'Last Christmas', you found Wham!'s greatest song, evidence of George Michael's rapid development as a songwriter." He described the song as "six and half minutes of lyrical misery [...] set to sublime synth-funk that has somehow never seemed to date."

== Live performances ==
Although Michael bemoaned much of Wham!'s material as he began his solo career, "Everything She Wants" remained a song of which he was proud, and he continued to perform it in his shows. Furthermore, Michael remarked in an interview (to promote 25 Live tour) that "Everything She Wants" was his favourite Wham! song.

In 1996, the song was performed at the MTV Unplugged concert.

== Other releases ==
In 1997, the song was remixed and re-released as "Everything She Wants '97" on the greatest hits album The Best of Wham!: If You Were There....

The song makes an appearance in the game Grand Theft Auto V, being accessible by selecting the Non-Stop-Pop FM radio station.

"Everything She Wants" was featured on the official soundtrack album to Last Christmas released by Sony Music on CD, 2-disc vinyl, and digital formats on 8 November 2019.

== Cover versions ==
Rapper Foxy Brown sampled the song on the track "I Can't" from her 1999 album Chyna Doll.

The a cappella group Naturally 7 sampled "Everything She Wants" on their 2011 song "Life Goes On", an arrangement that was personally approved by Michael.

In 2013, the song was covered by electro/hip-hop artist Egyptian Lover for his 2015 album, 1984. Like the original, it is also featured in Grand Theft Auto V (though only in the Enhanced Edition) on iFruit Radio.

In 2020, Alien Ant Farm recorded a rock remake of the song. Its music video, shot during the COVID-19 pandemic, features cameos from artists like Insane Clown Posse, Hyro the Hero, Charlie Benante of Anthrax, CJ Pierce of Drowning Pool, and several others. The track was eventually included on their 2024 release, Mantras.

== Music video ==
The official music video for "Everything She Wants" was directed by Andy Morahan, and consists of black and white footage of a live performance. The video also includes an extra verse not present on the Make It Big album.

== Personnel ==
- George Michael – lead and backing vocals, Roland Juno-60 synthesizer, LinnDrum programming

== Track listing ==
All tracks are written by George Michael.

7″: Epic / QA 4949 (UK)
No.	Title	Length
1.	"Everything She Wants" (short remix)	5:32
2.	"Last Christmas"	4:24

12″: Epic / QTA 4949 (UK)
No.	Title	Length
1.	"Everything She Wants" (long remix)	6:34
2.	"Last Christmas" (Pudding mix)	6:44

- Also released in a limited edition with a 1985 calendar (WQTA 4949).

7″: Columbia / 38-04840 (US)
No.	Title	Length
1.	"Everything She Wants" (remix)	5:10
2.	"Like a Baby"	4:12

12″: Columbia / 44-05180 (US)
No.	Title	Length
1.	"Everything She Wants" (long remix)	6:34
2.	"Like a Baby"	4:12

7″: Epic / 07-5p-336 (Japan)
No.	Title	Length
1.	"Everything She Wants" (remix)	5:32
2.	"Like a Baby"	4:12
3.	"Message from Wham!"

- Note: Track 1 plays the 7″ remix but is labelled only as "Remix".

== Charts ==
=== Weekly charts ===
Weekly chart performance for "Everything She Wants"
Chart (1984–1985)	Peak position
Australia (Kent Music Report)	7
Austria (Ö3 Austria Top 40)	5
Belgium (Ultratop 50 Flanders)	9
Canada (The Record)	5
Canada Top Singles (RPM)	1
Europe (European Hot 100 Singles)	4
France (SNEP)	21
Germany (GfK)	8
Iceland (RÚV)	1
New Zealand (Recorded Music NZ)	6
Norway (VG-lista)	4
South Africa (Springbok)	5
UK Singles (Official Charts)	2
US Billboard Hot 100	1
US Adult Contemporary (Billboard)	4
US Dance Club Songs (Billboard)	7
US Dance Singles Sales (Billboard)	3
US Hot R&B/Hip-Hop Songs (Billboard)	12
US Cash Box Top 100	1
US Contemporary Hit Radio (Radio & Records)	1

=== Year-end charts ===
1984 year-end chart performance for "Everything She Wants"
Chart (1984)	Position
UK Singles (Gallup)	6

1985 year-end chart performance for "Everything She Wants"
Chart (1985)	Position
Australia	149
Canada (RPM)	32
UK	42
US Billboard Hot 100	25
US Cash Box Top 100	22

== Certifications and sales ==
Certifications for "Everything She Wants"
Region	Certification	Certified units/sales
Canada (Music Canada)	Gold	50,000^{^}
New Zealand (RMNZ)	Gold	15,000^{‡}
United Kingdom (BPI)	Gold	400,000^{‡}
United States (RIAA)	Gold	500,000^{^}
^{^} Shipments figures based on certification alone.^{‡} Sales+streaming figures based on certification alone.
