= Hello Dad... I'm in Jail =

1992 compilation album by Was (Not Was)

Compilation album by Was (Not Was)
- Released: 1 June 1992
- Label: Fontana
- Producers: David Was; Don Was; Louis Biancaniello; Steve "Silk" Hurley; E-Smoove; Frankie Knuckles; Paul Staveley O'Duffy; Stevie Salas; Jack Tann; Jeffrey B. Young

Was (Not Was) chronology
Are You Okay? (1990)	Hello Dad... I'm in Jail (1992)	Boo! (2008)

Professional ratings
Review scores
Source	Rating
AllMusic	2.5/5 stars

Hello Dad... I'm in Jail is a compilation album by American band Was (Not Was), released in 1992 by Fontana Records. It contains singles and selected album tracks—some in original form and some remixed—from the band's first four studio albums Was (Not Was) (1981), Born to Laugh at Tornadoes (1983), What Up, Dog? (1988), and Are You Okay? (1990). The title Hello Dad... I'm in Jail comes from the final track on What Up, Dog?, also included on this compilation as the final track.

== Singles ==
Three singles were released from the compilation throughout 1992. A cover of the INXS song, "Listen Like Thieves", reached number 58 in the UK singles chart. This was followed by "Shake Your Head", which reached number four in the UK, becoming the band's biggest hit single there. "Shake Your Head" in its original form was included on the band's second album Born to Laugh at Tornadoes; the 1992 single release and the version included on Hello Dad... I'm in Jail is a re-recorded version with vocals by actress Kim Basinger and musician Ozzy Osbourne, and with additional production and remix by Steve "Silk" Hurley. The final single to be released from the compilation, "Somewhere in America (There's a Street Named after My Dad)", originally included on the band's third album What Up, Dog?, reached number 57.

== Track listing ==
All tracks written by David Was and Don Was, except where noted.

No.	Title	Writer(s)	Origin	Length
1.	"Listen Like Thieves"	Garry Gary Beers; Andrew Farriss; Jon Farriss; Tim Farriss; Michael Hutchence; Kirk Pengilly	new song	3:54
2.	"Shake Your Head"		new song; original version: Born to Laugh at Tornadoes	4:00
3.	"Tell Me That I'm Dreaming"		Was (Not Was)	7:46
4.	"Papa Was a Rolling Stone"	Norman Whitfield; Barrett Strong	Are You Okay?	6:42
5.	"Are You Okay?"		Are You Okay?	5:58
6.	"Spy in the House of Love"		What Up, Dog?	5:27
7.	"I Feel Better Than James Brown"		Are You Okay?	4:45
8.	"Somewhere in America (There's a Street Named after My Dad)" (Alternate Mix 1987)		What Up, Dog?	3:43
9.	"Out Come the Freaks"		What Up, Dog?	4:37
10.	"How the Heart Behaves" (Original Acoustic Guitar Demo)		Are You Okay?	3:54
11.	"Walk the Dinosaur" / "(Return to the Valley of) Out Come the Freaks"	Was; Was; Randy Jacobs / Was; Was	What Up, Dog? / Born to Laugh at Tornadoes	8:42
12.	"Hello Dad... I'm in Jail"		What Up, Dog?	1:25

Note

- On some versions of the album, "Shake Your Head" has a longer playing time of 6:49.
- Track 9, "Out Come the Freaks", a song originating on their self-titled debut album and having been re-recorded by the band several times in different versions, is the 1988 version of the song, sometimes titled "Out Come the Freaks (Again)", previously included on What Up, Dog?.
- Following on from "Walk the Dinosaur", track 11 ends with another alternative, uncredited, version of "Out Come the Freaks", this version originating on Born to Laugh at Tornadoes, where the track is titled "(Return to the Valley of) Out Come the Freaks".

== Personnel ==
Adapted from the album's liner notes.

=== Musicians ===
Was (Not Was)

- David Was – vocals (tracks 7, 12), harmonica (track 10)
- Don Was – guitar (track 10), B-3 Hammond organ (track 10)
- Sweet Pea Atkinson – vocals (tracks 1, 4–6, 11)
- Harry Bowens – vocals (tracks 3, 4, 8, 11), backing vocals (track 1)
- Carol Hall – backing vocals (track 2)
- Randy Jacobs – guitar (tracks 1, 10)
- David McMurray – saxophone (track 1)
- Donald Ray Mitchell – vocals (track 4, 10), backing vocals (track 1)

Additional musicians

- Kim Basinger – vocals (track 2)
- Louis Biancaniello – synthesizer programming & arranging (track 1)
- Cathy Cosins – backing vocals (track 2)
- G Love E – vocals (track 4)
- Ozzy Osbourne – vocals (track 2)
- Carl Small – vocals (track 3)
- Sampled speaking voice of Ronald Reagan (track 3)

=== Technical ===
- David Was – production (tracks 1–5, 7–12)
- Don Was – production (tracks 1–5, 7–12)
- Elaine Anderson – mixing assistant (track 7)
- David Bates – executive producer
- Louis Biancaniello – production (track 1)
- Dan Bosworth – remixing assistant (track 10)
- Ed Cherney – mixing (track 7)
- Keith "K. C." Cohen – mixing (track 4)
- E-Smoove – additional production & remix (track 3)
- Dave Frazer – mixing (track 1)
- Jeff Gray – mixing assistant (track 1)
- Steve "Silk" Hurley – additional production & remix (tracks 2, 3)
- Frankie Knuckles – additional production & remix (track 5)
- Bob Ludwig – mastering
- Ron Meckler – art direction
- Paul Staveley O'Duffy – production (track 6), additional production & final mix (tracks 9, 11), mixing (track 8)
- Rik Pekkonnen – remixing (track 10)
- Stevie Salas – production (track 9)
- Christoph Simon – cover illustration
- Jack Tann – production (track 3)
- Jeffrey B. Young – additional production & remix (track 6)

== Charts ==
Chart performance for Hello Dad... I'm in Jail
Chart (1992)	Peak position
Australian Albums (ARIA)	132
UK Albums (Official Charts)	61
