= Out Come the Freaks =

Trilogy of songs by Was (Not Was)

Single by Was (Not Was)

from the album Was (Not Was)
- B-side: "Hello Operator...I Mean Dad...I Mean Police...I Can't Even Remember Who I Am"
- Released: 1981
- Recorded: The Sound Suite, January–March 1981
- Genre: funk, R&B, dance
- Length: 5:41
- Label: ZE Records, Island Records
- Songwriters: David Was, Don Was
- Producers: David Was, Don Was, Jack Tann, Michael Zilkha

Was (Not Was) singles chronology
"Wheel Me Out" (1980)	"Out Come the Freaks" (1981)	"Where Did Your Heart Go?" (1981)

"Out Come the Freaks" is the name of a trilogy of songs by art-funk ensemble Was (Not Was). The trilogy consists of three songs that feature the same basic title, tune and chorus lyric: "Out Come the Freaks" (1981), "(Return to the Valley of) Out Come the Freaks" (1983), and "Out Come The Freaks" (1987) (later issued as "Out Come the Freaks (Again)".)

Despite the three songs' abundant similarities, each song is distinctive, as differing lyrics in the verses of each song tell stories about different societal outcasts. As well, each recording had a different contemporary sound, a thoroughly different arrangement, and reworked the melody while still retaining the chorus vocal: Woodwork squeaks, and out comes the freaks.

== Recordings ==
=== "Out Come the Freaks" (1981) ===
The original recording was the opening song on the group's debut album Was (Not Was). This version began with the chorus sung several times simultaneously by a number of vocalists before the rhythm section is introduced. The single became a club hit in the US and peaked at #16 on the Billboard Hot Dance Club Play Chart.

The song's parent album was later renamed Out Come The Freaks when it was remastered and expanded in 2004. A companion remix album is titled (The) Woodwork Squeaks.

=== "(Return to the Valley of) Out Come the Freaks" (1983) ===
"(Return to the Valley of) Out Come the Freaks"

Single by Was (Not Was)

from the album Born to Laugh at Tornadoes
- B-side: "Out Come The Freaks (Predominantly Funk Version)"
- Released: February 1984
- Genre: funk, R&B, dance
- Length: 4:22
- Label: Geffen Records, ZE Records
- Songwriters: David Was, Don Was
- Producers: Jack Tann, David Was, Don Was

Was (Not Was) singles chronology
"Knocked Down, Made Small (Treated Like a Rubber Ball)" (1983)	"(Return to the Valley of) Out Come the Freaks" (1984)	"Robot Girl" (1986)

The second recording is slower and sparser as opposed to the post-disco sound of the original. This version is sung by Harry Bowens, who sings the Woodwork Squeaks chorus as more of a refrain than a chant. This version adds a new introductory verse which sets up the concept of the song. The final chorus replaces the words "the freaks" with a succession of song titles including "Papa's Got A Brand New Bag" and "The Shadow of Your Smile", implying a more positive spin on the idea of a "freak" to counterpoint the earlier verses. "(Return to the Valley of) Out Come the Freaks" was the only single from Born to Laugh at Tornadoes to chart in the UK, and was also their first hit in that country, hitting the UK top 50. This version of the song also appears as a hidden track (at the end of track 11, Walk The Dinosaur) on the compilation album Hello Dad... I'm in Jail.

=== "Out Come the Freaks (Again)" (1988) ===
"Out Come the Freaks (Again)"

Single by Was (Not Was)

from the album What Up, Dog?
- B-side: "Earth To Doris"
- Released: May 1988
- Genre: funk, R&B, dance
- Length: 4:35
- Label: Fontana/Phonogram (UK), Chrysalis (US)
- Songwriters: David Was, Don Was
- Producers: David Was, Don Was, Steve Salas, Paul Staveley O'Duffy

Was (Not Was) singles chronology
"Spy in the House of Love" (1988)	"Out Come the Freaks (Again)" (1988)	"Anything Can Happen" (1988)

The third "Out Come The Freaks" recording was released in 1987 and included on the group's most successful album What Up, Dog?. It was eventually also released as one of the final singles from the album in the UK, and again peaked just inside the UK top 50. The song was listed as "Out Come the Freaks" on the album but reference to the song's reworked status was acknowledged in the inclusion of the subtitle 'Again' on the single's release. The single version was also alternatively titled "(Stuck Inside of Detroit With the) Out Come the Freaks (Again)".

This recording was once again dominated by the vocal of Harry Bowens, but a female vocalist sang the chorus refrain. The arrangement was more upbeat than the second recording but had a tighter Funk and Synth-Pop sound. The introductory verse was retained but the other verses were changed to feature different characters to the earlier versions. Instead of song titles, the more positive final chorus listed real people such as Leon Trotsky and John Coltrane.

=== "Look What's Back" (1990) ===
A fourth song related to "Out Come the Freaks" called "Look What's Back" appears as the final track on the group's fourth album Are You Okay? in 1990. The song is a 43-second acoustic camp-fire rendition in which the group chants the chorus: 'Woodwork squeaks, and out comes the freaks'.

== Remixes ==
"Out Come the Freaks"

- Album Version – 5:37
- Seven Inch – 4:28
- Extended Version – 6:39
- Dub Version – 6:10
- "Tell Me That I'm Dreaming (Souped Up Version)" / "Out Come the Freaks (Dub Version)" – 12:50
- Classic 12" Version – 7:12
- Predominantly Funk Version – 12:25

"(Return to the Valley of) Out Come the Freaks"

- Album Version – 4:22
- Seven Inch – 3:45
- Extended Version – 8:45

"Out Come the Freaks (Again)"

- Album Version – 4:35
- The Mighty Mook Mix
- The Bobby Maggot Mix

== Chart positions ==
Chart (1981) - "Out Come the Freaks"	Peak Position
U.S. Billboard Hot Dance Club Play	16
Chart (1984) - "(Return to the Valley of) Out Come the Freaks"	Peak Position
UK Singles Chart	41
Chart (1988) - "Out Come the Freaks (Again)"	Peak Position
Dutch Singles Chart	86
UK Singles Chart	44

== Covers ==
In 2026, Soft Cell released a cover of the song as the first single off their final album Danceteria (2026). Nona Hendryx features on the song.
