= Shake Your Head =

1983 song by Was (Not Was)

"Shake Your Head (Let's Go to Bed)"

Song by Was (Not Was)

from the album Born to Laugh at Tornadoes
- Released: 1983
- Length: 3:52
- Label: Geffen
- Songwriters: David Was; Don Was
- Producers: Jack Tann; David Was; Don Was

"Shake Your Head"

Single by Was (Not Was) featuring Kim Basinger and Ozzy Osbourne

from the album Hello Dad... I'm in Jail
- B-side: "I Blew Up the United States"
- Released: June 29, 1992
- Length: 3:42
- Label: Fontana
- Songwriters: David Was; Don Was
- Producers: David Was; Don Was; Steve "Silk" Hurley

Was (Not Was) singles chronology
"Listen Like Thieves" (1992)	"Shake Your Head" (1992)	"Somewhere in America (There's a Street Named after My Dad)" (1992)

"Shake Your Head" is a song by American pop rock group Was (Not Was). It was originally released in 1983 by Geffen Records on their second album, Born to Laugh at Tornadoes (1983), with Ozzy Osbourne on vocals. A 1992 re-recording, remixed by house music producer Steve "Silk" Hurley, with actress Kim Basinger and a re-recorded Osbourne on vocals, was released as a single and on the group's third compilation album, Hello Dad... I'm in Jail (1992).

== Background ==
The original version, recorded during the 1983 sessions for Born to Laugh at Tornadoes, features Black Sabbath singer Ozzy Osbourne on lead vocals. Madonna, then a young studio singer on the eve of her fame, also recorded vocals for the song, but they were not used; Don Was later told Rolling Stone that she "did a great job" but that the result did not sound typical of Was (Not Was). Was had known Osbourne since his folk band opened for Black Sabbath in 1974.

In 1992, it was re-recorded and remixed by house music producer Steve "Silk" Hurley, and features actress Kim Basinger alongside a re-recorded Ozzy Osbourne on vocals. It appeared on the group's compilation album Hello Dad... I'm in Jail.

The original plan for the re-release was to restore Madonna's vocals to the track, but she refused to grant permission, hence Basinger was approached instead. However, Madonna's vocals were released on two occasions. Some reports described this as a mistake, but Don Was said in a 2025 Rolling Stone interview that the band knew the vocals were Madonna's when they gave the track to a remixer. A full Madonna vocal appears on the two-LP and double-cassette formats of compilation release Now Dance 92, entitled the 12-inch mix. The CD format of this compilation includes the regular 7-inch mix, however. The 12-inch and CD single formats of Was (Not Was)'s follow-up single, "Somewhere in America (There's a Street Named after My Dad)", includes a Dub Mix of "Shake Your Head" which uses several of Madonna's vocals. Although the song did not chart in the US, it was the band's biggest commercial success in the United Kingdom, reaching number four on the UK Singles Chart.

There are several versions of the 1992 remake:

- The 3:48 single version starts with Ozzy Osbourne singing "You can't feed the hungry, you can't talk Shakespeare to a monkey..."
- The 4:00 album version starts with Kim Basinger singing "You can't argue with death. You can't break a burly sailor's neck...". There is also a Steve "Silk" Hurley 12-inch mix and a 12-inch dub.

While the song's verses list things that cannot be done (some are outlandish, some can be done, but have a high amount of difficulty), the chorus rects with the advice to "Shake your head" and "Let's go to bed".

== Track listings ==
- 7-inch and cassette single
1. "Shake Your Head" – 3:42
2. "I Blew Up the United States" – 3:51
- 12-inch single

A1. "Shake Your Head" – 6:49
A2. "I Blew Up the United States" – 3:51
B1. "Listen Like Thieves" (Giant club mix)
B2. "Listen Like Thieves" (Vandal dub)

- CD single
1. "Shake Your Head"
2. "Spy in the House of Love"
3. "I Blew Up the United States"
4. "Robot Girl"

== Charts ==
=== Weekly charts ===
Chart (1992)	Peak position
Australia (ARIA)	47
Europe (Eurochart Hot 100)	20
Europe (European Dance Radio)	5
Germany (GfK)	77
Ireland (IRMA)	8
Portugal (AFP)	3
Sweden (Sverigetopplistan)	39
UK Singles (Official Charts)	4
UK Airplay (Music Week)	2
UK Dance (Music Week)	15
UK Club Chart (Music Week)	15

=== Year-end chart ===
Chart (1992)	Position
Europe (European Dance Radio)	25
UK Singles (OCC)	44
UK Airplay (Music Week)	25

== Release history ==
Region	Date	Format(s)	Label(s)	Ref.
United Kingdom	June 29, 1992	7-inch vinyl; 12-inch vinyl; CD; cassette	Fontana	
Australia	August 24, 1992	CD; cassette	Fontana	

== Other versions ==
In 2003, Dutch-German pop singer C. C. Catch released a version of the song that reached number 12 on the Spanish Singles Chart.
