= Kathy Kosins =

American jazz and R&B singer

- Birth name: Kathy Ann Kosins
- Born: Highland Park, Michigan, United States
- Genres: Jazz, blues, R&B, disco, traditional pop
- Occupation(s): Singer, songwriter, painter
- Years active: 1976–present
- Labels: Resonance; Capitol; Quality; Chiaroscuro; Tabu; Mahogany Jazz
- Website: Kathy Kosins.com

Kathy Ann Kosins is an American singer specializing in jazz and R&B; she is also an ASCAP award-winning songwriter and modern abstractionist painter. Kosins has recorded several CDs under her own name and was first known as a singer of soul, rock, and pop having worked extensively with the bands Was (Not Was), Slingshot and recording artist Michael Henderson. In more recent years, she has become an internationally known jazz singer; as a multi-media artist she also incorporates her painting into those live presentations.

== Biography ==
=== Early years and education ===
Kathy Kosins was born in Highland Park, Michigan to Marilyn and Harry Kosins. Her father was a well-known clothing store owner (Kosins Clothes) who dressed many of the Motown acts and music personalities. Kosins worked in her father's store as a child and was heavily influenced by being able to meet prominent pop artists, music personalities such as Berry Gordy, Diana Ross, Jerry Vale, Dinah Washington, Marvin Gaye, Smokey Robinson, the Temptations, Lou Rawls, and the Four Tops. Her father took her on one of his clothing buying trips to New York in 1967 where she saw the Broadway production of Hair, and she was "sold on being a performer" from that point on. She was primarily listening to pop and R&B while her brother David (two years younger) was listening to records such as Lester Bowie and the Art Ensemble of Chicago, Bud Powell, Miles Davis, John Coltrane, and Charlie Parker. She notes the wide range of music she was exposed to early on; she was most influenced by Janis Joplin as a singer growing up. Kosins attended Southfield High School and then Oakland Community College where she completed an Associate degree.

=== Detroit and rocks bands (1976-1992), Was (Not Was) ===
Kosins early on was working with rock bands in the late 1970s and had worked with Michael Henderson. Kosins was 24 when she met David Weiss (David Was) and Don Fagenson (Don Was). She met Don Was in the studio when he and Jack Tann were putting together the first record for the band Was (Not Was). The two men had a hit single before the first 1981 album Was (Not Was). She gave them a demo of her singing and was eventually hired as a backup singer and the contractor for other background singers for Was (Not Was). She toured and recorded with Was (Not Was) and with Michael Henderson as a background vocalist during this time through the late 1980s. She was also singing and arranging background vocals for producer Don Was on numerous sessions, which led to her becoming one of the most sought after session singers in the region. Don Was produced her 1982 single You Shook Me All Night Long, which is a re-make of the AC/DC tune (with Slingshot). Kosins comments on the first Was (Not Was) hit album, "It was the best...this really was for me the most creative project I think I was ever involved in." She went on to do several other albums with Was (Not Was) through the 1980s; she also recorded with the British band Floy Joy.

Kosins had another dance single in 1985 she produced and wrote, "I Got The Night Off", which was distributed by Carrere/Sony of France. Besides playing in Europe, the recording did make it back to the United States and was popular with Hi-NRG DeeJays playing Euro disco. During the late 1980s and early 1990s she established working relationships with songwriters and collaborated with Jeff Franzel, April Lang, Lisa Ives, and Walt Szymanski among others. She became a full-time songwriter doing mostly R&B, jazz and pop. Her song writing credits for recordings, TV and movies number at least one-hundred to include music for the Snoop Dogg movie Soul Plane. She has also been a voice over and jingle talent for many television and radio commercials.

== Jazz and painting (1993-present) ==
=== Moving into singing jazz ===
From 1993 through 1995 Kosins had her first notable engagements as a jazz singer with the J.C. Heard and Nelson Riddle Orchestras. In the early 1990s, Kosins started to move her song writing into a more traditional jazz approach. She was writing in New York with Jeff Franzel; she was also working with Marcy Drexler and April Lang. Franzel, Lang and Kosins started writing what would become Kosins' first CD as a primary artist, All in a Dream's Work. Kosins had solicited this first set of tunes to a number of established jazz singers without result. She recorded the songs herself for the 1996 release with Schoolkids Records, it featured a collection of nine originals and an arrangement of the Miles Davis composition "Four". The recording was played on over 250 jazz stations, her debut jazz offering reached the Top 20 in the Gavin Report.

Her CD Mood Swings was released in 2002 on Chiaroscuro Records and received very good air-play on the radio. The CD Vintage was released in 2005 and again she received very good reviews and airplay. Through a collaboration with singer Kevin Mahogany and singing with him on his Big Joe Turner Show (Mahogany's Kansas City Revue and the Detroit-Memphis Experience), Kosins signed in 2005 with Mahogany Jazz; she toured Europe with Mahogany in 2009. Vintage and her most recent recording The Space In Between (2013) are with the Mahogany Jazz Records label.

In 2010 Kosins decided to take a new approach by releasing singles quarterly under the new Mahogany Digital label, rather than an entire CD every few years. "If a live audience falls in love with a new song, I can record and release it to radio while the music is fresh and hot. This is something you can't do if you're committed in advance to a full album release," said Kosins. Also she adds, "Vocalists are performing music that they, not their parents, grew up with. They feel this music in a convincing way and are destined to widen their audience with music that is both appealing and legitimate."

In more recent years Kosins has utilized the talents of arrangers Paul Keller, Jack Cooper, and Tamir Hendelman for her big band book, the show Rhapsody in Boop and the 2012 CD release To The Ladies Of Cool with Resonance. To The Ladies Of Cool is a contemporary exploration of the West Coast School of Cool that focuses on the music of Anita O'Day, June Christy, Chris Connor and Julie London with music orchestrated by Hendelman for jazz quintet. Her tune "Hershey's Kisses" was co-authored with Johnny Mandel (from To The Ladies Of Cool) and also his "Little Black Night Gown", which first became famous with Gerry Mulligan's big band. Her show Rhapsody in Boop was premiered with the Jazz Orchestra of the Delta and has been performed in numerous venues in the United States.

=== Painting ===
Kosins is a painter of modern abstractions and the works she produces are visual interpretations of audio recordings by the jazz greats. She started painting in 1990, around the time her father died, but it had nothing to do with his death. Her artwork has been shown in art gallery exhibitions and are held in private collections, including recent acquisitions from the Monk Institute in Los Angeles, Baruch College, the Oregon Council for the Arts and the Milford Center for the Arts. She comments, "I like painting it keeps me sane. It keeps my Jou Jou going."

== Music and art education in schools ==
As a jazz educator and recording artist, she has been an artist in residence at over 180 colleges and universities over the past decade. She developed a unique workshop titled, Improvisation On Canvas. The clinic has been well received with music, dance, art and theater students/professionals.

== Awards and grants ==
- ASCAP song writing awards
- Michigan Council for the Arts (Jazz Composer of the Year)
- Michigan ArtServe Advocacy Group (grants)

== Venues performed at (partial list) ==
- Birdland - New York
- The Blue Note - New York
- The Dakota Jazz Club - Minneapolis
- The Green Mill - Chicago
- The Jazz Kitchen - Indianapolis
- The Air Berlin Summer of Jazz Series – Germany
- Kennedy Center - Washington DC
- Sitka Jazz Festival - Sitka, Alaska
- North Sea Jazz Festival - Rotterdam, Holland
- Jazz à Vienne Jazz Festival - Vienne, France
- The San Javier Jazz Festival - San Javier, Spain
- Ascona Jazz Festival - Switzerland
- Tanglewood Jazz Festival - Lenox, MA
- Fox Jazz Fest 2005 - Menasha, WI

== Artists worked with (partial list) ==
- Aaron Goldberg
- Reuben Rogers
- Eric Harland
- Peter Bernstein
- Robert Hurst
- Cyrus Chestnut
- Matt Wilson
- Randy Brecker
- Javon Jackson
- Larry Goldings
- James Moody
- Kevin Mahogany
- Bernard Purdie
- Eric Harland
- Red Holloway
- Reuben Wilson
- Donald Vega
- Ben Wolfe
- Eric Marienthal
- Mitch Ryder
- Chuck Findley

== Discography ==
| Year | Single or individual cut off a compilation | Album | Primary artist Lead singer Background Singer Composer | Type | Label | Billboard | U.S. | U.K. | Review Rating |
|---|---|---|---|---|---|---|---|---|---|
| 1980 | | Wide Receiver | background singer with Michael Henderson | Studio | Buddah | Pop Albums #35 | | | |
| 1981 | | Party In Me | composer/lyrics with Gene Dunlap | Studio | Capitol | | | | Allmusic |
| 1981 | | Was (Not Was) | background singer with Was (Not Was) | Studio | ZE, Island | | | | Allmusic |
| 1982 | | Don't Walk Away | background singer with Sweet Pea Atkinson | Studio | ZE, Island | | | | Allmusic |
| 1983 | | Born To Laugh At Tornadoes | background singer with Was (Not Was) | Studio | Geffen | Pop Albums #134 | | | Rolling Stone |
| 1983 | | Panic In Detroit | Background singer with Pleasure Circuit | Studio | Tight; Records | | | | |
| 1983 | You Shook Me All Night Long | | Lead singer with Slingshot | Studio | Quality | | | | |
| 1984 | Breathless | | Background singer with Figures on a Beach | Studio | Metro-America | | | | |
| 1984 | | Into The Hot | Background singer with Floy Joy | Studio | Virgin | | | | New Zealand; Album Chart #40 |
| 1985 | T.V. Scene | | Background singer with Linda Di Franco | Studio | WEA | | | | |
| 1986 | | The Rise Of The Heart | Background singer with Linda Di Franco | Studio | Korova | | | | |
| 1987 | I've Got The Night Off | | Primary artist | Studio | Carrere | | | | |
| 1988 | | What Up, Dog? | background singer with Was (Not Was) | Studio | Chrysalis | Pop Albums #43 | | UK Album Charts #47 | Rolling Stone |
| 1992 | Let Your Mind Do The Lovin | Rhonda Clark | Background singer/composer with Rhonda Clark | Studio | Tabu | | | | |
| 1995 | | All in a dream's work...a collection of new standards | Primary artist | Studio | Schoolkids' Records | | | | top 20; Gavin Report |
| 1996 | | Jazz and World Music Vol. 4 (compilation) | Primary artist | Studio | Planet Music | | | | |
| 2002 | | Mood Swings | Primary artist | Studio | Chiaroscuro | | Peaked JazzWeek April 26, 2002 #44 | | Allmusic |
| 2005 | | Vintage | Primary artist | Studio | Mahogany Jazz | | Peaked JazzWeek June 15, 2005 #33 | | Allmusic |
| 2007 | Party In Me; Gene Dunlap | Capitol Disco (compilation) | composer | Studio | Capitol | | | | |
| 2012 | | To The Ladies Of Cool | Primary Artist | Studio | Resonance | | Peaked JazzWeek June 4, 2012 #47 | | Allmusic |
| 2013 | | The Space In Between | Primary Artist | Studio | Mahogany Jazz | | Peaked JazzWeek October 7, 2013 #31 | | |

== See also ==
- Was (Not Was) (album)
- Born to Laugh at Tornadoes (album)
- What Up, Dog? (album)
- "Until You Come Back to Me" (song)
- "Operator" (song)
