= What Up, Dog? =

Studio album by Was (Not Was)
- Released: March 1988
- Recorded: 1984–1988
- Studios: The Institute of Social Disorder (Los Angeles, California, USA); The Town House, Sarm West Studios and Sound Suite (London, UK)
- Genres: Pop rock, pop, funk, R&B, dance, rock, soul
- Length: 57:07; 52:17 (UK)
- Labels: Chrysalis (US); Fontana/Phonogram (UK)
- Producers: David Was; Don Was; Paul Staveley O'Duffy; Stevie Salas

Was (Not Was) chronology
Born to Laugh at Tornadoes (1983)	What Up, Dog? (1988)	Are You Okay? (1990)

Singles from What Up, Dog?
- 1. "Robot Girl" b/w "Earth to Doris" Released: September 1986; 2. "Spy in the House of Love" b/w "Dad I'm in Jail" Released: July 1987; 3. "Walk the Dinosaur" b/w "11 Miles An Hour (Abe Zapp Ruder Version)" Released: 1987; 4. "Boy's Gone Crazy" b/w "What Up, Dog?" Released: November 1987; 5. "Out Come the Freaks (Again)" b/w "Earth To Doris" Released: May 1988; 6. "Anything Can Happen" b/w "The Death Of Mr. Ping Pong" Released: 1988

What Up, Dog? is the third studio album by Was (Not Was). It became the group's breakthrough album worldwide and was ranked #99 on the Rolling Stone magazine's list of the 100 Best Albums of the 1980s. The cover illustration was credited to Christoph Simon and Karen Kelly.

== Background ==
Success of What Up, Dog? was propelled by the group's two biggest hits: "Walk the Dinosaur" and "Spy in the House of Love" and four other singles. The former was promoted by a popular music video in which the band performed while a group of girls in campy cave girl costumes danced. The video received heavy rotation on MTV and MuchMusic and led the single into the top ten of the US singles chart in 1989. Artist/animator Christoph Simon created videos to accompany the tracks "What Up, Dog?", "Dad I'm in Jail" and the Tom Waits-style "Earth to Doris". These appeared on MTV's Liquid Television and in various film festivals, including the Spike & Mike festival.

The album had fewer guest vocalists than their previous album and instead was focused around the group's two lead singers, Sweet Pea Atkinson and Sir Harry Bowens. However, a typically long list of collaborators and guest musicians worked on the album including Elvis Costello (co-writer of "Shadow & Jimmy"), Marshall Crenshaw (co-writer of "Love Can Be Bad Luck"), and Frank Sinatra Jr. on "Wedding Vows in Vegas". It also included the second re-recording of the group's signature song: "Out Come the Freaks".

== Release ==
What Up, Dog? became the group's breakthrough album in the US and worldwide. It reached #43 on the Billboard 200 album chart, #41 in New Zealand, and #47 in the UK. The album also spawned six singles (seven if the re-release of "Spy in the House of Love" is counted). The biggest hit was "Walk the Dinosaur" which charted worldwide and hit the top 10 in the US and UK. "Spy in the House of Love" was very popular too, hitting the top 20 in the US, #21 in the UK and peaking at #1 on the Billboard Hot Dance Club Play chart. "Anything Can Happen" was the third and final single to chart on the Billboard Hot 100 chart reaching #75. In the UK, "Robot Girl", "Boy's Gone Crazy" and "Out Come the Freaks" (alternately re-titled "Out Come the Freaks (Again)" and "(Stuck Inside Of Detroit With The) Out Come The Freaks (Again)") reached modest positions on the charts. In 1992, "Somewhere in America There's a Street Named After My Dad" was released as a single to promote the group's compilation Hello Dad... I'm in Jail.

US and International versions of the album featured different running orders and varying versions of the songs. Notably, "11 MPH" on the US edition was remixed and "Robot Girl" was a slightly different and shorter mix. The International CDs and LPs did not include David Was's jazzy monologue "Earth to Doris". LP versions in both countries do not include "Robot Girl", "Wedding Vows in Vegas" and "I Can't Turn You Loose", but have differing running orders.

== Reception ==
Professional ratings
Review scores
Source	Rating
AllMusic	4.5/5 stars
Encyclopedia of Popular Music	4/5 stars
Los Angeles Times	3/4 stars
Rolling Stone	4/5 stars
The Village Voice	A−

In 1989, it was ranked #99 on Rolling Stone magazine's list of the 100 Greatest Albums of the '80s.

== Track listings ==
=== US and Japan CD and Cassette (Chrysalis) ===
The Chrysalis edition of the album features the largest number of tracks, but includes a shorter mix of "Robot Girl" by Dave Dachinger and the Abe Zapp Ruder Version of "11 MPH" instead of the original recording.

All tracks are written by David Was and Don Was; except where indicated.

No.	Title	Writer(s)	Length
1.	"Somewhere in America There's a Street Named After My Dad"		3:42
2.	"Spy in the House of Love"		4:18
3.	"Out Come the Freaks"		4:36
4.	"Earth to Doris"		2:03
5.	"Love Can Be Bad Luck"	David Was, Marshall Crenshaw, Don Was	3:52
6.	"Boy's Gone Crazy"		3:44
7.	"11 MPH (Abe Zapp Ruder Version)"		4:05
8.	"What Up, Dog?"	David Was, Don Was, Harry Bowens, Sweet Pea Atkinson	1:48
9.	"Anything Can Happen"	David Was, Don Was, Aaron Zigman	3:57
10.	"Robot Girl" (Final mix: Dave Dachinger)		3:48
11.	"Wedding Vows in Vegas"		3:38
12.	"Anytime Lisa"		4:15
13.	"Walk the Dinosaur"	David Was, Don Was, Randy Jacobs	4:22
14.	"I Can't Turn You Loose"	Otis Redding	3:37
15.	"Shadow and Jimmy"	David Was, Elvis Costello	4:18
16.	"Dad I'm in Jail"		1:25

=== International CD and Cassette (Fontana) ===
Fontana Records' international editions do not feature "Earth to Doris", which was previously released as the b-side of "Robot Girl". The original John Potoker mix of "11 Miles An Hour" appears.

No.	Title	Writer(s)	Length
1.	"Spy in the House of Love"		4:18
2.	"Boy's Gone Crazy"		3:44
3.	"Anything Can Happen"	David Was, Don Was, Aaron Zigman	3:57
4.	"Out Come the Freaks"		4:36
5.	"Somewhere in America There's a Street Named After My Dad"		3:42
6.	"Love Can Be Bad Luck"	David Was, Marshall Crenshaw, Don Was	3:52
7.	"Shadow and Jimmy"	David Was, Elvis Costello	4:18
8.	"11 Miles An Hour" (Final mix: John Potoker)		4:05
9.	"Robot Girl" (Final mix: John Potoker, aka 'London Mix')		4:11
10.	"What Up, Dog?"	David Was, Don Was, Harry Bowens, Sweet Pea Atkinson	1:48
11.	"Anytime Lisa"		4:15
12.	"Wedding Vows in Vegas"		3:38
13.	"Walk the Dinosaur"	David Was, Don Was, Randy Jacobs	4:22
14.	"I Can't Turn You Loose"	Otis Redding	3:37
15.	"Dad I'm in Jail"		1:25

=== US LP (Chrysalis) ===
The US LP is a condensed version of the CD, omitting the tracks "Robot Girl", "Wedding Vows in Vegas", and "I Can't Turn You Loose".

Side one
No.	Title	Writer(s)	Length
1.	"Somewhere in America There's a Street Named After My Dad"		3:42
2.	"Spy in the House of Love"		4:18
3.	"Out Come the Freaks"		4:36
4.	"Earth to Doris"		2:03
5.	"Anything Can Happen"	David Was, Don Was, Aaron Zigman	3:57
6.	"Boy's Gone Crazy"		3:44
7.	"What Up, Dog?"	David Was, Don Was, Harry Bowens, Sweet Pea Atkinson	1:48

Side two
No.	Title	Writer(s)	Length
8.	"Love Can Be Bad Luck"	David Was, Marshall Crenshaw, Don Was	3:52
9.	"Walk the Dinosaur"	David Was, Don Was, Randy Jacobs	4:22
10.	"Shadow and Jimmy"	David Was, Elvis Costello	4:18
11.	"11 MPH (Abe Zapp Ruder Version)"		4:05
12.	"Anytime Lisa"		4:15
13.	"Dad I'm in Jail"		1:25

=== International LP (Fontana) ===
The International LP features the same tracks as the US LP, with the exception of the original John Potoker mix of "11 Miles An Hour" appearing instead and "Earth to Doris" not appearing at all.

Side one
No.	Title	Writer(s)	Length
1.	"Spy in the House of Love"		4:18
2.	"Boy's Gone Crazy"		3:44
3.	"Anything Can Happen"	David Was, Don Was, Aaron Zigman	3:57
4.	"Somewhere in America There's a Street Named After My Dad"		3:42
5.	"Out Come the Freaks"		4:36
6.	"What Up, Dog?"	David Was, Don Was, Harry Bowens, Sweet Pea Atkinson	1:48

Side two
No.	Title	Writer(s)	Length
7.	"Love Can Be Bad Luck"	David Was, Marshall Crenshaw, Don Was	3:52
8.	"11 Miles An Hour" (Final mix: John Potoker)		4:05
9.	"Anytime Lisa"		4:15
10.	"Shadow and Jimmy"	David Was, Elvis Costello	4:18
11.	"Walk the Dinosaur"	David Was, Don Was, Randy Jacobs	4:22
12.	"Dad I'm in Jail"		1:25

== Personnel ==
Was (Not Was)

- David Was – keyboards, flute, harmonica, vocals
- Don Was – keyboards, guitars, mandolin, bass
- Sweet Pea Atkinson – lead vocals, backing vocals
- Sir Harry Bowens – lead vocals, backing vocals, BGV arrangements

Additional musicians and vocals

- Vic Emerson, Amp Fiddler, Al Kooper, Martyn Phillips, Luis Resto, Daniel Schroeger, Robin Smith, John Van Tongeren, Paul Wickens and Aaron Zigman – keyboards
- Dann Huff, Paul Jackson, Jr., Randy Jacobs, Bruce Nazarian and Stevie Salas – guitars
- Marcus Miller, John Patitucci and Neil Stubenhaus – bass guitar
- Yogi Horton, Russ Kunkel, Ron Pangborn and Winston Watson – drums
- Alex Acuña, Debra Dobkin, Michael Fisher, Larry Fratangelo, David Friendly, Frank Ricotti, Carl "Butch" Small and Kevin "Guido" Tschirhart – percussion
- Dan Higgins, Kim Hutchcroft, Phil Todd, Larry Williams, Pete Beachill, Bill Reichenbach Jr., John Barclay, Guy Barker, Stuart Brooks, Jerry Hey and John Thirkell – brass section
- David McMurray, John "Birch" Weiss, Chris "Snake" Davies, and Larry Williams – saxophones
- Marcus Belgrave, Rayse Biggs, Oscar Brashear, Buddy Childers and Mark Isham – trumpet
- Richard Niles – horn and string arrangements (2, 9)
- Paul Riser – horn and string arrangements (5, 7, 12, 15)
- Luis Resto – horn arrangements (13)
- Louis Fagenson – string arrangements (13)
- Desny Campbell, Richard Feldstein, Geoff Fieger, Coral Gordon, Carol Hall, Kathy Kosins, Allen Lenard, Dee Lewis, Arthur "Buster" Marbury, Arnold McCuller, Donald Ray Mitchell, Juliet Roberts, Rick Shoemaker, Pete Steinfeld, Helen Terry and Ruby Turner – backing vocals
- Frank Sinatra Jr. – guest vocals on "Wedding Vows in Vegas"

== Production ==
- David Bates, Gemma Corfield, Jack Leitenberg and Michael Zilkha – executive producers
- John Lewis and Jack Tann – associate producers
- Peter Barker, Mike Bosley, Michael H. Brauer, Steve Chase, Lincoln Clapp, Croyden Cooke, David Dachinger, Phil Da Costa, Roland Herrington, Chris Irwin, Steve King, Troy Krueger, Paul Staveley O'Duffy, Tom O'Leary, Mike Pela, Martyn Phillips John Potoker, Micajah Ryan, Allen Sides, Kevin W. Smith, Don Was and Paul Wright – engineers
- Paul Staveley O'Duffy, John Potoker, Allen Sides, David Was and Don Was – mixing
- Jack "Jacko" Adams – mastering at Tape One (London, UK)
- Calli Bucci, Garzelle McDonald and Margaret Mittleman – production coordination
- Jon and Vicky (The Unknown Partnership) – sleeve art direction
- John Heiden – inner sleeve design
- Karen Kelly and Christoph Simon – illustration
- David Passick and Ken Kushnick – management

== Charts ==
Chart (1988–89)	Peak position
Canada Top Albums/CDs (RPM)	90
Dutch Albums (Album Top 100)	57
New Zealand Albums (RMNZ)	41
UK Albums (Official Charts)	47
US Billboard 200	43
