= Born to Laugh at Tornadoes =

Studio album by Was (Not Was)
- Released: September 1983
- Recorded: November 1982–June 1983
- Studios: Sound Suite Recording Studios and Gnome Sound (Detroit, Michigan): Record Plant, Mediasound Studios, 39th Street Music Studio and Sigma Sound (New York City, New York); Criteria Studios (Miami, Florida)
- Length: 35:31
- Labels: ZE, Geffen
- Producers: Jack Tann: David Was; Don Was

Was (Not Was) chronology
| Was (Not Was) (1981) | Born to Laugh at Tornadoes (1983) | What Up, Dog? (1988) |

Professional ratings
Review scores
| Source | Rating |
|---|---|
| Allmusic | link |
| Robert Christgau | B+ |
| Rolling Stone | link |

Born to Laugh at Tornadoes is a 1983 album by the art-funk band Was (Not Was). Rolling Stone declared it "conceptually, the best album of the year" shortly after its release. Despite the glowing reviews, Tornadoes made little commercial impact in a year dominated by Michael Jackson's Thriller and Prince's 1999. (It did manage to become the band's first release to make it onto Billboard's album chart, peaking at #134 in a nine-week stay in the fall of 1983.)

This album boasted an impressive array of guest vocalists, ranging from hard rocker Mitch Ryder (on "Bow Wow Wow Wow"), former Black Sabbath vocalist Ozzy Osbourne ("Shake Your Head"), rock band The Knack's lead vocalist Doug Fieger (on "Betrayal" and "Smile") and torch song vocalist/songwriter Mel Tormé (lead vocal on the closing song "Zaz Turned Blue").

The album also displayed a wide variety of musical styles, ranging from pop love ballads ("Betrayal") to rock ("Bow Wow Wow Wow"), psychedelic synthesized mod music ("Man Vs. The Empire Brain Building") and even easy listening cocktail jazz ("Zaz Turned Blue", a ballad about a man who nearly chokes to death in a park).

Also noteworthy is a credit to Robert Kinkel as Assistant Engineer; Kinkel went on to be co-creator of the Trans-Siberian Orchestra. The front cover illustration, "After Compton's", was credited to Dan Chapman in 1953 and Jeri McManus was the art director.

== Track listing ==
All tracks are written by David Was and Don Was; except where indicated.

Side one
| No. | Title | Writer(s) | Lead vocals | Length |
|---|---|---|---|---|
| 1. | "Knocked Down, Made Small (Treated Like a Rubber Ball)" | | Sweet Pea Atkinson | 3:07 |
| 2. | "Bow Wow Wow Wow" | Thomas Brzezina | Mitch Ryder | 3:10 |
| 3. | "Betrayal" | | Doug Fieger | 3:06 |
| 4. | "Shake Your Head (Let's Go to Bed)" | David Was, Don Was, Jarvis Stroud | Carol Hall, Ozzy Osbourne | 3:55 |
| 5. | "Man vs. the Empire Brain Building" | | Ada Griffin, Carol Hall, Chris Blackwell, Felix & Jarvis, The Was Bros. | 4:02 |

Side two
| No. | Title | Writer(s) | Lead vocals | Length |
|---|---|---|---|---|
| 6. | "(Return to The Valley of) Out Come the Freaks" | | Harry Bowens | 4:22 |
| 7. | "Professor Night" | David Was, Don Was, Felix Morris | Harry Bowens | 4:10 |
| 8. | "The Party Broke Up" | | David Was | 2:14 |
| 9. | "Smile" | | Doug Fieger | 3:15 |
| 10. | "Zaz Turned Blue" | | Mel Tormé | 4:19 |

== Personnel ==
=== Musicians ===
- David Was – flute (3, 5, 6), trumpet (5), Korg organ (6), vibraphone (8), harmonica (8)
- Don Was – Oberheim OB-SX (1–3, 7, 9), clavinet (1), LinnDrum (2–6, 8), E-mu Emulator (3, 5, 8), bass (3), Oberheim OB-Xa (4), Simmons drums (4), synthesizers (5), timpani (5, 6), cello (5, 8), Moog bass (8), sea bells (8), rhythm guitar (9), bass drums (9), Oberheim bells (10)
- Luis Resto – Moog synthesizer (1, 2, 4), Oberheim OB-Xa (1, 2, 4, 5, 7), acoustic piano (2, 3, 5, 9), organ (2), vocoder (4), Moog bass (5, 7), synthetic trumpet (6), E-mu Emulator (10)
- John Robie – Moog synthesizer (1), Prophet-5 (1)
- Analisa Trajano – Oberheim bells (3)
- Fred Zarr – acoustic piano (6), synthesizers (6)
- Marshall Crenshaw – organ (8), vocal percussion (8), lead guitar (9)
- Mike Renzi – acoustic piano (10), arrangements and conductor (10)
- Bruce Nazarian – guitars (1–3)
- Roscoe Paradise – guitars (2)
- Joseph LoDuca – guitars (3)
- Randy Jacobs – guitars (4, 5, 7), bass guitar (5)
- Wayne Kramer – guitars (8)
- Vinnie Vincent – second lead guitar (9)
- Bob Kulick – "power chord" guitar (9)
- Jervonny Collier – bass guitar (1)
- Red Banner – bass guitar (2)
- Felix Morris – Moog bass (4), bass guitar (7)
- Jay Leonhart – bass guitar (10)
- Yogi Horton – drums (1, 3, 7)
- Reggie Mocambo – Simmons drums (2)
- Tom Swift – cymbals (2)
- Mike "Smitt E. Smitty" Smith – Simmons toms (7)
- Anthony Was – rhythm matrix (8)
- Nicholas Was – rhythm matrix (8)
- Larry Fratangelo – percussion (4, 6)
- Dave McMurray – saxophones (2, 4), sax solo (3), soprano saxophone (6), tenor saxophone (6)
- Branford Marsalis – sax solo on fade (3)
- Marvin Peterson – trumpet stylings (5)
- Paul Riser – horn and string arrangements on "Knocked Down", "Made Small (Treated Like a Rubber Ball)"

String Fever on "Zaz Turned Blue"

- Beverly Laurisden – cello
- Jill Jaffe – viola
- Carol Poole-Gross – violin
- Marin Alsop – violin

=== Vocals ===
- Sweet Pea Atkinson – lead vocals (1), backing vocals (2, 5)
- Sir Harry Bowens – backing vocals (1, 5–7), lead vocals (6, 7)
- Carol Hall – backing vocals (1, 2, 4, 5, 7, 9), vocals (4), lead vocals (5)
- Kathy Kosins – backing vocals (1, 2, 4, 5, 7, 9), vocals (4)
- Donald Ray Mitchell – backing vocals (1, 5, 7)
- David Was – backing vocals (1, 2, 6, 7, 9), lead vocals (5, 8)
- Mitch Ryder – vocals (2)
- Christopher Ewen – backing vocals (2)
- Lynn Halper – backing vocals (2, 9)
- Lamont Zodiac – backing vocals (2)
- Doug Fieger – vocals (3, 9), backing vocals (9)
- Ozzy Osbourne – vocals (4)
- Randy Jacobs – backing vocals (4)
- Luis Resto – backing vocals (4)
- "Puppet" Blum – backing vocals (4)
- "Professor" Goss – backing vocals (4)
- Chris Blackwell – lead vocals [the caller from London] (5)
- Ada Griffin – lead vocals (5)
- Felix Morris – lead vocals (5)
- Jarvis Stroud – lead vocals (5)
- Don Was – lead vocals (5), backing vocals (6)
- Pam Brown – backing vocals (5)
- Nikki Corvette – backing vocals (5)
- Peter James – backing vocals [ooh wah ooh] (5)
- Lori Jeri – backing vocals [ooh wah ooh] (5)
- Anthony Kaczynski – backing vocals (5)
- Valerie Ledbetter – backing vocals (5)
- Dave McMurray – backing vocals (5)
- Mark J. Norton – backing vocals (5)
- John Sinclair – backing vocals (5)
- Susan Borey – backing vocals (9)
- Rick Cioffi – backing vocals (9)
- Fred Todd – backing vocals (9)
- Mel Tormé – vocals (10)

The Wasquarium Foot Choir on "Man vs. The Empire Brain Building"

- Duane Bradley, Michael Edwards, Randy Jacobs, Larry Provost, Christine Reeves and Evelyn Werner

== Production ==
- Michael Zilkha – executive producer
- Jack Tann – producer
- David Was – producer
- Don Was – producer
- Debbie Caponetta – production coordination
- Jeri McManus – album design
- Dan Chapman – cover illustration
- Larry Williams – back cover photography
- Vicki Johnson-Was – liner photography

=== Technical ===
- Greg Fulginiti – mastering at Artisan Sound Recorders (North Hollywood, California)
- David Thoener – mixing (1, 2, 4–8)
- The Detroit Wasmopolitan Mixing Squad (Duane Bradley, Ken Collier and Don Was) – mixing (3, 9, 10)
- Don Was – recording engineer
- Michael H. Brauer – drum engineer (1, 3, 7)
- Mike Brown – assistant engineer
- Warren Woods – assistant engineer

Overdub engineers

- Michael H. Brauer, Lincoln Clapp, Mike Fuller, Steven Guardigli, Gregg Mann, Jay Mark, Jon Mathias, Bruce Nazarian, Jerry Thichava, David Thoener and Gretchen Williamson
- Jim Ball, Carol Cafiero, Michael Christopher, Mark Cobrin, Robert Kinkel, Tom Swift and Melanie West – assistants
