= Yogi Horton =

American drummer (1953–1987)

- Born: Lawrence Horton; October 1, 1953
- Died: June 8, 1987 (aged 33)
- Genres: R&B; funk; jazz; rock
- Occupation: Drummer
- Instruments: Drums, backing vocals
- Years active: 1972–1987
- Formerly of: Aretha Franklin, Luther Vandross, John Lennon, Yoko Ono, Ashford & Simpson, David Byrne, Deborah Harry, Hall & Oates, Diana Ross, Kenny G, The B-52's, Jean-Michel Jarre

Lawrence "Yogi" Horton (October 1, 1953 – June 8, 1987) was an American R&B, funk, jazz and rock drummer. Horton worked and recorded as a session and touring drummer with a wide variety of musicians such as Aretha Franklin, Luther Vandross, John Lennon, Yoko Ono, Ashford & Simpson, David Byrne, Deborah Harry, Hall & Oates, Diana Ross, Kenny G, The B-52's, and Jean-Michel Jarre among numerous others. His first recording was on Dave "Baby" Cortez's 1972 album Soul Vibration.

Horton recorded an instructional videocassette in 1983, which was released by DCI. Titled "The History of R&B/Funk Drumming", it is considered to be "one of the first instructional type videos of its kind." The video is long out of print, but can still be viewed on YouTube as of March 2021.

Horton, who suffered from bipolar disorder, died on June 8, 1987, when he jumped from a 17th-floor hotel window in New York shortly after performing in a Luther Vandross concert. Was (Not Was) dedicated their 1988 album What Up, Dog? to Horton; he performed on the album and it was released after his death.

== Discography ==
With David Byrne

- The Catherine Wheel (Sire Records, 1981)

With Lonnie Liston Smith

- Dreams of Tomorrow (Doctor Jazz, 1983)

With Gloria Gaynor

- Gloria Gaynor (Atlantic Records, 1982)

With Irene Cara

- Anyone Can See (Network Records, 1982)

With John Lennon and Yoko Ono

- Milk and Honey (Geffen, 1984)

With George Benson

- While the City Sleeps... (Warner Bros. Records, 1986)

With Linda Clifford

- I'll Keep on Loving You (Capitol, 1982)

With Ben E. King

- Street Tough (Atlantic Records, 1981)

With Cheryl Lynn

- Instant Love (Columbia Records, 1982)
- Preppie (Columbia Records, 1983)

With Aretha Franklin

- Jump to It (Arista Records, 1982)
- Get It Right (Arista Records, 1983)
- Who's Zoomin' Who? (Arista Records, 1985)
- Aretha (Arista Records, 1986)
- Through the Storm (Arista Records, 1989)

With Yoko Ono

- It's Alright (I See Rainbows) (Polygram Records, 1982)

With Jean Michel Jarre

- Zoolook (Disques Dreyfus, 1984)

With John Phillips

- Pay Pack & Follow (Eagle Records, 2001)

With Stephanie Mills

- Tantalizingly Hot (Casablanca Records, 1982)
- If I Were Your Woman (MCA Records, 1987)

With Was (Not Was)

- Born To Laugh At Tornadoes (Chrysalis Records, 1983)
- What Up, Dog? (Chrysalis Records, 1988)
