= Are You Okay? =

- Original album artwork by Mark Ryden

Studio album by Was (Not Was)
- Released: 1990
- Studios: The Institute of Social Disruption, Microplant and Record Plant (Los Angeles, California); Hollywood Sound Recorders and Studio 56 (Hollywood, California); Larrabee Sound Studios (North Hollywood, California); JHL Sound (Pacific Palisades, California); Smoketree Ranch (Chatsworth, California); Matrix Studios (London, UK)
- Genres: Funk, soul, pop, rock
- Length: 49:56
- Labels: Fontana (UK) - Licensed from Phonogram; Chrysalis (USA)
- Producers: David Was, Don Was

Was (Not Was) chronology
What Up, Dog? (1988)	Are You Okay? (1990)	Hello Dad... I'm in Jail (1992)

Singles from Are You Okay?
- 1. "Papa Was a Rollin' Stone" Released: 1990; 2. "How the Heart Behaves" Released: 1990; 3. "I Feel Better Than James Brown" Released: 1990

Professional ratings
Review scores
Source	Rating
AllMusic	3/5 stars
Chicago Sun-Times	4/4 stars
Chicago Tribune	3/4 stars
Entertainment Weekly	C+
Los Angeles Times	4/5 stars
NME	9/10
Q	4/5 stars
Rolling Stone	4/5 stars
Select	5/5
The Village Voice	A−

Are You Okay? is the fourth album by art-funk ensemble Was (Not Was). It was released in 1990. It was their last album for 18 years until 2008's Boo!

In UK and Europe, the album cover is replaced with a picture of the band.

== Track listing ==
All tracks composed by David Was and Don Was; except where indicated.

1. "Are You Okay?" – 4:28
2. "Papa Was a Rollin' Stone" (Barrett Strong, Norman Whitfield) – 6:41
3. "I Feel Better Than James Brown" – 4:45
4. "How the Heart Behaves" – 5:35
5. "Maria Novarro" – 3:27
6. "I Blew Up the United States" – 3:51
7. "In K Mart Wardrobe" – 4:16
8. "Elvis' Rolls Royce" – 3:29
9. "Dressed to Be Killed" (Was, Was, G Love E)– 4:13
10. "Just Another Couple Broken Hearts" – 4:55
11. "You! You! You!" (Was, Was, Luis Resto) – 3:28
12. "Look What's Back" – 0:43

== Personnel ==
Was (Not Was)

- David Was – keyboards, flute, vocals
- Don Was – keyboards, bass
- Sweet Pea Atkinson – vocals
- Sir Harry Bowens – vocals
- Donald Ray Mitchell – vocals
- Jamie Muhoberac – keyboards
- Randy Jacobs – guitars
- Ron Pangborn – drums
- Debra Dobkin – percussion, vocals
- Dave McMurray – saxophones
- Rayse Biggs – trumpet

Guest vocalists

- G Love E – rap (1, 2, 9)
- The Roches – vocals (5)
- Doug Fieger – backing vocals (6, 9)
- Leonard Cohen – lead vocals (8)
- Iggy Pop, Downtown Julie Brown and Ewreck Benson – backing vocals (8)
- Andy Gill – backing vocals (9)
- Syd Straw – lead vocals (11)

Guest musicians

- Jeff Lorber – keyboards, keyboard programming and keyboard arrangements (1, 3, 4, 7, 10)
- Brad Buxer – additional keyboards (4)
- Luis Resto – keyboards (11)
- Paul Riser – horn and string arrangements (4, 8, 10)
- Jon Jaz-Was – saxophonic reticulation

== Production ==
- David Bates – executive producer
- David Was – producer
- Don Was – producer, engineer
- Keith Cohen – mixing (1, 2, 4–7, 9), additional production (4)
- Ed Cherney – engineer, mixing (3, 8, 10, 11)
- Steve Deutsch – engineer
- Kenny Jones – engineer
- Jeff Lorber – engineer
- Elaine Anderson – assistant engineer
- Andy Batwinas – assistant engineer
- Kimm James – assistant engineer
- Brian Jones – assistant engineer
- Jim Mitchell – assistant engineer
- Linda Morse – assistant engineer
- Jeff Park – assistant engineer
- Neal Pogue – assistant engineer
- Martin Schmelzle – assistant engineer
- Phonogram Art – art direction
- Green Ink – artwork
- Tim Whiteley – paintbox operator
- Kushnick Passett Management – management

== Charts ==
Chart (1990)	Peak position
Australian Albums (ARIA)	107
US Billboard 200	99
