= Walk the Dinosaur =

Single by Was (Not Was)

from the album What Up, Dog?
- B-side: "11 Miles An Hour (Abe Zapp Ruder Version)" (Europe) "Wedding Vows In Vegas" (US)
- Released: 1987
- Genre: Funk
- Length: 4:22 (album version); 3:40 (single edit)
- Label: Chrysalis (US); Fontana/Phonogram (UK)
- Songwriters: David Was; Don Was; Randy Jacobs
- Producers: David Was; Don Was

Was (Not Was) singles chronology
"Spy in the House of Love" (1987)	"Walk the Dinosaur" (1987)	"The Boy's Gone Crazy" (1987)

"Walk the Dinosaur" is a song by Was (Not Was), released in 1987, from their album What Up, Dog?

== Song info ==
The tune features a tight, funky sound, punctuated by horns and a cowbell.

When released in the UK in 1987, the song reached No. 10 on the singles chart, becoming the group's first UK top 10 hit. The music video features four scantily clad 'cavewomen' dancing while a Flintstones-style TV plays clips from Daffy Duck and the Dinosaur. Towards the end of the video, a group of modern-day humans dance to the song's chorus. The video received heavy rotation on MTV. The song reached No. 7 on the US chart on April 1, 1989, two years after its UK success and became the band's biggest hit single in their home country.

According to an interview with co-writer Randy Jacobs, "the song's about nuclear Armageddon. It became a dance because of the video. They connected it with the girls in the little Pebbles and Bamm-Bamm outfits. All the sudden it became, like, 'do the mashed potato' or 'the twist.'"

== Track listing ==
7" vinyl

1. "Walk the Dinosaur" – 3:38
2. "11 Miles an Hour (Abe Zapp Ruder Version)" – 4:04

7" vinyl / Cassette (US)

1. "Walk the Dinosaur" – 3:38
2. "Wedding Vows in Vegas" – 3:38

12" vinyl (1) / CD (1) (Europe)

1. "Walk the Dinosaur (The New York Dangerous Mix)" – 6:58
2. "Walk the Dinosaur (Bruce's Prehistoric Dub)" – 6:43
3. "11 Miles an Hour (Abe Zapp Ruder Version)" – 4:04

12" vinyl (2) (UK)

1. "Walk the Dinosaur (Jeffrey B. Young Hearts Run Free Remix)" – 6:08
2. "Walk the Dinosaur (A-Cappella Saurus)" – 3:46
3. "Walk the Dinosaur (Full Instrumental)" – 5:03
4. "11 Miles an Hour (Abe Zapp Ruder Version)" – 4:04

12" vinyl (US)

1. "Walk the Dinosaur (The New York Dangerous Version)" – 6:58
2. "Walk the Dinosaur (Bruce's Prehistoric Dub)" – 6:43
3. "Walk the Dinosaur (The Debunking Of Uri Geller Mix)" – 4:30
4. "Walk the Dinosaur (7" Version)" – 3:38

CDV (2) (Europe)

1. "Walk the Dinosaur (Jeffrey B. Young Hearts Run Free Remix)" – 6:08
2. "Walk the Dinosaur (A-Cappella Saurus)" – 3:46
3. "Walk the Dinosaur (Full Instrumental)" – 5:03
4. "11 Miles an Hour (Abe Zapp Ruder Version)" – 4:03
5. "Walk the Dinosaur (video)" – 3:36

== Remixes ==
1. "7" Version" – 3:38
2. "The New York Dangerous Mix" – 6:58 – remixed by Bruce Forest.
3. "Bruce's Prehistoric Dub" – 6:43 – remixed by Bruce Forest.
4. "Jeffrey B. Young Hearts Run Free Remix" – 6:08 – remixed by Jeff Young.
5. "A-Cappella Saurus" – 3:46 – mixed by Bruce Forest and Frank Heller.
6. "Full Instrumental" – 5:03 – mixed by Bruce Forest and Frank Heller.
7. "The Debunking of Uri Geller Mix" – 4:30 mixed by Don Was and Jamie Muhoberac.

== Charts ==
=== Weekly charts ===
Chart (1987–1989)	Peak position
Australia (Kent Music Report)	9
Belgium (Ultratop 50 Flanders)	16
Canada Top Singles (RPM)	6
Canada 30 Retail Singles (RPM)	5
Europe (European Hot 100 Singles)	27
France (SNEP)	49
Ireland (IRMA)	11
Italy Airplay (Music & Media)	7
Netherlands (Dutch Top 40)	11
Netherlands (Single Top 100)	10
New Zealand (Recorded Music NZ)	16
Norway (VG-lista)	6
South Africa (Springbok Radio)	10
Switzerland (Schweizer Hitparade)	9
UK Singles (Official Charts)	10
US Billboard Hot 100	7
US Billboard Hot Dance Club Play	11
US Billboard Hot Dance Music/Maxi-Singles Sales	36
US Billboard Modern Rock Tracks	30
US Cash Box	7
West Germany (GfK)	48

=== Year-end charts ===
Chart (1988)	Position
Australia (Kent Music Report)	72

Chart (1989)	Position
Canada Top Singles (RPM)	70

== In popular culture ==
A version performed by George Clinton appears on the Super Mario Bros. soundtrack in 1993, and is also featured in the credits.

The original recording appears on the soundtrack of the 1994 film The Flintstones.

The song was one of the songs that could be heard playing at the former Dinoland U.S.A. at Disney's Animal Kingdom. It is one of sing-along songs with only a few of the lyrics that have been changed for Flik's Musical Adventure at Disney's Animal Kingdom (1999) from the Disney Sing-Along Songs series. It can also be heard during the Electrical Water Pageant.

The song was heard in TV spots for the 2000 Disney animated film Dinosaur.

In the 20th Century Fox/Blue Sky Studios 2009 animated film Ice Age 3: Dawn of the Dinosaurs, a version of the song by Queen Latifah (the voice of the character Ellie) is featured during the film and the credits. This version featured minor lyrical changes to make the song more family-friendly.
