= Forever's a Long, Long Time =

Studio album by Don Was (d/b/a Orquestra Was)
- Released: April 8, 1997
- Genres: Jazz, R&B
- Length: 53:44
- Label: Verve Forecast

Forever's a Long, Long Time is an album of Hank Williams covers performed by Don Was to Was's own music. Was released the album, under the name Orquestra Was, on April 8, 1997 on Verve Forecast Records. The original CD release of the album also included a short film directed by Was, starring Sweet Pea Atkinson and Kris Kristofferson. The film was nominated for a Grammy Award for Best Long Form Music Video in 1997.

Professional ratings
Review scores
Source	Rating
AllMusic	2.5/5 stars
Entertainment Weekly	B–
Salon	(favorable)
The Village Voice	(dud)
The Washington Post	(mixed)

== Track listing ==
1. Once Upon A Time In Detroit – 1:55
2. I Ain't Got Nothin' But Time – 8:27
3. Never Again (Will I Knock On Your Door) – 3:52
4. Excuse Me, Colonel, Could I Borrow Your Newspaper? – 4:56
5. Detroit In A Time Upon Once – 0:58
6. Forever's A Long, Long Time – 6:50
7. You've Been Having A Rough Night, Huh? – 4:49
8. Lost On The River – 13:04
9. A Big Poem About Hell – 2:48
10. I'm So Tired Of It All – 3:38

== Personnel ==
- Sweet Pea Atkinson – vocals
- Sir Harry Bowens – vocals (background)
- Donald Ray Mitchell – vocals (background)
- Merle Haggard – guitar, vocals
- Herbie Hancock – Fender Rhodes, piano
- Wayne Kramer – guitar
- Terence Blanchard – flugelhorn, trumpet
- Harvey Mason, Sr. – drums
- Sheila E. – percussion
- Was (Not Was) – performer
- Don Was – bass, guitar, keyboards, saxophone
- Bobby Turner – guitar (pedal, lap steel)
- Jamie Muhoberac – keyboards
- Luis Resto– keyboards
- Randy Jacobs– guitar
- Lenny Castro – percussion
- Michito Sanchez– percussion
- Michael Fischer– percussion
- Curt Bisquera– percussion
- Lili Haydn– violin
- David McMurray– saxophone, flute
