= Was (Not Was) (album) =

Studio album by Was (Not Was)
- Released: 1981
- Recorded: January–March 1981
- Studio: Sound Suite (Detroit, Michigan)
- Label: ZE, Island
- Producer: David Was; Don Was; Jack Tann

Was (Not Was) chronology
Was (Not Was) (1981)	Born to Laugh at Tornadoes (1983)

Professional ratings
Review scores
Source	Rating
AllMusic	3.5/5 stars
Robert Christgau	B−

Was (Not Was) is the debut album by art-funk ensemble Was (Not Was); it was released in 1981. The album was re-released with additional material in 2004 under the name Out Come the Freaks. The art direction was by Maverse Players.

== Track listing ==
=== 1981 release ===
All tracks composed by David Was and Don Was; except where indicated

Side A

1. "Out Come the Freaks" – 5:41 vocals - Harry Bowens; spoken vocals - Marzanne McCants
2. "Where Did Your Heart Go?" – 4:55 lead vocals - Sweet Pea Atkinson
3. "Tell Me That I'm Dreaming" – 4:58 lead vocals - Harry Bowens
4. "Oh, Mr. Friction!" – 3:31

Side B

1. "Carry Me Back to Old Morocco" (Was, Was, Doug Fieger) – 6:01
2. "It's an Attack!" (Was, Was, David Goss) – 3:11 lead vocals - Sweet Pea Atkinson
3. "The Sky's Ablaze" – 2:16
4. "Go...Now!" (Was, Was, Ron Banks) – 5:34 lead vocals - Sweet Pea Atkinson

Side B of the LP ends in a lock groove of Atkinson singing "'Cause he says it hurts his neck" (from "Out Come the Freaks"), looping on the last three words.

=== Out Come the Freaks [2004 ZE Records Remastered Edition ZEREC.CD05] ===
1. "Wheel Me Out" (Long Version) – 7:06
2. "Out Come the Freaks" – 5:39
3. "Where Did Your Heart Go?" – 4:57
4. "Tell Me That I'm Dreaming" – 5:00
5. "Oh, Mr. Friction" – 3:33
6. "Carry Me Back to Old Morocco" – 6:01
7. "It's an Attack!" – 3:10
8. "The Sky's Ablaze" – 2:15
9. "Go...Now!" – 5:30
10. "Hello Operator" (Short Version) – 2:51
11. "Out Come the Freaks (Again)" – 4:37
12. "Tell Me That I'm Dreaming" (12" Remix)" – 7:48
13. "Out Come the Freaks" (12" Remix) – 7:10
14. "(Return to the Valley Of) Out Come the Freaks" (Semi/Historic 1983 Version) – 4:20
15. "Christmas Time in Motor City" – 2:55
16. "Out Come the Freaks" (Dub Version) – 6:30

== Personnel ==
- David Was – vocals, acoustic piano, alto saxophone
- Don Was – vocals, Moog synthesizer, clavinet, bass, vibraphone
- Sir Harry Bowens – lead vocals on "Out Come the Freaks" and "Tell Me That I'm Dreaming"
- Sweet Pea Atkinson – lead vocals on "Where Did Your Heart Go?", "It's an Attack" and "Go...Now!"
- Mark Johnson – Moog synthesizer
- Raymond Johnson – Rhodes electric piano
- Irwin Krinsky – acoustic piano
- Luis Resto – acoustic piano, Oberheim OB-X, ARP synthesizers
- Wayne Kramer – guitars
- Bruce Nazarian – guitars, bass on "Wheel Me Out"
- Ricardo Rouse – guitars
- Mack Pitt – mandolin
- Jervonny Collier – bass
- Lamont Johnson – bass
- Jerry Jones – drums
- Franklin K. "Funklyn" McCullers – drums
- Larry Fratangelo – percussion
- Carl "Butch" Small – percussion, rap vocals
- Kevin Tschirhart – percussion, electronic handclaps
- Les Chambers – additional percussion
- Jim Matthews – additional percussion
- Gary Stuck – additional percussion
- David McMurray – alto saxophone, soprano saxophone, tenor saxophone
- Armand Angeloni – tenor saxophone, piccolo flute
- Marcus Belgrave – trumpet, flugelhorn
- Johnny Allen – string arrangements on "Where Did Your Heart Go?"
- Caroline Crawford, Michelle Goulet, Carol Hall, Sheila Horne and Kathy Kosins – backing vocals
- Tom Brzezina, Rick Cushingberry, Kim Heron, Mitchell Jacobs, Mark J. Norton, Richard Pinkston, Pam Schlom, Ruth Seymore, Anthony Was, Rubin Weiss, Lamont Zodiac and Mrs. Martinez's Fifth Hour Vocal Music Class/Birney Middle School – additional vocals

=== Production ===
- Michael Zilkha – executive producer
- Jack Tann – producer
- David Was – producer
- Don Was – producer, recording, mixing
- Burr Huntington – remote recording
- Ken Collier – dance mixes
- Ray Janos – mastering at CBS Studios (New York, NY)
- Maverse Players – art direction
- Terry Robinson – airbrush artwork
- Bill Thomas – typeset, keyline
- Dirk Bakker – cover and liner photography
