= Electrical Water Pageant =

Parade on Bay Lake & the Seven Seas Lagoon, Florida

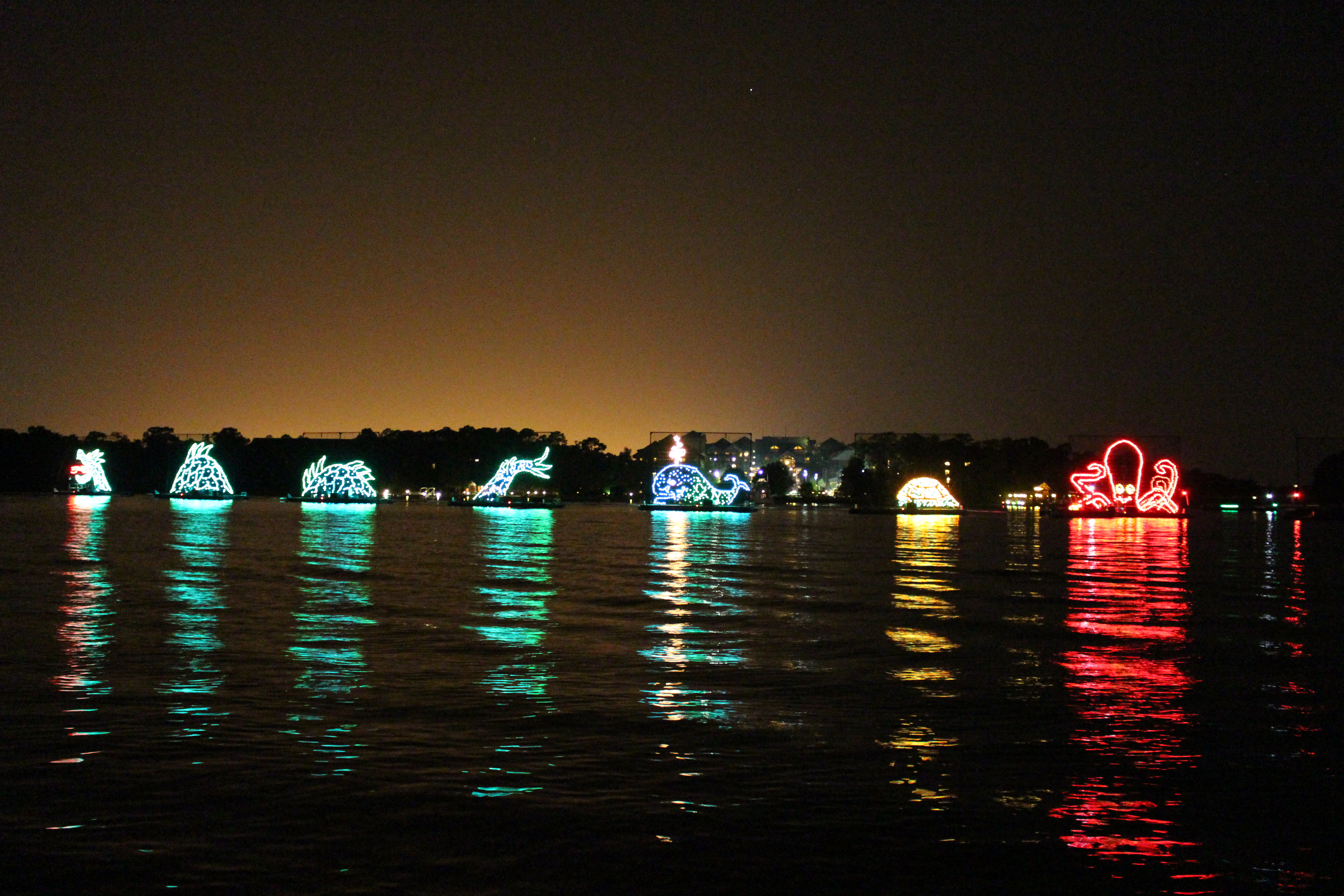
- The Electrical Water Pageant in April 2015
- Status: Operating
- Genre: Pageant
- Frequency: Daily
- Venue: Seven Seas Lagoon and Bay Lake
- Location: Walt Disney World
- Country: USA
- Inaugurated: October 25, 1971; 55 years ago

The Electrical Water Pageant is a show that takes place every evening (weather permitting) on Walt Disney World's Seven Seas Lagoon and Bay Lake. It features 14 floats with lights that depict images of sea creatures. Though it has changed somewhat since its debut in 1971, it remains one of the few original opening year shows to still be running at Walt Disney World.

== 1971 to 1977 Version ==
On Monday October 25, 1971; the Electrical Water Pageant premiered on the Seven Seas Lagoon and Bay Lake for "Dedication Day" at Walt Disney World. In addition to the 14 floats, its opening night included fireworks and pyrotechnics launched from the 14 floats and an additional float behind the Electrical Water Pageant. All of this was filmed by Walt Disney Productions and edited down for inclusion into The Wonderful World of Disney's Episode: "The Grand Opening of Walt Disney World", which aired on NBC on Friday October 29, 1971. The Paul Beaver version of Gershon Kingsley & Jean-Jacques Perrey's "Baroque Hoedown", created specially for the Electrical Water Pageant, was used from 1971 until 1977. The original Main Street Electrical Parade at Disneyland used the same soundtrack from 1972 until 1974. In 1977, the premiers of the updated version of the Disneyland Main Street Electrical Parade and new (but similar) Walt Disney World Main Street Electrical Parade used a new version of "Baroque Hoedown" updated by Don Dorsey.

The original lineup of floats for the Electrical Water Pageant were:

- Sea Serpent (three floats)
- Whale (one float)
- Two Sea Lions Playing With a Ball (one float)
- Clamshell Opening and Closing revealing a mermaid (one float)
- Three Mermaids (one float)
- Three Jumping Dolphins (three floats)
- Octopus (one float)
- Three Flying Fish (one float)
- Four Seahorses (one float)
- Neptune (one float)

While the 1971 version of "Baroque Hoedown" would play along with the Electrical Water Pageant through 1976, Disney melodies were added to the track and some of the floats were repositioned and others completely changed in 1972; and remained that way through 1976. While the track was essentially the same as what was heard during the Main Street Electrical Parade at Disneyland, an oscillator swoop was heard during the music transitions in the Electrical Water Pageant.

The 1972 to 1976 lineup of floats for the Electrical Water Pageant were:

- Sea Serpent (three floats)
- Two Sea Lions Playing With a Ball (one float)
- Whale (one float)
- Turtle (one float)
- Red Squid (one float)
- Three Jumping Dolphins (three floats)
- Three Flying Fish (one float)
- Octopus (one float) (updated later in 1973)
- Four Seahorses (one float)
- Neptune (one float)

== 1977 to 1995 Version ==
With the return of the Disneyland Main Street Electrical Parade in an updated form along with the brand new Walt Disney World Main Street Electrical Parade, a new version of Jean-Jacques Perry & Gershon Kingsley's "Baroque Hoedown" was created in 1977 to be used with both parades respectively featuring an updated rendition of Barque Hoedown recorded by Don Dorsey. To help distinguish the Electrical Water Pageant from the Main Street Electrical Parade, the original Kingsley-Perry version of "Baroque Hoedown" was dropped and a new version using various musical selections was created for both the opening and closing of the Electrical Water Pageant as well as each creature depicted in the pageant. Some of the original 1971 floats were saved or rearranged, while others were completely changed. The main themes for this version of the Electrical Water Pageant were synthesized arrangements from George Frideric Handel's Water Music.

The 1977 to 1995 lineup of floats for the Electrical Water Pageant were:

- Overture - "Hornpipe"
- Sea Serpent (four floats): "That Certain Serpent" - J. Christensen
- Whale (one float): "Whale Of A Tale" - N. Gimbel/A Hoffman
- Turtle (one float) (An updated version of the 1972 Turtle): "I'm A Turtle" - D. Dorsey
- Octopus (one float): "Up In Arms" - D. Dorsey
- Three Jumping Dolphins (three floats): "Waltz Almost" - J. Christensen
- Brachiosaurus (one float): "Up In Arms" Reprise - D. Dorsey
- Sea Monster (one float) (Later became a Crocodile in 1982): Bay-Sea Monster - J. Christensen
- Four Seahorses (one float) (An updated version of the 1971 Four Seahorses)
- Neptune (one float) (An updated version of the 1971 Neptune): "Hornpipe" (Reprise) mixed w/ all other themes
- Stars & Stripes Patriotic Medley
- Traveling Music: "The Bouree" - G.F. Handel

From October 1, 1981 – October 1, 1982, in honor of Walt Disney World's 10th anniversary, the Patriotic Finale music was replaced w/ the Tencennial theme song.

== 1996 to 2021 Version ==
The Electrical Water Pageant that guests see today consists of the same floats in the same formation dating back to 1977. The only difference is in 1996 when a new musical score was created for both the opening and closing of the Electrical Water Pageant as well as each creature depicted in the pageant. During a brief time, during summer 2016, the crocodile float was temporarily removed after the incident in which a 2 year old child was killed in an alligator attack in June 2016. It eventually returned in July 2016.

The 1996 to 2021 lineup of floats and music are:

Opening: "Fanfare" from The Little Mermaid

- Sea Serpent (four floats): "Boo Bop Bopbop Bop (I Love You Too)" from Pete's Dragon
- Whale (one float) (Updated later in 1997): "Whale of a Tale" from 20,000 Leagues Under the Sea
- Turtle (one float)
- Octopus (one float): "Poor Unfortunate Souls" from The Little Mermaid
- Three Jumping Dolphins (three floats)
- Brachiosaurus (one float): "Walk the Dinosaur" by Was (Not Was)
- Crocodile (one float): "Never Smile at a Crocodile" from Peter Pan
- Four Seahorses (one float): "Fanfare" & "Under the Sea" from The Little Mermaid
- Neptune (one float): "Fanfare" & "Under the Sea" from The Little Mermaid

All floats then change to the American Flag & Stars as they have been doing since 1971: (9 Piece) - "You're a Grand Old Flag", "Yankee Doodle", & "America the Beautiful"

Closing: "Fireworks" & "Jig" from The Little Mermaid

== 2021 to 2023/50th Anniversary Version ==
The 2021 to 2023 version received an update that replaced the opening and closing with a new electronic version of "The Magic is Calling", the theme song of Walt Disney World's 50th anniversary, or The World's Most Magical Celebration. All of the floats were also updated to include Disney World 50th logos and magic trails that shot out from the 50th logos. The show’s opening and closing also featured a male announcer marking the 50 year milestone of Walt Disney World and the tradition the electrical water pageant has had since day one.

The 2021 to 2023 lineup of floats and music are:

Opening: "The Magic is Calling" from Walt Disney World's 50th anniversary with male announcer voice welcoming viewers of the show at their respective resorts and celebrating 50 years of Walt Disney World. All floats start with Walt Disney World 50th anniversary logos (two floats) and magic trails (twelve floats)

- Sea Serpent (four floats): "Boo Bop Bopbop Bop (I Love You Too)" from Pete's Dragon
- Whale (one float) (Updated later in 1997): "Whale of a Tale" from 20,000 Leagues Under the Sea
- Turtle (one float)
- Octopus (one float): "Poor Unfortunate Souls" from The Little Mermaid
- Three Jumping Dolphins (three floats)
- Brachiosaurus (one float): "Walk the Dinosaur" by Was (Not Was)
- Crocodile (one float): "Never Smile at a Crocodile" from Peter Pan
- Four Seahorses (one float): "Fanfare" & "Under the Sea" from The Little Mermaid
- Neptune (one float): "Fanfare" & "Under the Sea" from The Little Mermaid

All floats then change to the American Flag & Stars as they have been doing since 1971: (9 Piece) - "You're a Grand Old Flag", "Yankee Doodle", & "America the Beautiful"

All floats then change back to Walt Disney World 50th anniversary floats (two floats) and magic trails (twelve floats) with male announcer voice wishing viewers of the show at their respective resorts a good night - Reprise of "The Magic is Calling"

== 2023 to Present Day Version ==
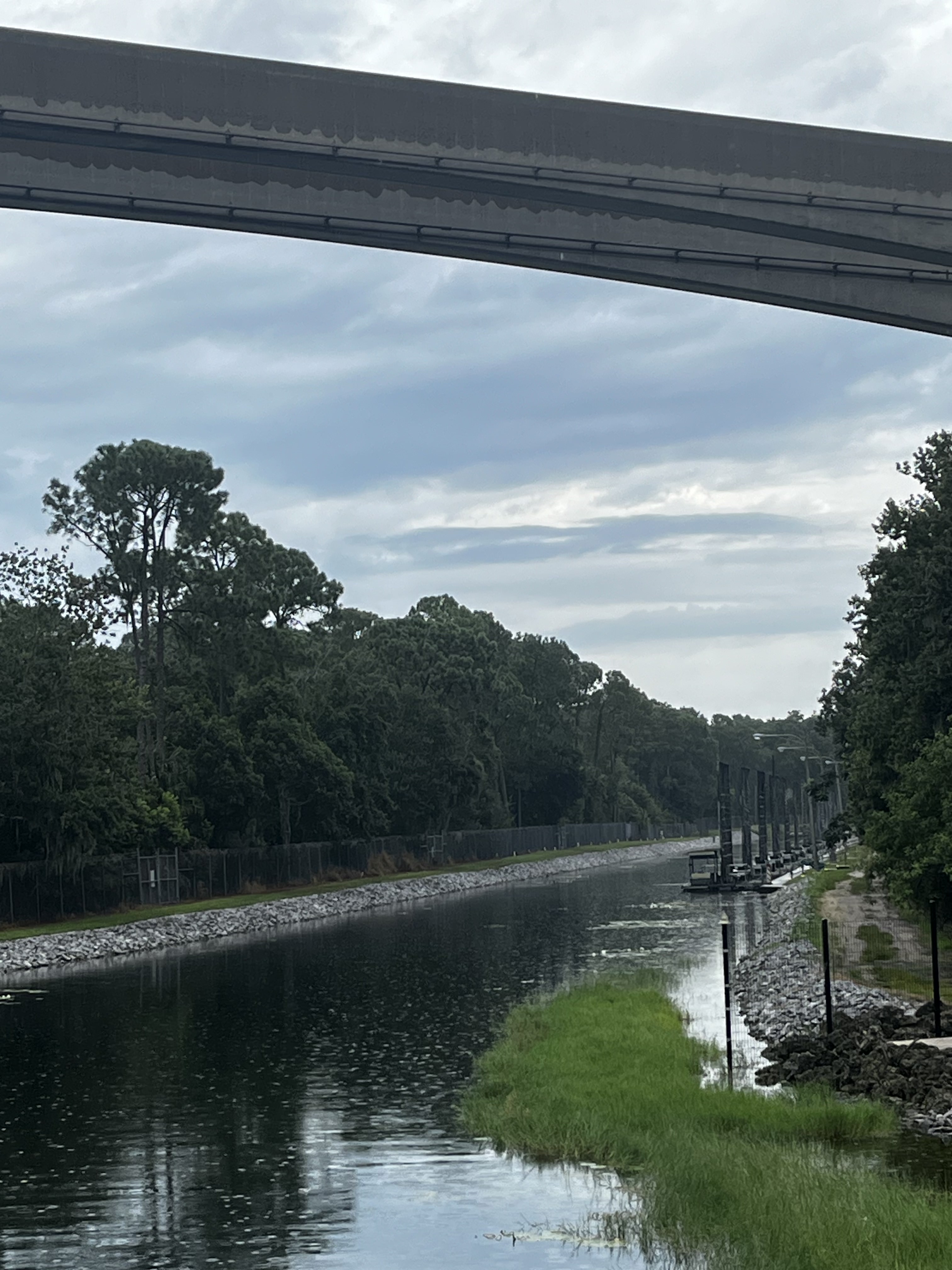
Electrical Water Pageant floats stored in the canal behind Magic Kingdom

After the conclusion of Walt Disney World’s 50th Anniversary Celebration in 2023, the Electrical Water Pageant returned to the soundtrack from the 1996 - 2021 version of the show with no changes, which is part of The Walt Disney Company's 100th anniversary celebration, as well as Walt Disney World Resort's 55th anniversary celebration. In November 2026, it was announced that the show was transition to vivid LED lighting providing sharper blues, cooler whites, and more saturated amber/orange tones.

Opening: "Fanfare" from The Little Mermaid

- Sea Serpent (four floats) "Boo Bop Bopbop Bop (I Love You Too)" from Pete's Dragon
- Whale (one float) (Updated later in 1997) "Whale of a Tale" from 20,000 Leagues Under the Sea
- Turtle (one float)
- Octopus (one float) "Poor Unfortunate Souls" from The Little Mermaid
- Three Jumping Dolphins (three floats)
- Brachiosaurus (one float) "Walk the Dinosaur" by Was (Not Was)
- Crocodile (one float) "Never Smile at a Crocodile" from Peter Pan
- Four Seahorses (one float) "Fanfare" & "Under the Sea" from The Little Mermaid
- Neptune (one float) "Fanfare" & "Under the Sea" from The Little Mermaid

All floats then change to the American Flag & Stars as they have been doing since 1971: (9 Piece) - "You're a Grand Old Flag", "Yankee Doodle", & "America the Beautiful"

Closing: "Fireworks" & "Jig" from The Little Mermaid
