= Debra Dobkin =

American drummer

- Born: Chicago, Illinois
- Occupation: Musician
- Instruments: Vocals, percussion
- Formerly of: Was (Not Was)
- Website: www.debradobkin.com

Debra Dobkin is an American vocalist, percussionist, music producer, and painter.

== Biography ==
=== Early history ===
She was selected at age 6 for children's scholarship classes by the Art Institute of Chicago, and later attended the School of Fine Art at Washington University in St. Louis.

Dobkin attended music school where she studied percussion and drumming. She draws and paints while recording music and touring. Dobkin moved to Los Angeles in 1976.

=== Projects ===
Dobkin has toured and recorded with Bonnie Raitt, Jackson Browne, Shawn Colvin, Don Henley, Wang Chung, and Was (not Was).

Along with Judith Owen, Dobkin participated in Richard Thompson's 1000 Years of Popular Music tour. A 2005 concert of this show was released on CD and DVD in 2006.

In 2009, Dobkin also participated in Thompson's Cabaret of Souls song cycle project commissioned by the International Society of Bassists. Thompson, Owen, Danny Thompson, Harry Shearer, and Pete Zorn also participated.

Dobkin has worked extensively with bassist Mark "Pocket" Goldberg, on other artists' projects and as the duo Dobkin & Goldberg and as the MPG Trio: Dobkin, Goldberg, and Nick Kirgo (guitar, vocals).

== Discography ==
=== 1978–1989 ===
- 1978: Wendy Waldman – Strange Company (Warner Bros.)
- 1979: The C.Y. Walkin' Band – Love the Way it Feels (Parachute)
- 1979: Lauren Wood – Lauren Wood (Warner Bros.)
- 1984: Timothy B Schmit – Playin' It Cool (Asylum)
- 1985: Pointer Sisters – Contact (RCA)
- 1986: Jackson Browne – Lives in the Balance (Asylum)
- 1986: Lone Justice – Shelter (Geffen)
- 1987: Cher – Cher (Geffen)
- 1987: Marc Jordan – Talking Through Pictures (RCA)
- 1988: Was (Not Was) – What Up, Dog? (Chrysalis)
- 1989: Cher – Heart of Stone (Geffen)
- 1989: Kon Kan – Move to Move (Atlantic)

=== 1991–1994 ===
- 1990: Was (Not Was) – Are You Okay? (Chrysalis)
- 1991: Bonnie Raitt – Luck of the Draw (Capitol)
- 1992: Melissa Etheridge – Never Enough (Island)
- 1992: Bobby Caldwell – Stuck on You (Sin-Drome)
- 1992: Delbert McClinton – Never Been Rocked Enough (Curb)
- 1992: Pops Staples – Peace to the Neighborhood (Pointbl ank)
- 1993: Stephen Bruton – What It Is (Dos)
- 1993: Willie Nelson – Across the Borderline (Columbia)
- 1993: Lowen & Navarro – Broken Moon (Mercury)
- 1994: Paul Kelly – Wanted Man (Vanguard)
- 1994: Arnold McCuller – Exception to the Rule (Coyote)
- 1994: Bonnie Raitt – Longing in Their Hearts (Capitol)

=== 1995–1999 ===
- 1995: Gary Taylor – The Mood Of Midnight (Morning Crew)
- 1995: Bonnie Raitt – Road Tested (Capitol)
- 1996: Leah Andreone – Veiled (RCA)
- 1996: Valerie Carter – The Way It Is (Countdown)
- 1996: Anne Murray – Anne Murray (EMI/SBK)
- 1996: Amy Sky – Cool Rain (Iron Music)
- 1996: The Subdudes – Primitive Streak (High Street)
- 1997: Jann Arden – Happy? (A&M)
- 1997: John Mayall & the Bluesbreakers – Blues For the Lost Days (Jive)
- 1998: Agents of Good Roots – One By One (RCA)
- 1998: CPR – CPR (Samson)
- 1998: Melanie Doane – Adam's Rib (Columbia)
- 1998: Storyville – Dog Years (Atlantic)
- 1999: Stephen Bruton – Nothing But the Truth (New West)

=== 2000–2004 ===
- 2000: Perla Batalla – Heaven And Earth: The Mestiza Voyage (Mechuda)
- 2000: Phil Roy – Grouchyfriendly (Ear Pictures)
- 2001: Epiphany Project – Epiphany Project (CD Baby)
- 2001: John Phillips – Pay Pack & Follow (Eagle)
- 2001: John Phillips – Phillips 66 (Eagle)
- 2001: Mark Islam – The Fine Print (Noble Savage)
- 2001: Claudia Russell – Song Food (Radio Rhythm)
- 2002: Stephen Bruton – Spirit World (New West)
- 2002: Sonia Dada – Barefootsoul (Calliope)
- 2002: John Trudell – Bone Days (Daemon)
- 2003: Marcia Ball – So Many Rivers (Alligator)
- 2004: Katey Sagal – Room (Valley)

=== 2005–2009 ===
- 2005: Missy Higgins – The Sound of White (Reprise)
- 2005: Judith Owen – Lost And Found (Courgette)
- 2005: Richard Thompson – Front Parlour Ballads (Cooking Vinyl)
- 2005: Jim Wilson – Place in my Heart (Artemis Nashville)
- 2006: Bob Malone – Born Too Late (Delta Moon)
- 2006: Johnny Lee Schell – Schell Game (New Light)
- 2006: Richard Thompson – 1000 Years of Popular Music CD, DVD (Cooking Vinyl)
- 2006: various artists – Rogue's Gallery: Pirate Ballads, Sea Songs, and Chanteys (ANTI-)
- 2008: Rebecca Pidgeon – Behind the Velvet Curtain: Songs from the Motion Picture Redbelt (Great American Music)
- 2008: Taj Mahal – Maestro (Heads Up)

=== 2010–present ===
- 2010: Elton John and Leon Russell – The Union (Decca)
- 2010: Miriams Well – Indians and Clowns (Buckin Savior)
- 2011: Orchestra Superstring – Easy (Dionysus)
- 2012: Teresa James & the Rhythm Tramps – Come on Home (Jesi-Lu)
- 2013: Claudia Russell – All Our Luck is Changing (Radio Rhythm)
- 2013: Richard Thompson – Electric (New West)
- 2013: various artists – Son of Rogues Gallery: Pirate Ballads, Sea Songs & Chanteys (ANTI-)
- 2014: Jim Wilson – Winterscape: Soothing Holiday Instrumentals Featuring Piano (Green Hill)
- 2015: Tito & Tarantula – Lost Tarantism (It.sounds)
- 2017: Chuck Berry – Chuck (Dualtone)
