= Boo! (album) =

Studio album by Was (Not Was)
- Released: April 8, 2008
- Studios: Henson Recording Studios, Cello Studios and Ocean Way Recording (Hollywood, California); Record Plant and Chomsky Ranch (Los Angeles, California); Karma Farm (Manhattan Beach, California)
- Genres: Pop, rock, pop rock, R&B, soul-jazz, funk
- Label: Rykodisc
- Producers: David Was, Don Was

Was (Not Was) chronology
Hello Dad... I'm in Jail (1992)	Boo! (2008)

Professional ratings
Review scores
Source	Rating
Allmusic	link
Robert Christgau	(2-star Honorable Mention)

Boo! is the fifth studio album by the band Was (Not Was). It was released in 2008, their first new album since 1990. The cover illustration is by David Was. In 2023, an expanded edition was released with two bonus tracks.

== Track listing ==
All tracks composed by David Was and Don Was, except where indicated.

1. "Semi-Interesting Week" – 4:49
2. "It's a Miracle" – 4:40
3. "Your Luck Won't Last" – 3:28
4. "From the Head to the Heart" – 4:15
5. "Big Black Hole" – 4:47
6. "Needletooth" – 2:14
7. "Forget Everything" – 5:16
8. "Crazy Water" – 4:48
9. "Mr. Alice Doesn't Live Here Anymore" (Bob Dylan, David Was, Don Was) – 4:05
10. "Green Pills in the Dresser" – 3:11
11. "Party Party Marty" (Expanded Edition only) – 3:55
12. "Somebody's Dead In New York" (Expanded Edition only) – 5:05

== Personnel ==
- David Was – keyboards, flute, harmonica, vocals
- Don Was – keyboards, programming, bass guitar, percussion, vocals
- Sweet Pea Atkinson – lead vocals
- Sir Harry Bowens – lead vocals
- Donald Ray Mitchell – lead vocals
- Jamie Muhoberac, Luis Resto – keyboards
- Booker T. Jones – Hammond B3 organ
- Randy Jacobs, Wayne Kramer, Val McCallum – guitars
- Greg Leisz – pedal steel guitar
- Tim Drummond, Marcus Miller – bass guitar
- Curt Bisquera, James Gadson – drums
- Lenny Castro – percussion
- Stephen Kupka – baritone saxophone
- Dave McMurray – saxophones, horn arrangements
- Rayse Biggs – trumpet
- Lee Thornton – trumpet
- David Campbell – string arrangements
- Sally Dworsky – backing vocals
- Portia Griffin – backing vocals
- Arnold McCuller – backing vocals
- Myrna Smith – backing vocals
- Kris Kristofferson – special guest vocals (10)

=== Production ===
- Ruby Marchand – A&R
- David Was – producer, cover illustration
- Don Was – producer, engineer, mixing, graphic design
- Rik Pekkonen – engineer, mixing
- Krish Sharma – engineer, mixing
- Dan Bosworth – assistant engineer
- Kevin Mills – assistant engineer
- Louie Teran – mastering at Marcussen Mastering (Hollywood, California)
- Jamie Hoyt-Vitale – package design
- Ron Meckler – graphic design
- Ellen Stone – band photography
- Jamie Muhoberac – club photography
- Nancy Scibilla – management
- Ron Stone – management
