= Never Smile at a Crocodile =

Song from the 1953 film Peter Pan

"Never Smile at a Crocodile" is a comic song with music by Frank Churchill and lyrics by Jack Lawrence. The music, without the lyrics, was first heard in the Walt Disney Animation Studios film Peter Pan.

== History ==
Churchill, who had composed most of the soundtrack for Disney's 1937 Snow White and the Seven Dwarfs, composed "Never Smile at a Crocodile" in 1939 when Peter Pan was already in the planning stage. However, work on four other Disney feature-length cartoons led the studio to shelve the Peter Pan project until 1949. Churchill died as a result of suicide in 1942 and the song was to be his only contribution to the Peter Pan soundtrack. The sung version with Jack Lawrence's lyrics was eliminated from the final print of the film when it was released in 1953. The final soundtrack contains only the instrumental version which is used as a leitmotif whenever the crocodile appears. However, the full version with vocals by Stuart Foster and Judy Valentine was released that same year on an RCA LP of songs from the film.

"Never Smile at a Crocodile" with its original lyrics has been subsequently recorded by several singers including Jerry Lewis and Rolf Harris. The 1953 Jerry Lewis version became one of the top-10 best-selling children's records that year. An early Disney demo of the vocal version sung by Henry Calvin was added as a bonus track on later releases of the Peter Pan soundtrack including the 1997 CD release. The song also appears on a 1965 recording by Billy Cotton and his band with vocals by Rita Williams and on the soundtrack of the 2007 film Rogue sung by The Paulette Sisters and Larry Clinton and His Orchestra . This version is briefly featured in the 1998 film You've Got Mail (during the scene where Joe first meets Kathleen) although it is not on the official soundtrack album.
