= Street Tough =

Studio album by Ben E. King
- Released: 1981
- Studios: Atlantic, New York
- Genre: Soul
- Length: 38:40
- Label: Atlantic
- Producers: Ben E. King, Ray Chew, Barrie Palmer, Janet Alhanti, Gerry Thomas

Ben E. King chronology
What Is Soul (1981)	Street Tough (1981)	Save The Last Dance For Me (1987)

Professional ratings
Review scores
Source	Rating
AllMusic	3/5 stars
The Encyclopedia of Popular Music	2/5 stars
The New Rolling Stone Record Guide	2/5 stars

Street Tough is a studio album by American singer Ben E. King, his final album released directly with Atlantic Records. It was released in 1981. King worked with his son, Ben Jr., on some of the tracks.

== Singles ==
Two singles were released from the album. "Street Tough" backed with "Why Is the Question" came out first, followed by "You Made the Difference in My Life" backed with "Souvenirs of Love", both in 1981.

== Track listing ==
Side one
No.	Title	Writer(s)	Length
1.	"Street Tough"	Willie Hutch	4:28
2.	"Made for Each Other"	Barrie Palmer; Janet Alhanti	4:44
3.	"Staying Power"	Frederick Knight	4:41
4.	"Stay Awhile with Me"	Joe Cobb; Van McCoy	5:31

Side two
No.	Title	Writer(s)	Length
1.	"Why Is the Question"	Ben E. King; Ben E. King Jr.	4:28
2.	"You Made the Difference to My Life"	Palmer; Alhanti	5:39
3.	"Souvenirs of Love"	Palmer; Alhanti	3:44
4.	"Something to Be Loved"	Michael Terence Ward	5:25
Total length:			38:40
