= Bruce Nazarian =

American funk and rock musician

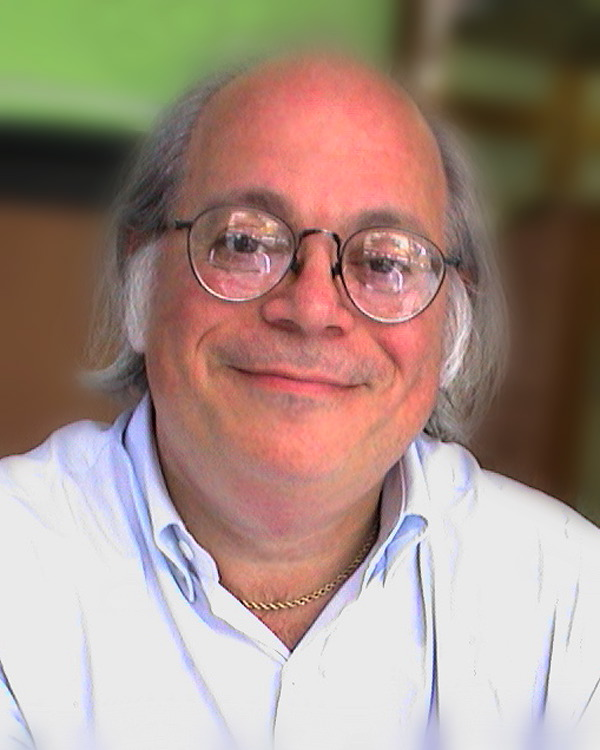
Bruce Nazarian

Bruce Nazarian (March 27, 1949 – October 9, 2015) was an American funk and rock musician, recording artist and music producer from Detroit, Michigan.

Nazarian was an Apple Certified Trainer and Certified Pro on various professional applications, including DVD Studio Pro and Logic Pro. He authored several books on music and technology and served as President of Digital Media Consulting Group, Inc. as well as TDG Foundation, Inc., his non-profit charitable foundation. Nazarian was also President of the International Digital Media Alliance (IDMA), formerly known as the DVD Association (DVDA).

== Biography and early music influences ==
Bruce Nazarian began his musical career as a singer at the age of four, performing regularly on local television (WXYZ-TV) and in USO musical variety shows in his hometown of Detroit. During his grade school years, he studied piano and vocals, and at age 13 took up tenor saxophone and played in the Mackenzie High School band under director Craig Strain. Later, he also sang in the Mackenzie High School Choir, under the direction of Claire Weimer. At age 17 he entered Wayne State University (WSU) for four years of musical study and began playing professionally with local artists and bands in Detroit.

In 1968, he toured Europe with the Wayne State University Men's Glee Club, under the direction of Dr. Harry Langsford, and participated in the 1968 International Musical Eisteddfod in Llangollen, Wales, where the WSU Men's Glee Club won first prize.

Also during his college years, he began a career as a studio musician at the urging of recording engineer Jim Bruzzese, owner of Detroit's Pampa Studios. He quickly became a "first-call" guitarist in the Detroit recording scene, working with diverse and influential producers like Don Davis, Don Was, and George Clinton, recording engineers Ken Sands and Jim Vitti, and R&B musicians like Earl Van Dyke, Richard "Pistol" Allen, Uriel Jones, Robert White and many other members of the Motown studio band the Funk Brothers. While doing sessions, Nazarian also maintained an active presence on the local music scene, playing with such diverse musical units as the Austin-Moro Big Band, and even the Glenn Miller Orchestra. All these musical influences formed part of his overall versatility towards music creation. Funk and R&B, however, took hold of a special place in his musical arsenal, as later musical endeavors would reveal.

== Early music career ==
Shortly after completing college, Nazarian began touring and recording with playing with many local and national acts, including Brian Hyland. In the early 70's, he recorded and toured with Invictus Records' "The 8th Day", and was lead singer on "If I Could Just See The Light", their third national single. The 8th Day was a unique act for that period, with half the members white, and half black. During that period he also performed with "The 8th Day" at the Apollo Theater in Harlem, a unique experience for a white musician of that time period.

In 1975, a chance meeting with band manager Al Nalli would lead to his joining Brownsville Station (of "Smokin' in the Boys' Room" fame). During the next few years, he participated in countless live shows and recorded several albums with Brownsville, including "Brownsville Station" aka 'The Red Album' (recorded at Cenacle in Mt. Kisco New York, during which "Martian Boogie" was created), and "Air Special" for Epic, which was to be Brownsville's last recorded work. He remained a member of Brownsville Station until May, 1979.

== Detroit music career ==
Around 1979, Nazarian formed "The A-Band", a group of Detroit studio musicians who performed casually in the Detroit area. The A-Band became the basis of a new band, "The Automatix", a contemporary rock/pop band that featured close friend and session veteran Jerry Jones on drums, local vocal legend Shaun Murphy on lead vocals, Luis Resto (of Was (Not Was) and, later, Eminem fame) on keyboards, and funk bassist Hugh Hitchcock. The Automatix changed personnel a few times along the way, and by the time they landed a recording contract with MCA in 1982, the lineup included guitarist Randy Jacobs and bassist Nolan Mendenhall, along with keyboardist Jim Noel. The Automatix' debut LP Night Rider, released in 1983, was quickly heading up the AOR charts when the band found themselves with a dilemma: Incoming MCA President Irving Azoff had reduced MCA's artist roster from 42 acts to 7, and by the end of 1983, the Automatix were without a label and disheartened - disbanding shortly thereafter. The band recorded its namesake LP in a multitrack studio created by Nazarian for the project, Gnome Sound Studios.

== Pioneering digital sequencing and dance music production ==
After the Automatix disbanded, Nazarian continued producing, branching out into dance music, and utilizing many of early analog and digital sequencing tricks he had been developing. His earliest productions included use of the Oberheim DSX sequencer and OB-8 Synthesizer, as well as the Roland MSQ-700 MIDI sequencer and SBX-80 Sync Box. Later productions were created using the Linn 9000, an integrated drum machine / MIDI sequencer, and racks of outboard MIDI modules. Ever in search of higher quality sound, and freedom from reliance on multitrack tape, in 1985 he acquired the first of what would eventually be many Synclavier digital music systems, and companion Direct-to-Disc hard disk recording systems.

During those years, he produced many successful dance music recordings, while maintaining an active career as a session guitarist. Midway's "Set It Out" (featuring Donald Ray Mitchell of Was (Not Was) on lead vocals) became a Billboard-charting dance hit, even appearing on the soundtrack of "Breakin' II - Electric Boogaloo". Millie Scott's "Prisoner of Love" and "Love Me Right" were huge hits in the U.K., re-igniting her R&B career, and led to a full LP on 4th and Broadway (later CD) that included downtempo club favorites "Automatic" and "Ev'ry LIttle Bit". Some of the projects were Produced with Detroit DJ Duane Bradley, and some were produced with close friend Jerry Jones.

Nazarian also collaborated with Don Was on producing several 12" recordings, including "Too Busy Thinking About My Baby" from "Orbit", featuring the vocal talents of Carol Hall. He also produced or co-produced Nighthawk's 1982 "Eye of the Tiger", Mitch Ryder's 1985 version of "Like A Rolling Stone", Gerry Woo's "Hey There Lonely Girl" and Vic Faster's Slingshot version of "Unchain My Heart". "I've Got The Night off" from Detroiter Kathy Kosins became a staple of Hi-NRG DeeJays spinning Euro-disco ...

Nazarian also worked extensively with Jimmy Lifton and produced many 12" records that appeared on Lifton's Orphan Records, including Lifton's own version of "I'm A Man", later re-released on Atlantic records.

== Wayne State University ==
After over a decade of live performances and studio sessions, in 1981 Nazarian was tapped to become Adjunct Music Instructor in the new Contemporary Media Program at Wayne State University. He created the course syllabus and wrote the textbook for Recording and Electronic Techniques for Musicians, a class designed to teach modern multi-track recording techniques as seen from the musician's point of view, instead of the engineer's. The courseware was eventually published Commercially as: Recording Production Techniques for Musicians (AMSCO Press, 1988). The book was unique in that its text and graphics had been created entirely on the brand new Macintosh Computer.

== New York years ==
In summer 1986, Nazarian was approached by producer Mike Theodore, an old friend, who suggested he consider relocating Gnome Sound to New York. By November the die was cast, and after the completion of recording and mixing on Haywoode's "I Can't Let You Go" for CBS UK, Gnome Sound was moved to New York City, where it landed at Theodore's Planet Sound Studios, just around the corner from Madison Square Garden.

Nazarian's skill as engineer, producer and Synclavier operator quickly brought him a reputation in the New York market, and netted him a new stream of clients - film composers who wanted electronic augmentation for their film scores. One of the first of these was Charles Gross, with whom Nazarian collaborated on a number of film scores, from Turner and Hooch to their last collaboration, Air America in 1990. (It was Nazarian who played all of the lead guitar solos on the movie's orchestral soundtrack)

The second Millie Scott Album, "I Can Make It Good For You" was a groundbreaking project, in that it was recorded entirely without multitrack tape. All tracks were created using music sequences programmed into the Synclavier, and live audio recorded directly into the 16-track Direct-to-Disc system. The one exception to "tapeless" was the final master mixes which were recorded on Sony 2500 DAT machine.

In 1988, he recorded vocals and produced some demos for Anita Baker's "Giving You The Best That I've Got" album, and provided Anita with her first experience with recording on a Direct-to-Disc digital recording system. Anita would later call again on Nazarian to record her vocals digitally. This would be one of the last projects recorded at the W. 30th Street studio location. Shortly after, Gnome Studios NYC was moved into the 37 W. 20th street location of Hip Pocket Recording Studios (later called Back Pocket).

== Los Angeles years ==
In early 1990, Nazarian met producer David Kershenbaum, who at the time was finalizing the purchase of Studio 55 from then-owner Richard Perry. Kershenbaum's purchase led to the formation of "Powertrax" a complex of studios within the former Studio 55 that recorded music and performed audio post-production as well as music supervision using then-new digital music techniques.

Nazarian and Gnome's Studio 2 from New York landed at Powertrax in June 1990, just in time to begin work with film composer Charles Gross on the score for "Air America". In addition to creating many Synclavier orchestral pre-realizations for Gross, Nazarian was also heavily featured as lead guitarist on the film's score. Powertrax also played host to fellow Synclavier owner John Barnes, whose musical experiences with Michael Jackson and Marvin Gaye made him legendary in the L.A. studio scene. . Powertrax closed in December 1990, and Gnome Studios West moved to The Complex in West L.A., the former studio home of Earth Wind and Fire.

== From music to audio post ==
Gnome Studios at the Complex remained active in music until 1991, when Nazarian segued into audio post-production, becoming Sound Editor for, and eventually Supervising Sound Editor of "Dinosaurs" a Disney-produced network show running on ABC TV. As Supervising Sound Editor for Dinosaurs, Nazarian expanded his audio post-production efforts dramatically, creating his own company, Post Pro, Inc., to provide sound editorial services for the show. Simultaneously, Gnome Productions was providing sound editorial and mixing services on many animated TV shows, including Sonic The Hedgehog from DIC for which Nazarian and fellow mixer Dennis Patterson won an MPSE Golden Reel award in 1993. Gnome also received many MPSE nominations for sound editing and mixing in subsequent years.

By 1993, Nazarian had relocated his sound editorial operations to become part of Soundworks West, a new audio post facility created in the old Hitsville West studio complex on Romaine Street in Los Angeles. While part of Soundworks West, Nazarian was one of the Supervising Sound Editors on "Gettysburg" one of the first feature films to make extensive use of Digital Mix-to-Picture, a new technique where sound effects, Foley and dialog/ADR were played back live on the dub stage from digital devices, instead of from pre-recorded mag film. This technique would be further refined when Gnome Studios once again relocated, in early 1994, into Skywalker Sound South at the former Lion's Gate studio facilities on Bundy Drive.

During the years at Bundy Drive, the Gnome Productions Sound editorial operation grew until it needed to expand beyond the space available at Bundy Drive.

== Magnolia Studios ==
Seeking additional editorial space, as well as a dub stage of their own, Gnome Productions' sound editorial operation was moved to Burbank, where it took over the former B&B sound studios. B&B was home, at the time, to Horta Editorial as well as the remains of B&B Sound. Magnolia and Horta shared the facility until Horta's later relocation, after which Magnolia took the entire space as its own.

The Main dub stage at Magnolia was remodeled to contemporary audio post specs by designer Steven Klein, and certified to THX dub stage standards. The existing analog dubbing equipment (film projector and mag dubbers) were kept intact, and a digital sound and projection chain was implemented that would run in parallel with the analog chain, allowing for traditional film dubbing to take place on the stage while providing SMPTE-based sync for the Synclavier and Direct-to-Disc digital workstations that now resided on the digital part of the dub stage. An AMS Neve Logic 2 digital console was installed, to provide digital signal path film dubbing. There too, Nazarian was ahead of his time - while the Logic 2 was a bit flaky, the insight gained by AMS Neve from the Magnolia installation enabled them to perfect the DFC Digital Film Console, which reflected the functionality of digital mixing pioneered by Magnolia.

Magnolia played host to Walt Disney Television, mixing many of their 1995 season's TV movies, as well as a host of independent feature films, and animation shows. In February 1998, Magnolia was sold to Millennium Sound, and Nazarian moved on to a different creative career.

== DVD authoring and "The Digital Guy" ==
In 1999, Nazarian became Director of DVD Training at Video Symphony in Los Angeles. During that time, he ran an independent authoring company called eVideo, which authored many innovative and interesting DVD projects. In February 2001, he left Video Symphony to create Gnome Digital Media, an independent DVD authoring company and home base for his growing DVD consulting and training practice. He took the nom de plume "The DVD Guy" during the early years, and later changed it to "The Digital Guy", by which he was known until his death.

== DVDA and the IDMA ==
In 2000, Nazarian accepted a position on the advisory board of the DVDA, a non-profit trade association promoting optical disc media production. In 2005 he was elected to the board of directors, and in 2006, he was elected vice-president. In 2007 he was elected president.

== Authored works and articles ==
Nazarian also had a long involvement with the written word. From 1985 to 1986, he was a contributing editor to MIX magazine, where he created "In Sync", a monthly column devoted to computerized music production, sequencing and MIDI.

In 1988, the textbook he had written for his university class "Recording and Electronic Techniques for Musicians" was published as "Recording Production Techniques for Musicians" by AMSCO Press. The book and all artwork were created on an early Macintosh 128K using MacWrite and MacPaint, making it one of the first books printed from an electronic manuscript. Many of the topics in the book are still relevant to today's digital recording process.

In 2004, he wrote "DVD Studio Pro 2 - The Complete Guide to Authoring with Macintosh", published by McGraw-Hill. In 2006, he wrote "DVD Studio Pro 4 - The Complete Guide to Authoring with Macintosh", published by McGraw-Hill. Both books covered DVD authoring with Apple DVD Studio Pro in great depth.

In 2009, he wrote "Fast Path to Blu-ray for Mac", published by The Digital Guy Press.

== Musical influences ==
Nazarian counted a number of musicians as his "first heroes", including Earl Van Dyke, James Jamerson, Robert White, Dennis Coffey, Joe Messina, Jack Brokensha and Motown arranger David van de Pitte. He was additionally influenced by numerous rock and jazz musicians.

== Discography ==
As an artist

- The Automatix (1983 - MCA)

With Brownsville Station

- 1975: Motor City Connection (Big Tree Records)
- 1977: Brownsville Station (a.k.a. 'The Red Album') (Private Stock Records)
- 1978: Air Special (Epic Records)
