= Spy in the House of Love (song) =

Single by Was (Not Was)

from the album What Up, Dog?
- B-side: "Dad I'm in Jail"
- Released: July 1987; February 1988 (re-release)
- Genre: Pop rock, funk
- Length: 4:18
- Label: Chrysalis (US); Fontana/Phonogram (UK)
- Songwriters: David Was, Don Was
- Producer: Paul Staveley O'Duffy

Was (Not Was) singles chronology
"Robot Girl" (1986)	"Spy in the House of Love" (1987)	"Walk the Dinosaur" (1987)
"The Boy's Gone Crazy" (1987)	"Spy in the House of Love" (1988)	"Out Come the Freaks (Again)" (1988)

"Spy in the House of Love" is a song by art-funk ensemble Was (Not Was). It was released in 1987, but became a large hit for the group in the U.S. and the UK in 1988.

== Track listing ==
7" vinyl [worldwide] / Cassette [US]

1. "Spy in the House of Love" – 4:18
2. "Dad I'm in Jail" – 1:24

12" vinyl (1) [Europe]

1. "Spy in the House of Love (Jeffrey B. Young and Dangerous Mix)" – 6:31
2. "Dad I'm in Jail" – 1:25
3. "Spy in the House of Love (Streetsahead Mix)" – 5:29

12" vinyl (2) [Europe]

1. "Spy in the House of Love (Jeffrey B. Young and Dangerous Mix)" – 6:31
2. "Spy in the House of Love (Single Mix)"
3. "Spy in the House of Love (In House Mix)"
4. "Dad I'm in Jail" – 1:25

12" vinyl (3) [Europe] / CD [Europe]

1. "Spy in the House of Love (Jeffrey B. Young and Dangerous Mix)" – 6:31
2. "Walk The Dinosaur (The New York Dangerous Mix)" – 6:01
3. "Dad I'm in Jail" – 1:25
4. "Spy in the House of Love (Streetsahead Mix)" – 5:29

12 vinyl (4) [Europe]

1. "Spy in the House of Love (Jeffrey B. Young & Dangerous Mix)" – 6:32
2. "Dad I'm In Jail" – 1:25
3. "Spy in the House of Love (Streetsahead Mix)" – 5:30
4. "Spy in the House of Love (My Name Is Young, Jeffrey B. Young, Licensed to 'ill Mix)" – 6:06

12" vinyl [US]

1. "Spy in the House of Love (Jeffrey B. Young & Dangerous Mix)" – 6:30
2. "Spy in the House of Love (Streetsahead Mix)" – 5:30
3. "Spy in the House of Love (Derek B. Mix)" – 4:54
4. "Spy in the House of Love (Single Mix)" – 4:00

== Remixes ==
- "Single Mix" – 4:01
- "Jeffrey B. Young and Dangerous Mix" – 6:31 – mixed by Jeff Young
- "My Name Is Young, Jeffrey B. Young, Licensed to 'ill Mix" – 6:06 – mixed by Jeff Young
- "Streetshead Mix" – 5:29 – mixed by Streets Ahead
- "In House Mix" – mixed by Paul Staveley O'Duffy
- "Derek B. Mix" – 4:54 – mixed by Derek B

== Chart positions ==
Chart (1987)	Peak Position
UK Singles (OCC)	51
Chart (1988, reissue)	Peak Position
Ireland (IRMA)	13
UK Singles (OCC)	21
US Billboard Hot 100	16
US Dance Club Songs (Billboard)	1
US Hot R&B/Hip-Hop Songs (Billboard)	77
