= Was (Not Was) =

American band

- Origin: Detroit, Michigan, United States
- Genres: Dance-pop; funk; post-disco; dance-rock; college rock
- Years active: 1979–1992; 2004–present
- Labels: ZE; Geffen; Chrysalis; Fontana
- Members: David Weiss; Don Fagenson; Harry Bowens; Carol Hall; Donald Ray Mitchell; Randy Jacobs; Rayse Biggs; David McMurray; Luis Resto; Jamie Muhoberac
- Past members: Marcus Belgrave; Bruce Nazarian; Sweet Pea Atkinson; Debra Dobkin; James Gadson; Wayne Kramer
- Website: World Wide Was

Was (Not Was) is an American band founded in 1979 in Detroit, Michigan, by David Weiss and Don Fagenson, who adopted the respective stage names David Was and Don Was. Their song catalog features an eclectic mix of pop and rock styles, often featuring guest musicians from across the musical spectrum. The band's most popular period was during the 1980s and early 1990s, with their highest-charting hit, the song "Walk the Dinosaur", released in 1987 as the lead single from their 1988 album What Up, Dog?, becoming a worldwide top-40 hit and peaking at No. 7 on the Billboard Hot 100 singles chart. The band went on indefinite hiatus in the mid-1990s, but has returned sporadically since the turn of the millennium. Their most recent release was the 2008 album Boo!.

== Career ==
=== 1979–1982: Beginnings ===
Weiss and Fagenson were childhood friends who grew up together in suburban Detroit, Michigan, United States. Partly due to Fagenson's poverty they decided to form Was (Not Was) in 1979. The name of the band was derived from Fagenson's then-infant son Tony, who was just beginning to talk and enjoyed contradicting words (such as "blue" with "not blue"). Their first recording was "Wheel Me Out", a 12-inch dance record for the avant-garde ZE Records. David's mother Elizabeth Elkin Weiss, an actress and radio pioneer in their native Detroit, provided the outré vocals. The track was later included on the 2000 compilation album Disco Not Disco.

Their first album Was (Not Was) (1981) was an amalgam of rock, disco, Weiss's beat poetry, Reagan-era political-social commentary, and jazz. On vocals they recruited Harry Bowens and "Sweet Pea" Atkinson, who frequently found themselves singing absurdist and satirical songs alongside tender ballads. Wayne Kramer of MC5, The Knack's Doug Fieger, and trumpeter Marcus Belgrave were among the guest players.

In 1982, the group played on Don't Walk Away, a solo album for lead singer "Sweet Pea" Atkinson.

=== 1983–1988: Development ===
Born to Laugh at Tornadoes (1983) had even more guest musicians, including Ozzy Osbourne rapping over electro, Mitch Ryder singing a techno-rockabilly number, Mel Tormé performing a ballad about asphyxiation, and an abstract funk piece called "Man vs. the Empire Brain Building". Singer Donald Ray Mitchell joined the group as third lead vocalist.

In 1988, they found their biggest hit with the album What Up, Dog?, which featured the singles "Walk the Dinosaur" and "Spy in the House of Love". Special guests included Stevie Salas, John Patitucci, Frank Sinatra Jr., and a writing credit from Elvis Costello.

=== 1989–1997: Hiatus, film and animation work ===
Artist/animator Christoph Simon created videos to accompany some of their stranger album tracks, such as "What Up, Dog?", "Dad I'm in Jail," and the Tom Waits-style "Earth to Doris." The videos appeared on MTV's Liquid Television and in various film festivals, including the Spike & Mike festival. Around this time, the Was Brothers developed separate careers as producers, film scorers, and music supervisors.

The group followed up with Are You Okay? in 1990, spearheaded by a cover of "Papa Was a Rollin' Stone". Guest musicians included Iggy Pop, Leonard Cohen, The Roches, and Syd Straw. After a tour with Dire Straits in 1992 and a UK Top 5 single with "Shake Your Head", which included vocals from Ozzy Osbourne and actress Kim Basinger, Weiss and Fagenson drifted apart, subsequently releasing only a compilation album Hello Dad... I'm in Jail. Some members, however, did appear on Don's Orquestra Was project Forever Is a Long Long Time (1997), which re-interpreted Hank Williams in a jazz/R&B vein.

=== 1998–present: Reunion and modern works ===
From 1998 up until 2004, the band remained inactive before Was (Not Was) reformed for a two-month club tour through the US, including stops at the House of Blues in Cleveland and Chicago and the Trocadero in Philadelphia. In October 2005, they played four gigs at the Jazz Café in London.

In 2008, they released their fifth studio album, Boo!, featuring guest appearances from Kris Kristofferson, Wayne Kramer, Marcus Miller and Booker T. Jones, plus a song originally co-written with Bob Dylan nearly 20 years earlier. On April 22, they performed on the British show Later... with Jools Holland, and on May 2, they were the musical guest on Late Night with Conan O'Brien. The band toured the US that year, beginning on April 30.

== Commentary ==
Writing in Detroit's Metro Times, Brian J. Bowe described the band as "an endearing mess....a sausage factory of funk, rock, jazz and electronic dance music, all providing a boogie-down backdrop for a radical (and witty) political message of unbridled personal freedom and skepticism of authority."

== Discography ==
Was (Not Was) discography
- Studio albums: 5
- Compilation albums: 4
- Singles: 19

=== Studio albums ===
Year	Information	Chart positions				
Year	Information	US	AUS	NL	NZ	UK
1981	Was (Not Was): Released: 1981 (Expanded and reissued 2004 as Out Come the Freaks); Labels: ZE/Island	–	–	–	–	–
1983	Born to Laugh at Tornadoes: Released: September 1983; Labels: ZE/Geffen	134	–	–	–	–
1988	What Up, Dog?: Released: April 1988; Labels: Chrysalis Records (US), Phonogram (Europe)	43	–	57	41	47
1990	Are You Okay?: Released: July 1990; Labels: Chrysalis Records (US), Fontana (Europe)	99	107	82	34	35
2008	Boo!: Released: April 8, 2008 (Expanded and reissued 2023); Labels: Ryko	–	–	–	–	–
"–" denotes releases that did not chart or were not released in that territory.

=== Compilation albums ===
Year	Information
1984	The Woodwork Squeaks: Remixes and B-sides; Released: 1984 (Reissued and expanded in 2004); Labels: ZE/Island
1989	New Steak Trend: Remixes and B-sides; Released: 1989; Label: Fontana (Japan only)
1992	Hello Dad... I'm in Jail: Greatest hits album; Released: June 1992; Labels: Polygram, Fontana (Europe); Chart Position: No. 61 (UK); Chart Position: No. 132 (AUS)
2004	The Collection: LP tracks and B-sides; Released: May 2004; Labels: Spectrum Music
2010	Hey, King Kong!!!: Pick of the Litter 1980-2010: Career retrospective; Released: February 23, 2010; Labels: Micro Werks

=== Singles ===
Year	Title	Chart positions										Album
Year	Title	US Hot 100	US Club Play	US R&B	AUS	IRL	NL	NZ	UK	SA	FR	Album
1980	"Wheel Me Out"	–	34	–	–	–	–	–	–	–	–	Mutant Disco: A Subtle Discolation of the Norm
1981	"Out Come the Freaks"	–	16	–	–	–	–	–	–	–	–	Was (Not Was)
1981	"Where Did Your Heart Go?"	–	–	–	–	–	–	–	–	-	–	Was (Not Was)
1982	"Tell Me That I'm Dreaming"	–	3	68	–	–	–	–	–	–	–	Was (Not Was)
1983	"Smile"	106	–	–	–	–	–	–	–	–	–	Born to Laugh at Tornadoes
1983	"Knocked Down, Made Small (Treated Like a Rubber Ball)"	109	–	–	–	–	–	–	–	–	–	Born to Laugh at Tornadoes
1984	"(Return to the Valley of) Out Come the Freaks"	–	–	–	–	–	–	–	41	–	–	Born to Laugh at Tornadoes
1986	"Robot Girl"	–	–	–	–	–	–	–	95	–	–	What Up, Dog?
1987	"Spy in the House of Love"	16	1	77	79	–	16	41	51	–	–	What Up, Dog?
1987	"Walk the Dinosaur"	7	11	–	9	11	10	16	10	10	49	What Up, Dog?
1987	"Boy's Gone Crazy"	–	–	–	–	–	–	–	84	–	–	What Up, Dog?
1988	"Spy in the House of Love" (re-issue)	–	–	–	90	13	–	–	21	26	–	What Up, Dog?
1988	"Out Come the Freaks (Again)"	–	–	–	–	–	86	–	44	–	–	What Up, Dog?
1988	"Anything Can Happen"	75	19	–	–	–	–	–	67	–	–	What Up, Dog?
1990	"Papa Was a Rollin' Stone"	–	10	60	75	11	14	22	12	–	–	Are You Okay?
1990	"How the Heart Behaves"	–	35	–	–	–	–	–	53	–	–	Are You Okay?
1990	"I Feel Better Than James Brown"	–	–	–	163	–	–	–	91	–	–	Are You Okay?
1992	"Listen Like Thieves"	–	–	–	–	–	–	–	58	–	–	Hello Dad...I'm in Jail
1992	"Shake Your Head"	–	–	–	47	8	–	–	4	–	–	Hello Dad...I'm in Jail
1992	"Somewhere in America (There's a Street Named after My Dad)"	–	–	–	–	–	–	–	57	–	–	Hello Dad...I'm in Jail
"–" denotes releases that did not chart or were not released in that territory.

=== Contributions ===
- A Christmas Record (1981, ZE Records) - "Christmas Time in the Motor City"
- That's the Way I Feel Now: A Tribute to Thelonious Monk (1984, A&M Records) - "Ba-Lue-Bolivar-Ba-Lues-Are"
- Stay Awake: Various Interpretations of Music from Vintage Disney Films (1988, A&M Records) - "Baby Mine"

== See also ==
- List of number-one dance hits (United States)
- List of artists who reached number one on the US Dance chart
