= Sweet Pea Atkinson =

American singer (1945–2020)

- Born: Hillard Atkinson; September 20, 1945; Oberlin, Ohio, U.S.
- Died: May 5, 2020 (aged 74) Los Angeles, California, U.S.
- Genres: R&B, funk, rock
- Occupation: Singer
- Instrument: Vocals
- Years active: 1970s–2020
- Formerly of: Was (Not Was)

Hillard "Sweet Pea" Atkinson (September 20, 1945 – May 5, 2020) was an American R&B singer known as one of the vocalists for the band Was (Not Was).

== Biography ==
Atkinson was born in Oberlin, Ohio, and moved to Detroit as a child. He worked at the Chrysler factory, and sang with colleagues in a local band, Hi Energy. He met Don Was in the late 1970s, when he was rehearsing at the studio used by Was.

Atkinson joined Was (Not Was) as joint lead vocalist alongside Harry Bowens. He also featured on some of the band's most successful recordings. In 1982, shortly after the release of the first Was (Not Was) album, he recorded and released his first solo album, Don't Walk Away. The album was co-produced by David and Don Was. In 1997, along with Kris Kristofferson, Atkinson starred in a 15-minute short film included on Don Was' album Forever's a Long, Long Time, which was released under the alias Orquestra Was. Atkinson also performed as lead vocalist on most of the songs on the album, on which Was interprets songs by Hank Williams.

Atkinson later collaborated with guitarist Randy Jacobs, a fellow member of Was (Not Was), in the group the Boneshakers. In a 1997 interview with music magazine Hits, Jacobs recalled that Atkinson had called him in late 1994 after another recording project fell through, prompting the two to begin working together on new material.

The group's debut album, Book of Spells, was released in 1997 on Pointblank Records, a subsidiary of Virgin Records, with Atkinson on vocals and Jacobs on guitar. The original lineup also included Jeff Young on keyboards, Trent Stroh on bass and Denny Weston on drums.

In a July 1997 Los Angeles Times article, music writer Sara Scribner described Jacobs and Atkinson as the co-leaders of the group and highlighted their combination of Detroit soul, rhythm and blues, funk and rock. The article also discussed Atkinson's earlier work with artists including Lyle Lovett, Brian Wilson, Elton John and Bonnie Raitt.

The Boneshakers released their second album, Shake the Planet, in 1999. Reviewing the album in The Washington Post, Geoffrey Himes praised the combination of Atkinson's rhythm-and-blues vocals and Jacobs's rock-funk songwriting.

Atkinson later performed with Jacobs and saxophonist Mindi Abair on the live album Live in Seattle, released in 2015. Two subsequent albums were credited to Mindi Abair and the Boneshakers: The EastWest Sessions (2017) and All I Got for Christmas Is the Blues (2018).

Atkinson also toured for ten years with Lyle Lovett, and sang on recordings by Bonnie Raitt, Bob Dylan, Elton John, Brian Wilson, Willie Nelson, Iggy Pop, Jackson Browne, Jimmy Barnes, and many others.

== Death ==
He died on May 5, 2020, from a heart attack in Los Angeles, aged 74.

== Reviews ==
Robert Christgau gave Don't Walk Away an A− grade, writing, "Trouper that he is, Atkinson will sing any nonsense [the Was brothers] hand him, but he obviously finds his truth in Dionne Warwick, the Tymes, General Johnson, and Eddie Rabbitt, and I'll go along with that." AllMusic's William Ruhlmann gave the album 3 stars out of 5. In his review, Ruhlmann wrote that "For all intents and purposes, this is a Was (Not Was) record" and that "mostly this record has the same sarcastic undercurrent of most of Was (Not Was)'s product."

== Solo discography ==
- Don't Walk Away (Island, 1982)
- Get What You Deserve (2017)

=== Singles ===
- "Dance or Die" (number 27 on Billboard Dance Club Songs, 1982)
