= Don Was =

American musician, producer and record company executive (born 1952)

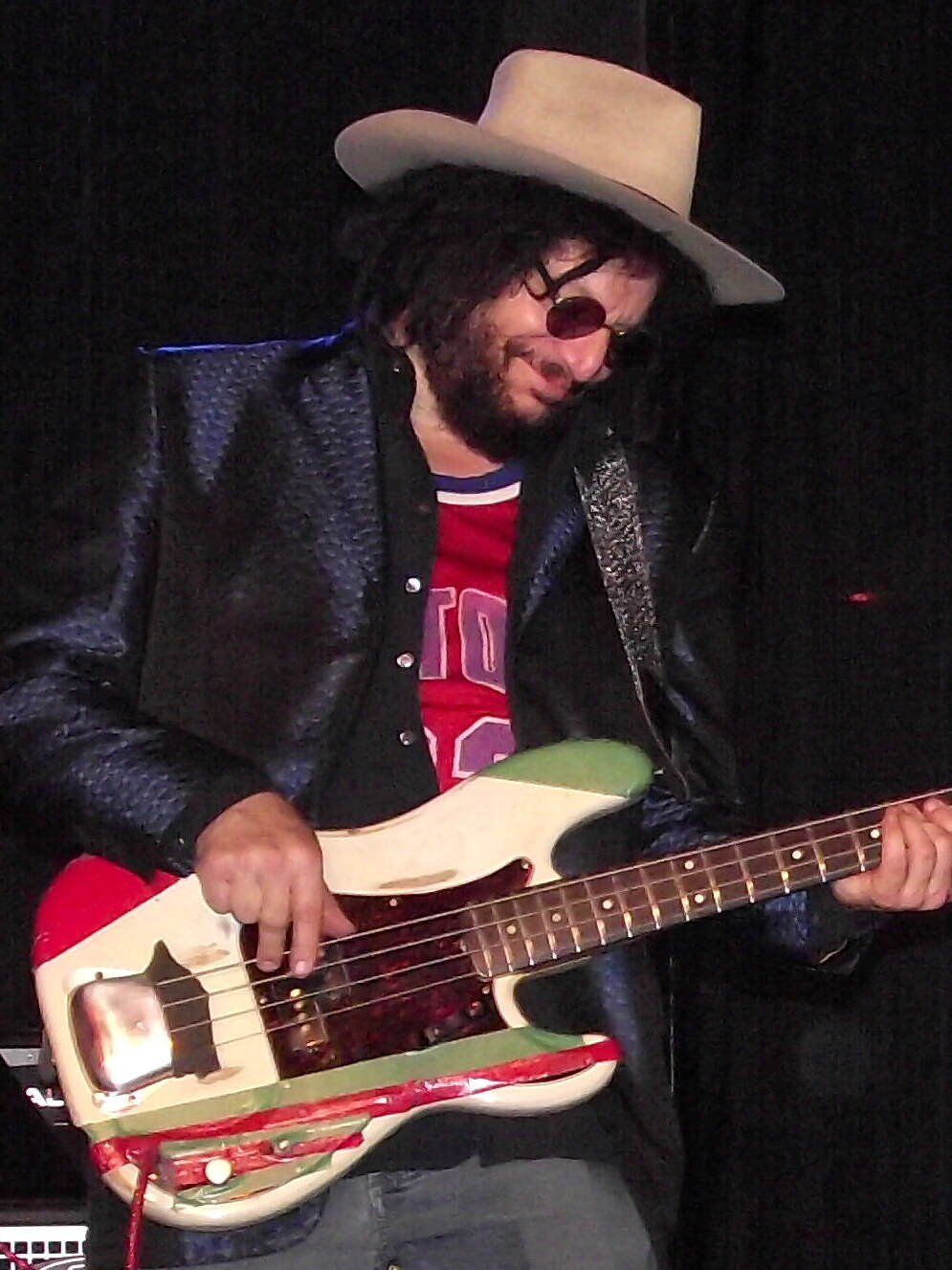
- Don Was performing in Nashville, Tennessee, 2010

Background information
- Born: Don Edward Fagenson; September 13, 1952 (age 73); Detroit, Michigan, U.S.
- Genres: Rock; jazz; blues; funk; jam
- Occupations: Musician; producer; record executive
- Instruments: Bass guitar; guitar; vocals; piano
- Years active: 1971–present
- Formerly of: Was (Not Was); Wolf Bros

Don Edward Fagenson (born September 13, 1952), known professionally as Don Was (/wʌz/), is an American musician, bassist, record producer, music director, film composer, documentary filmmaker and radio host. Since 2011, he has also served as president of the American jazz label Blue Note Records.

For his work as a record producer, he has won six Grammy Awards, including Album of the Year in 1989 for Bonnie Raitt's Nick of Time and Producer of the Year in 1994. In 1995 he produced and directed a documentary about the life of Brian Wilson, I Just Wasn't Made for These Times, that won the San Francisco Film Festival's Golden Gate Award. As a film composer, he won the 1994 British Academy Award (BAFTA) for Best Original Score in recognition of his work on the film Backbeat. He won the 2014 Emmy Award for Outstanding Music Direction for his work on the CBS TV special The Beatles: The Night That Changed America.

Records that he has produced have sold close to 100 million albums for a wide range of artists including The Rolling Stones, Bob Dylan, Willie Nelson, John Mayer, Wayne Shorter, Kris Kristofferson, Iggy Pop, The B-52s, Brian Wilson, Elton John, Garth Brooks and Ryan Adams.

He came to prominence in the 1980s in the band Was (Not Was). He also toured as a member of Bob Weir's Wolf Bros from 2018 until Weir's death in 2026.

== Early life and career ==
Born in Detroit, Was graduated from Oak Park High School in the Detroit suburb of Oak Park, then attended the University of Michigan at Ann Arbor but dropped out after the first year. A journeyman musician, he grew up listening to the Detroit blues sound and the jazz music of John Coltrane and Miles Davis, amongst many others. As a teenager, Was was influenced by 1960s counterculture, most notably John Sinclair.

In high school, Was became the lead singer and guitar player in a Detroit rock band called the Saturns.

Using the stage name "Don Was", he formed the group Was (Not Was) with school friend David Weiss (David Was). The group found commercial success in the 1980s – releasing four albums and logging several hit records. Their biggest hit was "Walk the Dinosaur", from their album What up, Dog? A jazz/R&B album of Hank Williams covers, Forever's A Long, Long Time was released in 1997, under the name Orquestra Was. In 2008, Was (Not Was) reunited for a new album titled Boo! and tour.

Was has received six Grammy Awards including the 1994 Grammy Award for Producer of the Year. He produced several albums for Bonnie Raitt including her Nick of Time album that won the 1989 Grammy Award for Album of the Year. Don also collaborated with co-producer Ziggy Marley, on Family Time, winner of 2009's Best Musical Album For Children. He produced the Rolling Stones' 2016 album Blue and Lonesome, which won the Grammy for Best Traditional Blues album.

He served as music director and/or consultant for several motion pictures such as Thelma and Louise, The Rainmaker, Hope Floats, Phenomenon, Tin Cup, Honeymoon in Vegas, 8 Seconds, Switch, The Freshman, Days of Thunder, Michael, Prêt-à-Porter, Boys on the Side, Toy Story and The Paper. In 2000 Was served as co-Music Director alongside Burt Bachrach for the 72nd Annual Academy Awards.

In 1995, he directed and produced a documentary, I Just Wasn't Made for These Times, about former Beach Boy Brian Wilson. The film debuted at the Sundance Film Festival and won the San Francisco International Film Festival's Golden Gate Award. He also received the British Academy Award (BAFTA) for Best Original Score in recognition of his compositions for the film Backbeat.

Was, a longtime Rolling Stones fan who saw them in concert when he was 12 in 1964, has produced for the band since 1994, working on their albums Voodoo Lounge, Stripped, Bridges to Babylon, Forty Licks, Live Licks, A Bigger Bang, Blue & Lonesome and Hackney Diamonds. He also worked on the Rolling Stones' reissues of Exile on Main Street, released in May 2010, and of Some Girls released in October 2011. Was scoured old master recordings of the albums for lost outtakes, remastering some songs while producing entirely new vocals and tracks on others.

Was also produced the B-52's 1989 album Cosmic Thing, which included their hit "Love Shack".

Since 2008, Was has hosted the proceedings (and led the house band) at the Detroit All-Star Revue, an annual showcase of local acts from the Detroit music scene.

From 2009 to 2012, Don hosted a weekly radio show on Sirius XM satellite radio's Outlaw Country channel called The Motor City Hayride. During the 2011 season of American Idol, Was appeared in several episodes.

In January 2012, he was appointed president of the jazz record label, Blue Note Records in succession to Bruce Lundvall.

He won the 2014 Emmy Award for Outstanding Music Direction for his work on the CBS TV special The Night That Changed America: A Grammy Salute to the Beatles.

On November 18, 2015, at DAR Constitution Hall in Washington, D.C., he led the house band that performed at a concert celebrating Willie Nelson, recipient of the 2015 Library of Congress Gershwin Prize for Popular Song.

In 2018, Was joined former Grateful Dead guitarist Bob Weir and drummer Jay Lane to form Wolf Bros, a trio which undertook a North American tour in the fall of 2018, and continued to perform through 2025.

On April 16, 2021, Was debuted a new radio show, the Don Was Motor City Playlist on WDET-FM, Detroit's NPR station.

Was played bass on the 2021 Bob Dylan recordings of "Blowin' in the Wind," "Masters of War," "The Times They Are A-Changin'," "Simple Twist of Fate," "Gotta Serve Somebody," and "Not Dark Yet" produced by T-Bone Burnett for a one-time sale as Ionic Originals.

In 2023, it was announced that Was would join former Dead & Company members Weir, Lane, Jeff Chimenti, Oteil Burbridge and Mickey Hart as part of Dead Ahead, a four-day festival in Cancún, Mexico in early 2024.

== Personal life ==
Was is the son of Bill Fagenson, a World War II veteran and Bronze Star Medal recipient, who served with the 381st Infantry Regiment of the 96th Infantry Division. Was's sister is Nancy Potok, former Chief Statistician of the United States.

Was is married to former Virgin Records A&R executive and video director Gemma Corfield, and they have three sons, including Tony.

== Selected discography ==
- 1981: Was (Not Was) – Was (Not Was) (bass, synthesizer, vocals, producer)
- 1982: The Beat Goes On – Orbit featuring Carol Hall (co-producer)
- 1983: Born to Laugh at Tornadoes – Was (Not Was) (producer, bass, keyboards, engineer)
- 1984: Breathless – Figures on a Beach (producer)
- 1984: Into the Hot – Floy Joy (producer)
- 1985: Spoiled Girl – Carly Simon (producer)
- 1985: TV Scene – Linda Di Franco (producer)
- 1986 Weak in the Presence of Beauty – Floy Joy (producer)
- 1986 Madness of It All – The Ward Brothers (producer)
- 1986 "Cross That Bridge" – The Ward Brothers (producer)
- 1988: What Up, Dog? – Was (Not Was) (producer, engineer, bass, guitar, keyboards)
- 1989: Nick of Time – Bonnie Raitt (keyboards, producer)
- 1989: Cosmic Thing – The B-52s (producer)
- 1990: Take It to Heart – Michael McDonald (programming, producer, synthesizer, sequencing, synthesizer programming)
- 1990: Brick by Brick – Iggy Pop (producer)
- 1990: Under the Red Sky – Bob Dylan (bass, producer)
- 1990: To Be Continued – Elton John (producer)
- 1991: Khaled – Khaled (producer, bass, keyboards)
- 1991: Are You Okay? – Was (Not Was) (producer, bass, engineer, guitar, vocals)
- 1991: Luck of the Draw – Bonnie Raitt (producer)
- 1991: The Fire Inside – Bob Seger (bass, producer)
- 1992: Kirya – Ofra Haza (producer)
- 1992: Arkansas Traveler – Michelle Shocked (producer)
- 1992: Time Takes Time – Ringo Starr (producer)
- 1992: Good Stuff – The B-52s (producer)
- 1992: Read My Lips – A Thousand Points of Night (one-off side project alias)
- 1992: Strange Weather – Glenn Frey (producer)
- 1992: King of Hearts – Roy Orbison (producer, organ, background vocals)
- 1992: Never Been Rocked Enough – Delbert McClinton (producer)
- 1993: Across the Borderline – Willie Nelson (producer)
- 1993: Thousand Roads – David Crosby (producer)
- 1993: I'm Alive – Jackson Browne (producer)
- 1994: Longing in Their Hearts – Bonnie Raitt (double bass on track 5, producer)
- 1994: Voodoo Lounge – The Rolling Stones (producer)
- 1994: Waymore's Blues (Part II) – Waylon Jennings (producer and bass)
- 1994: Rhythm, Country and Blues – various artists (producer)
- 1995: The Road Goes on Forever – The Highwaymen (producer)
- 1995: MTV Unplugged – Bob Dylan (mixing)
- 1995: I Just Wasn't Made for These Times – Brian Wilson (producer)
- 1995: Road Tested – Bonnie Raitt (producer)
- 1995: Stripped – The Rolling Stones (producer, organ)
- 1996: The Restless Kind – Travis Tritt (producer)
- 1996: Organic – Joe Cocker (producer)
- 1996: El Equilibrio de los Jaguares – Jaguares (producer)
- 1997: Bridges to Babylon – The Rolling Stones (bass, keyboards, executive producer, producer, piano)
- 1997: The Mommyheads – The Mommyheads (co-producer)
- 1998: Undiscovered Soul – Richie Sambora (producer)
- 1999: Suicaine Gratifaction – Paul Westerberg (producer)
- 1999: Spirit of Music – Ziggy Marley (producer)
- 1999: Avenue B – Iggy Pop (producer)
- 1999: Garth Brooks in... the Life of Chris Gaines – Garth Brooks (producer)
- 2000: Maroon – Barenaked Ladies (producer)
- 2001: Lions – The Black Crowes (bass, producer, mixing)
- 2002: The Wide World Over – The Chieftains (producer, bass)
- 2003: Hootie & the Blowfish – Hootie & the Blowfish (producer)
- 2004: Live Licks – The Rolling Stones (producer)
- 2005: Countryman – Willie Nelson (producer)
- 2005: Make Do with What You Got – Solomon Burke (producer)
- 2005: A Bigger Bang – The Rolling Stones (producer, piano)
- 2006: This Old Road – Kris Kristofferson (producer, piano, acoustic and upright bass)
- 2006: Out of the Ashes – Jessi Colter (producer, bass)
- 2006: Fly – Zucchero (producer)
- 2008: Last Days at the Lodge – Amos Lee (producer)
- 2008: Tennessee Pusher – Old Crow Medicine Show (producer)
- 2008: Boo! – Was (Not Was) (producer, engineer, bass, keyboards, drums, vocals)
- 2009: The Excitement Plan – Todd Snider (producer)
- 2009: Shimmer (EP) – Pieta Brown (producer, bass)
- 2009: Acquired Taste – Delbert McClinton (producer)
- 2009: Closer to the Bone – Kris Kristofferson (producer)
- 2009: California Years – Jill Sobule (producer, bass)
- 2010: Y Not – Ringo Starr (bass)
- 2010: Stone Temple Pilots – Stone Temple Pilots (producer)
- 2010: Welder – Elizabeth Cook (producer)
- 2010: The Union – Elton John & Leon Russell (bass)
- 2010: Chocabeck – Zucchero (producer)
- 2011: Wild and Free – Ziggy Marley (producer)
- 2011: The Gate – Kurt Elling (producer)
- 2011: Blessed – Lucinda Williams (producer)
- 2012: Born and Raised – John Mayer (producer)
- 2012: Born to Sing: No Plan B – Van Morrison (producer)
- 2012: La sesion cubana – Zucchero (producer)
- 2013: My True Story – Aaron Neville (co-producer with Keith Richards)
- 2013: Paradise Valley – John Mayer (producer)
- 2013: Una rosa blanca – Zucchero (producer)
- 2014: You Should Be So Lucky – Benmont Tench (bass)
- 2014: Melody Road – Neil Diamond (producer)
- 2014: "All My Friends" concert, January 14, 2014 – a tribute to Gregg Allman (bass)
- 2014: Rester Vivant – Johnny Hallyday (producer)
- 2014: Everlasting – Martina McBride (producer)
- 2014: Enjoy the View – Bobby Hutcherson, David Sanborn, Joey DeFrancesco (producer)
- 2014: Heigh Ho – Blake Mills (bass)
- 2014: All Rise: A Joyful Elegy for Fats Waller – Jason Moran (producer)
- 2015: Yesterday I Had the Blues – Jose James (producer)
- 2015: Duets: Re-working the Catalogue – Van Morrison (producer)
- 2015: No Pier Pressure – Brian Wilson (bass)
- 2015: 1 Hopeful Rd. – Vintage Trouble (producer)
- 2016: Black Cat – Zucchero (producer)
- 2016: Blue & Lonesome – The Rolling Stones (producer)
- 2017: Southern Blood – Gregg Allman (producer)
- 2020: Wednesdays – Ryan Adams (bass, double bass, producer)
- 2021: Big Colors – Ryan Adams (producer)
- 2021: Sob Rock – John Mayer (producer)
- 2021: "Blowin' in the Wind," "Masters of War," "The Times They Are A-Changin' (song)," "Simple Twist of Fate," "Gotta Serve Somebody," and "Not Dark Yet" (bass)
- 2022: Live in Colorado – Bobby Weir & Wolf Bros (double bass)
- 2022: Live in Colorado Vol. 2 – Bobby Weir & Wolf Bros (double bass)
- 2023: Hackney Diamonds – The Rolling Stones (additional producer on "Live by the Sword")
- 2025: Groove in the Face of Adversity – Don Was and the Pan-Detroit Ensemble
