= David Was =

American musician and songwriter

David Jay Weiss, known as David Was, is an American musician, music producer and journalist. With his life-long friend and stage-brother Don Was, he was the founder of the 1980s pop group Was (Not Was).

== Career ==
David was born in Detroit, Michigan to a Jewish family. A graduate of Oak Park High School in the Detroit suburb of Oak Park, Michigan, and later the University of Michigan, Was left his native Detroit for California, and found employment as the jazz critic for the now-defunct Hearst daily the Los Angeles Herald Examiner, where he forged friendships with Sonny Rollins, Miles Davis and Mel Tormé.

With his childhood friend Don Was he went on to form Was (Not Was), composing the lyrics and music and playing various instruments, primarily flute, keyboards and harmonica. Reviewed by The New York Times in 1980 as "the funkier art-funk band," Was (Not Was) used members of Funkadelic, alongside jazz musicians like trumpeter Marcus Belgrave; and singers Mel Tormé and Ozzy Osbourne. They released five albums and enjoyed four Top 10 singles worldwide. Their most recent album, Boo!, was issued in 2008 and ranked among that year's top ten releases on many critics' lists. Their 1989 release, What Up, Dog? featured two top 10 singles, the latter of which, "Walk the Dinosaur," has been re-recorded by Queen Latifah for the animated feature Ice Age: Dawn of the Dinosaurs and has been licensed for use in a half-dozen other feature films.

In other projects, Was produced two soundtrack albums for the X-Files TV show and feature film, as well as music supervised features for Fox and Disney. He joined network music composers on CBS's The Education of Max Bickford, starring Richard Dreyfuss, and also did the music for ABC's That Was Then. His theme music introduced Fox Sports' "NFL Pregame Show" for many years, and another composition precedes every NBA, NHL and MLB game on Fox Sports outlets. As a record producer, he has worked with Bob Dylan, Rickie Lee Jones, Roy Orbison, k.d. lang, Wayne Kramer (of MC5 fame) and the Holly Cole Trio of Canada.

Was has been a regular contributor to National Public Radio's Day to Day and All Things Considered, where he writes and records culturally themed features. As a journalist, he has had bylines in the New York Times, Wall Street Journal, Detroit News, Seattle Post, Entertainment Weekly, Golfweek, Golf and Travel & Golf. He writes a column for Newsweek and contributes to Men's Journal and the LA Daily News.

== See also ==
- Rickie Lee Jones
