= Wham! in China: Foreign Skies =

1986 British documentary film

- Betamax release cover
- Directed by: Lindsay Anderson
- Produced by: Jazz Summers; Simon Napier-Bell; Martin Lewis
- Starring: George Michael; Andrew Ridgeley
- Edited by: Nigel Galt
- Music by: George Michael; Richard Hartley
- Production companies: Big Boys Overseas Ltd; CBS Records
- Distributed by: CBS/Fox Video (original); Sony Music (current)
- Release date: 18 August 1986 (United Kingdom)
- Running time: 60 minutes
- Country: United Kingdom
- Language: English
- Budget: £1 million

Wham! in China: Foreign Skies is a 1986 British documentary film about the English pop duo Wham! consisting of George Michael and Andrew Ridgeley. It follows Wham! on their historic 10-day visit to China during the 1985 world tour when they became the first Western pop act to visit the country. The film is a British venture produced by Big Boys Overseas Limited and CBS Records with CBS/Fox Video serving as distributor.

The film was directed by Lindsay Anderson and produced by Jazz Summers and Martin Lewis. Anderson originally made a film of the tour titled If You Were There; however, this version was never released and the film was remade into Wham! in China: Foreign Skies.

Wham! in China: Foreign Skies was screened at the duo’s last concert held at London's Wembley Stadium on 28 June 1986 and released on home video in the U.K. on 18 August 1986.

== Production ==
=== Development ===
Manager Simon Napier-Bell’s negotiation for the two performances took over 18 months. Napier-Bell used cunning tactics to sabotage the efforts of rock band Queen to be the first to play in China: he made two brochures for the Chinese authorities – one featuring Wham! [Michael] as "wholesome", and one portraying Queen lead singer Freddie Mercury in typically flamboyant poses. The Chinese opted for Wham!.

In December 1984 Wham! set out for their second concert tour, The Big Tour a commercial success, which promoted primarily their second studio album, Make It Big. The concept of filming Foreign Skies began when producer Martin Lewis was busy directing the 1985 documentary about Julian Lennon, titled Stand by Me – A Portrait of Julian Lennon. During a Wham! performance on 14 February 1985 at the Beacon Theatre in New York, he met the duo's co-manager Jazz Summers and discussed the possibility of filming the China tour. When Lewis had permission for the film, it took two weeks to prepare the 35-member international crew, including transportation of a sound desk and super 16 camera equipment.

British director Lindsay Anderson was engaged to accompany Wham! to China in April 1985. The second leg in East Asia began with two concerts in Hong Kong, before moving to China and a concert at the Workers' Gymnasium in Peking on 7 April in front of a crowd of 12,000, who paid about $1.75 each. They also played a concert on 10 April in front of 5,000 in Canton where tickets cost about $5.50 each. The two concerts were played without compensation; however, Wham's visit to China attracted huge media attention across the world. Promotion of the project cost at least $1.5 million which was self-funded, due to Michael wanting artistic control over the film.

=== Post-production ===
The film created by Strathford Hamilton and Andy Morahan was shot over two weeks, was then edited over summer and autumn 1985 in London. Anderson called his one-hour and 18 minute film If You Were There. However, both Napier-Bell and Michael were unimpressed with Anderson's cuts; the former derided the first version as "achingly boring," while Michael interpreted a second revision as "scornful" of Wham!. Both parties additionally perceived the film as being more about China than Wham!: only four songs are featured in the film, and only one of these four is a full performance, with the remaining footage centering predominantly on the Deng Xiaoping administration's reform and opening up policies and their effects on Chinese society. Consequently, Anderson was dismissed in October 1985 by Wham!'s management, the editing team quit, and the film was entirely re-edited, renamed and released as Wham! in China: Foreign Skies.

The original edit of If You Were There has never been screened to the public as public screening of this version was blocked by Michael and his estate. According to a 2006 interview with The Independent, Andy Stephens, manager for Michael, said that Anderson's version was simply not good enough to be shown in public: "It's a dreadful film ... It's 20 years old and it's rubbish. Why on earth should we allow it to be shown?". However, after viewing it in 2008, critic and journalist John Harris described it as "a rich, poetic, panoramic portrait of China's strangeness to the eyes of outsiders". The film's original cut was finally screened publicly for the first time at the BFI Southbank twice, on 25 May and 31 May 2024, with the co-operation of George Michael Entertainment and Andrew Ridgeley.

== Music ==
The soundtrack used in the film was taken from the albums Fantastic and Make It Big. The documentary features some concert footage and studio cut excerpts of the following tracks:

1. "Bad Boys"
2. "Club Tropicana"
3. "Blue" (concert footage)
4. "Wake Me Up Before You Go-Go"
5. "A Ray of Sunshine"
6. "Young Guns (Go for It)"
7. "Careless Whisper" (concert footage)
8. "Everything She Wants" (concert footage)
9. "Like a Baby"
10. "If You Were There"
11. "Runaway" (backstage rehearsal)
12. "Love Machine" (concert footage)

== Release ==
The world premiere of Wham! in China: Foreign Skies was shown at London's Wembley Stadium on large video screens on Saturday 28 June 1986 before The Final began. With an audience of 72,000; this set a record for the largest audience at a film premiere.

=== Home media ===
It was released on VHS, Betamax and LaserDisc in the United Kingdom on 18 August 1986. The video release reached #1 on the UK Music Video chart compiled by Spotlight Research on 6 September 1986 and stayed at the top for 8 consecutive weeks until the chart ending 1 November 1986.

Only one track "Blue (Live in China)" from the film was released on their studio album Music from the Edge of Heaven. In the United States the video retailed at $19.98 and debuted at number 8 on Billboard's Top Music Videocassettes chart, for the week ending 25 October 1986 and climbed to number 4, two weeks later. As the video started to climb up the chart, and for the week ending 6 December 1986, it reached number 1, replacing The #1 Video Hits by Whitney Houston. Wham! in China: Foreign Skies was the sixteenth best-selling music videocassette for 1986. It was present on the top 20 chart for a total of 17 weeks until February 1987. The video was certified gold in April 1987 by the Recording Industry Association of America (RIAA) for shipment of 50,000 copies.

== Charts ==
Chart (1986)	Peak position
UK Music Video (Spotlight Research)	1
US Top Music Videocassettes (Billboard)	1

== Certifications ==
Region	Certification	Certified units/sales
United States (RIAA)	Gold	50,000^{^}
^{^} Shipments figures based on certification alone.

== Credits ==
- Executive Producers: Jazz Summers and Simon Napier-Bell
- Musical Production and Arrangement: George Michael
- Additional Music: Richard Hartley
- Supervising Editor: Peter Davies
- Editor: Nigel Galt
- Assistant Editors: Peter Culverwell, Len Tremble, Mark Mostyn, Finn Arden
- Director of Photography: David Myers
- Photography: Peter Mackay, Paul Goldsmith, Lee Kenower, Dennis Smith, Alvin Allen
- Assistant Cameramen: George Stephenson, Paul Cameron, Leslie Otis, Bobby Shepherd
- Camera Technician: Ernest Jew
- Gaffer: James Sofranko
- Documentary Lighting Director: Michael Lesser
- Song Mixing: Chris Porter
- Sound Editor: Alan Plaey
- Re-recording Mixer: Dean Humphries
- Documentary Sound: Paul Rusnak
- Lighting Designer: Jonathon Smeeton
- Associate Producer: Michael Owen
- Post-production Supervisor: Sarah O’Brien
- Assistant Director: Steven Bull
- Location Manager: Joel Hinman
- Make-up: Melanie Panos
- Wardrobe: Yioda Panos
- Titles: Optical Film Effects

== See also ==
- Wham! 10 Days in China
- Wham! (2023 film)
- George Michael: A Different Story
- Wham! discography
- The Big Tour
- List of British films of 1986
