= Wham! (film) =

2023 documentary film by Chris Smith

- Cinema release poster
- Directed by: Chris Smith
- Produced by: Simon Halfon; Chris Smith; John Battsek
- Starring: George Michael; Andrew Ridgeley; (See below)
- Edited by: Gregor Lyon
- Music by: Tim Atack
- Production companies: Ventureland; Passion Pictures; Nemperor Production; Library Films
- Distributed by: Netflix; Altitude Film Distribution
- Release dates: 17 June 2023 (DocFest); 27 June 2023 (United Kingdom); 5 July 2023 (worldwide)
- Running time: 92 minutes
- Country: United Kingdom
- Language: English

Wham! is a 2023 British documentary film about the English pop duo Wham! consisting of George Michael and Andrew Ridgeley. The film marks the 40th anniversary of their 1983 debut album Fantastic. Directed by Chris Smith, it relies primarily on rare archive footage and audio interviews by the duo, including television appearances, concert footage, private home video, behind-the-scenes outtakes, and family comments all linked together using scrapbooks created by Ridgeley's mother. The film was co-produced by Ventureland / Passion Pictures, Nemperor Production, and Library Films, with Altitude Film and Netflix serving as distributors.

Wham! had its world premiere at the Sheffield DocFest on 17–18 June 2023, and given a limited theatrical release in the United Kingdom on 27 June. It was reviewed as a cleverly stitched together film, using audio posthumously of Michael and new audio from Ridgeley. It was released worldwide to stream on 5 July 2023, on Netflix and received generally positive reviews from critics. The film was nominated for a BAFTA Award for Best Documentary.

== Synopsis ==
Wham! begins with Ridgeley and Michael who first met at Bushey Meads School in 1975 when they were 12 and 11 years old, respectively. It covers the journey of the pop duo featuring home videos and never-before-seen archive footage. The film is all framed together using a large series of scrapbooks with articles and photos documented by Ridgeley's mother throughout the film. It discusses how they put together their first demo tape with a full version of "Wham Rap! (Enjoy What You Do)" and a portion of "Careless Whisper" recorded in Ridgeley's front room, eventually signing a record deal with Innervision Records in March 1982.

An important turning point for the band after the release of their debut single "Wham Rap! (Enjoy What You Do)" (which failed to enter the UK Singles Chart) was an opportunity to appear on Top of the Pops in November 1982 performing "Young Guns (Go for It)", which rose in the chart from number 42, eventually reaching number 3. Wham! follow up with a reissue of "Wham Rap!", charting at number 8, and "Bad Boys", charting at number 2. "Club Tropicana" sees the duo fly to the Spanish island of Ibiza, their first music video shoot abroad. It was filmed at Pikes Hotel with Ridgeley describing it as being more in line with their intended image. The single becomes a chart success in Europe.

Wham! later sign to Epic Records with Simon Napier-Bell as their manager due to a dispute with Innervision. In 1984, the band went to Studio Miraval in Southern France to record their second studio album Make It Big. They discuss the big success of their first number 1 single "Wake Me Up Before You Go-Go" and how Michael was inspired by a note Ridgeley had left on his bedroom door for his mother to wake him up the next morning. In late 1984, Michael describes how he felt attending the event to record Band Aid's "Do They Know It's Christmas?" at Sarm West Studios, which would coincide with the release of their own single "Last Christmas", showing outtakes from the "Last Christmas" video shoot filmed in Saas-Fee, Switzerland.

It concludes with Ridgeley and Michael reflecting on their sell-out farewell concert the Final on 28 June 1986 at Wembley Stadium. The film ends with unseen alternative music video footage of "I'm Your Man", with the song playing over the credits.

== Production ==
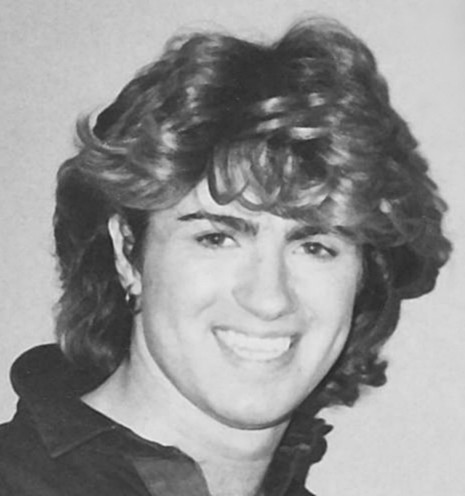
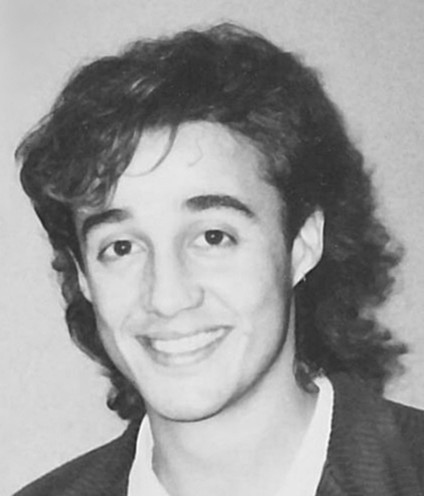
George Michael (left) and Andrew Ridgeley (right), c. 1985

=== Development ===
The initial concept for a documentary film was when Ridgeley contacted co-producer Simon Halfon about the idea, around the same time as Ridgeley's 2019 memoir Wham! George & Me. Halfon then pitched the project to Kate Townsend, the VP for original feature documentaries at Netflix and John Battsek. In June 2022, it was announced that a documentary film about the band Wham! was in production and had the official support of Ridgeley, with Chris Smith signed on to direct. The official social media of Ridgeley and Michael announced and asked the public for any footage they may have.

In the early stages of the project, Smith said that he approached it with the possibility of using on-screen interviews, however, during the editing process, Smith had decided to use a variety of archive interviews of Michael throughout the years and a new audio interview from Ridgeley. Smith, Lyons (editor), Halfon (producer), and Black (archive producer) spent a number of days in Ridgeley's studio during the recording. According to Smith, one of the biggest surprises were the scrapbooks (around 50), that Ridgeley's mother put together documenting the entire four years.

Among the tapes of archival material of varying quality discovered and located by the team was a VHS tape of their 1983 Hammersmith Odeon concert from the Club Fantastic Tour owned by Wham! bass player Dave West. This was found not long before the film's completion. Also available were the original demos of "Wham Rap!" and "Careless Whisper" recorded by Paul Mex for their eventual record contract. Finding footage for the Final concert was also an important inclusion.

The film restoration was performed by R3store Studios in London to clean and scan the archive material, with many reels untouched for 40 years. They also restored large portions of Wham! in China, the 1986 documentary film. During the post-production editing process, some material that did not make the final cut was footage of Wham! visiting the United States for the first time in 1983 to perform on television shows.

=== Music ===
Composer Tim Atack was in charge of the film's musical score. Studio cut excerpts used and concert footage of the following tracks in order:

- "Wham Rap! (Enjoy What You Do)"
- "Young Guns (Go for It)" (Top of the Pops performance)
- "Bad Boys"
- "Club Tropicana"
- "Nothing Looks the Same in the Light"
- "A Ray of Sunshine"
- "Good Times" (concert)
- "Wake Me Up Before You Go-Go"
- "Freedom"
- "Careless Whisper" (alternative music video footage)
- "Everything She Wants" (alternative music video footage)
- "Last Christmas" (music video outtakes)
- "Do They Know It's Christmas?" (behind the scenes)
- "Don't Let the Sun Go Down on Me" (Live Aid in 1985 with Elton John)
- "The Edge of Heaven"
- "I'm Your Man" (alternative music video footage)

== Release ==
Wham! held its world premiere at the Crucible Theatre in Sheffield, England for the 30th Sheffield DocFest on 17 June 2023 with a Q&A session after the screening with the film's director Chris Smith and Wham! member Andrew Ridgeley, both via video call. On 18 June it was given another DocFest preview at the Showroom Cinema’s Warner Chappell Production Music screen. An advanced BAFTA screening followed on 20 June 2023 with Smith, Halfon, Battsek, Ridgeley and Wham! backing singer Shirlie Holliman in attendance for a Q&A session hosted Anna Higgs at BAFTA's Piccadilly headquarters in London. Further screenings with Smith in attendance followed in June at the Paris Theater in Manhattan and July at the Bay Theater in Palisades Village, Pacific Palisades, Los Angeles.

Wham! was released theatrically on 27 June 2023, in the United Kingdom by Altitude Film Distribution and was released on Netflix on 5 July 2023.

=== Marketing ===
An official trailer was released on 15 June 2023 and featured the songs "Wham Rap! (Enjoy What You Do)" and "Wake Me Up Before You Go-Go". While no official soundtrack for the film has been issued, a compilation album on various formats was released two days after the documentary film The Singles: Echoes from the Edge of Heaven.

=== Audience viewership ===
According to Netflix, Wham! was watched by 4.4 million people in its first five days of digital release worldwide in any language and ranked 8th for the most watched TV and film. It was the most-watched film in the United Kingdom debuting at number one for the week ending on 9 July 2023. It also reached the top ten most-viewed film list in 23 countries during the same week including Ireland, Greece, Cyprus, Australia, New Zealand, Denmark, Malta, Iceland, Belgium, Netherlands and Canada. The following week 10–16 July 2023, the film was the second most-watched film in the U.K. and Ireland and remained as a top 10 film in eight other countries.

== Reception ==
=== Critical response ===
Upon its premiere at the 2023 Sheffield DocFest, the film received positive reviews from critics. On the review aggregator website Rotten Tomatoes, 87% of 46 critics' reviews are positive, with an average rating of 7.0/10. The website's consensus reads: "While Wham! may mostly appeal to those familiar with shoulder pads and cassette tapes, it's hard not to swing along to this tribute pop-umentary about George Michael and Andrew Ridgeley." On Metacritic, the film holds a weighted average score of 73 out of 100 based on 16 critics, indicating "generally favorable reviews".

Metacritic review
breakdown (unweighted)

Positive
13 (81%)
Mixed
3 (19%)
Negative
0 (0%)

Screen International film critic Fionnuala Halligan wrote, "The quality is far above the norm for this type of memoir assemblage, even if the substance is full of air bubbles..." In a positive 4/5 star review for the London Evening Standard, El Hunt called it an "illuminating film" with it being "cleverly stitched together and drawing on a vast archive of audio recordings, their narrative does not shy away from reappraising the band's past and even calling themselves out." Wendy Ide of The Observer gave the film 4 stars out of 5, saying, "The film, which creates a dialogue between recent interviews with Ridgeley and older archive recordings of Michael, pays tribute to the close bond between the two Bushey Meads school friends who found themselves living the dream."

Nick Hilton of The Independent was critical of the film, rating the film two of five stars saying, "Wham! inadvertently becomes a music documentary without much interest in music. Like the band themselves, this is a breezy watch, but if there's profundity beneath the perms and the cut-offs, the film struggles to find it." Robert Moran from The Sydney Morning Herald felt the film was "as bright as the band's short-shorts and as satisfying as their enduring hits."

San Francisco Chronicle's Mick LaSalle wrote that Wham! "tells a sweet story, but also a goofy and entertaining one, because these guys were more '80s than anybody, more even than Miami Vice and Duran Duran", giving it 3 out of 4 marks. Chicago Sun-Times's Richard Roeper wrote that "the end result is a feel-good documentary about a feel-good band who were never destined for a decades-long run but had one hell of a good time dancing at the top of the pop charts for a few crazy years", rating the film three of four stars. Kevin Harley, writing for the Radio Times gave it 3 stars, saying, "While the film can seem somewhat shallow, it works best as a warmly nostalgic celebration of fleeting youth and friendship." Debiparna Chakraborty from Far Out gave it 3.5 out of 5 stars, writing "...the documentary acts as a vehicle for nostalgia, celebrating the effervescence of youth and the mercurial nature of fame." Christy Lemire of RogerEbert.com described it as "a total blast, regardless of your level of fandom. On the most superficial level, it's just a joy to relive this time of pop culture excess and sing along with these insanely catchy tunes."

=== Awards and nominations ===
Award	Date of ceremony	Category	Recipient(s) and nominee(s)	Result	Ref.
British Academy Television Awards	18 February 2024	Best Documentary	Wham!	Nominated	
FOCAL International Awards	20 June 2024	Best Use of Footage in a Cinematic Feature	Wham! Ventureland / Library Films / Nemperor	Won	
FOCAL International Awards	20 June 2024	Best Use of Footage in a Music Production	Wham! Ventureland / Library Films / Nemperor	Nominated	
Golden Reel Awards	3 March 2024	Outstanding Achievement in Music Editing – Documentary	Wham! Music Editor: Greg Gettens	Nominated	
Golden Trailer Awards	30 May 2024	Best Foreign Documentary	Wham! "Greatness", Netflix, Ignition Creative London	Nominated	

== See also ==
- Wham! 10 Days in China
- Wham! in China: Foreign Skies
- George Michael: A Different Story
- George Michael: The Faith Tour
