= The Singles: Echoes from the Edge of Heaven =

Greatest hits album by Wham!
- Released: 7 July 2023
- Recorded: 1982–1986
- Length: 77:11; 164:03 (expanded edition)
- Label: Sony Music
- Producers: George Michael; Bob Carter; Steve Brown

Wham! chronology
Last Christmas: The Original Motion Picture Soundtrack (2019)	The Singles: Echoes from the Edge of Heaven (2023)	Wham! 10 Days in China – The Live EP (2026)

The Singles: Echoes from the Edge of Heaven is the fourth compilation album by English pop duo Wham!, released on 7 July 2023 through Sony Music. It was released in a variety of formats in commemoration of the 40th anniversary of the duo's formation. The compilation's standard physical and digital versions contain the duo's singles in chronological order that were released from 1982 to 1986, with the exception of "Club Fantastic Megamix" (although it is included on the expanded version) and "Careless Whisper" (partially credited to Wham! in some regions upon release in 1984), along with several B-sides. The expanded digital version adds 17 tracks, made up of different mixes of the singles, which are included across the separate singles in the CD and seven-inch vinyl box sets. The compilation was released two days following the Netflix release of the 2023 documentary film Wham!

== Background ==
Andrew Ridgeley stated that he "really enjoyed the process of reviewing our career from this point of time and getting a sense of how much fun it was", calling being part of Wham! "almost exclusively a joyful and positive period in both our lives. It had a beginning, middle, and an end – so it makes a great story".

== Critical reception ==
Professional ratings
Review scores
Source	Rating
Retropop Magazine	4/5 stars

Retropop Magazine stated that the compilation "brings together Wham!'s impeccable run of hit records" and also "showcas[es] Wham!'s knack for crafting and delivering hit after hit and scoring such tremendous worldwide success in just half a decade".

== Track listing ==
All tracks are written by and produced by George Michael, except where noted.

The Singles: Echoes from the Edge of Heaven track listing
No.	Title	Writer(s)	Producer(s)	Length
1.	"Wham Rap! (Enjoy What You Do)" (from Fantastic, 1983)	Michael; Andrew Ridgeley	Bob Carter	3:31
2.	"Young Guns (Go for It)" (from Fantastic)		Steve Brown; Michael	3:42
3.	"Bad Boys" (from Fantastic)		Brown; Michael	3:21
4.	"Club Tropicana" (from Fantastic)	Michael; Ridgeley	Brown; Michael	4:30
5.	"Wake Me Up Before You Go-Go" (from Make It Big, 1984)			3:53
6.	"Freedom" (from Make It Big)			5:04
7.	"Last Christmas" (single version) (from Music from the Edge of Heaven, 1986)			4:25
8.	"Everything She Wants" (from Make It Big)			5:30
9.	"I'm Your Man" (non-album single, 1985; also from Music from the Edge of Heaven)			4:06
10.	"The Edge of Heaven" (from Music from the Edge of Heaven)			4:36
11.	"Where Did Your Heart Go?" (from Music from the Edge of Heaven)	Don Was; Dave Was		5:49
12.	"Blue (Armed with Love)" (from "Club Tropicana" single, 1983)			3:55
13.	"A Ray of Sunshine" (instrumental remix) (from Fantastic)		Michael; Brown	5:39
14.	"Freedom" (long mix)			7:09
15.	"Everything She Wants" (remix)			6:30
16.	"Battlestations" (from Music from the Edge of Heaven)			5:31
Total length:				77:11

Digital expanded edition track listing
No.	Title	Writer(s)	Producer(s)	Length
1.	"Wham Rap! (Enjoy What You Do)"	Michael; Ridgeley	Carter	3:31
2.	"Wham Rap! (Enjoy What You Do?)" (club mix)	Michael; Ridgeley	Carter	4:02
3.	"Wham Rap! (Enjoy What You Do?)" (social mix)	Michael; Ridgeley	Carter	6:44
4.	"Wham Rap! (Enjoy What You Do?)" (unsocial mix)	Michael; Ridgeley	Carter	6:37
5.	"Wham Rap! (Enjoy What You Do?)" (special U.S. remix)	Michael; Ridgeley	Carter	6:40
6.	"Wham Rap! (Enjoy What You Do?)" (special club remix)	Michael; Ridgeley	Carter	3:04
7.	"Young Guns (Go for It)"		Brown; Michael	3:42
8.	"Going for It!"		Brown; Michael	4:49
9.	"Young Guns (Go for It!)" (12" mix)		Brown; Michael	6:56
10.	"Bad Boys"		Brown; Michael	3:21
11.	"Bad Boys" (instrumental)		Brown; Michael	3:23
12.	"Club Tropicana"	Michael; Ridgeley	Brown; Michael	4:30
13.	"Blue (Armed with Love)"			3:55
14.	"Club Tropicana" (instrumental)	Michael; Ridgeley	Brown; Michael	3:31
15.	"Club Fantastic Megamix" (non-album single, 1983)		Brown; Michael	3:57
16.	"A Ray of Sunshine" (instrumental remix)		Michael; Brown	5:39
17.	"Wake Me Up Before You Go-Go"			3:53
18.	"Wake Me Up Before You Go-Go" (instrumental)			4:02
19.	"Freedom (UK 7")"			5:04
20.	"Freedom" (instrumental)			5:20
21.	"Freedom" (long version)			7:09
22.	"Last Christmas" (single version)			4:25
23.	"Everything She Wants (short remix)"			5:30
24.	"Last Christmas" (pudding mix)			6:46
25.	"Everything She Wants (long remix)"			6:30
26.	"I'm Your Man"			4:06
27.	"Do It Right" (instrumental)			4:04
28.	"I'm Your Man" (extended stimulation)			6:58
29.	"I'm Your Man" (accapella)			4:17
30.	"The Edge of Heaven"			4:36
31.	"Wham! Rap '86"	Michael; Ridgeley		6:35
32.	"Battlestations"			5:31
33.	"Where Did Your Heart Go?"	Don Was; Dave Was		5:49
Total length:				164:03

Notes

- "Blue (Armed with Love)" is listed as "Blue (Armed)" in the separate CD singles box set.
- "Going for It!" is listed as "Go for It!" in the digital expanded edition. "Going For It!" is an instrumental version of "Young Guns (Go for It!)".
- "Do It Right" is an instrumental version of "I'm Your Man".

== Charts ==
Chart performance for The Singles: Echoes from the Edge of Heaven
Chart (2023–2024)	Peak position
Australian Albums (ARIA)	23
Austrian Albums (Ö3 Austria)	35
Belgian Albums (Ultratop Flanders)	9
Belgian Albums (Ultratop Wallonia)	4
Canadian Albums (Billboard)	33
Dutch Albums (Album Top 100)	10
French Albums (SNEP)	59
German Albums (Offizielle Top 100)	12
Hungarian Albums (MAHASZ)	39
Irish Albums (IRMA)	12
Italian Albums (FIMI)	56
New Zealand Albums (RMNZ)	22
Polish Albums (ZPAV)	73
Portuguese Albums (AFP)	4
Scottish Albums (Official Charts)	2
Spanish Albums (Promusicae)	35
Swiss Albums (Schweizer Hitparade)	17
UK Albums (Official Charts)	2
US Billboard 200	31

== Certifications ==
Region	Certification	Certified units/sales
New Zealand (RMNZ)	Gold	7,500^{‡}
United Kingdom (BPI)	Silver	60,000^{^}
United Kingdom (BPI) Sales since 2023	Gold	100,000^{‡}
^{^} Shipments figures based on certification alone.^{‡} Sales+streaming figures based on certification alone.
