= Wham! 10 Days in China =

2026 British documentary film

- Cinema release poster
- Directed by: Mike Christie
- Produced by: Alice Popplewell
- Starring: George Michael; Andrew Ridgeley
- Edited by: Xanna Ward-Dixon
- Music by: Dru Masters
- Production companies: Supercollider; Sony Music Vision
- Distributed by: Trafalgar Releasing
- Release date: 28 July 2026 (United Kingdom)
- Running time: 90 minutes
- Country: United Kingdom
- Language: English
- Box office: $369,971

Wham! 10 Days in China is a 2026 British documentary film about the English musical duo Wham!, focused on their 1985 visit to China. Directed by Mike Christie and produced by Supercollider of the Zinc Media Group and Sony Music Vision in association with Sony Music Entertainment UK and the BBC, the 90-minute film consists of "newly restored footage" and personal interviews with Andrew Ridgeley, "members of the touring party", and fans.

Wham! 10 Days in China was reviewed as reassembled and revivified having brilliant results. It was given a limited theatrical release worldwide on 28 July 2026 and received generally positive reviews from critics.

== Background ==
The idea for the visit was to help Wham! achieve mainstream commercial interest in the American market without a lengthy tour. Co-managers Simon Napier-Bell and Jazz Summers correctly calculated that this would produce publicity across the United States. Wham! manager Simon Napier-Bell negotiated for over 18 months for the two concerts using cunning tactics to sabotage the efforts of rock band Queen to be the first to play in China: he made brochures for the Chinese authorities – one featuring Wham! [Michael] as "wholesome", and one portraying Queen lead singer Freddie Mercury in typically flamboyant poses. In early April Wham! had performed at the Coliseum in British Hong Kong.

In 1985, Wham! performed in China as part of their 1984–85 tour, the Big Tour. The duo, which consisted of George Michael and Andrew Ridgeley, became the first Western pop group to visit the country. During their 10-day visit, the duo performed concerts in Beijing and Guangzhou (Canton) on 7 and 10 April 1985 respectively.

Director Lindsay Anderson was approached to film Wham!'s visit and performances for a home video release. A version of the film (titled If You Were There) was cut by Anderson, but was rejected by the group, who thought that it focused more on everyday life in the Communist-ruled country rather than the duo themselves. Eventually, Anderson was dismissed, and Michael and director Andy Morahan took over to re-edit the film, which would be renamed Wham! in China: Foreign Skies.

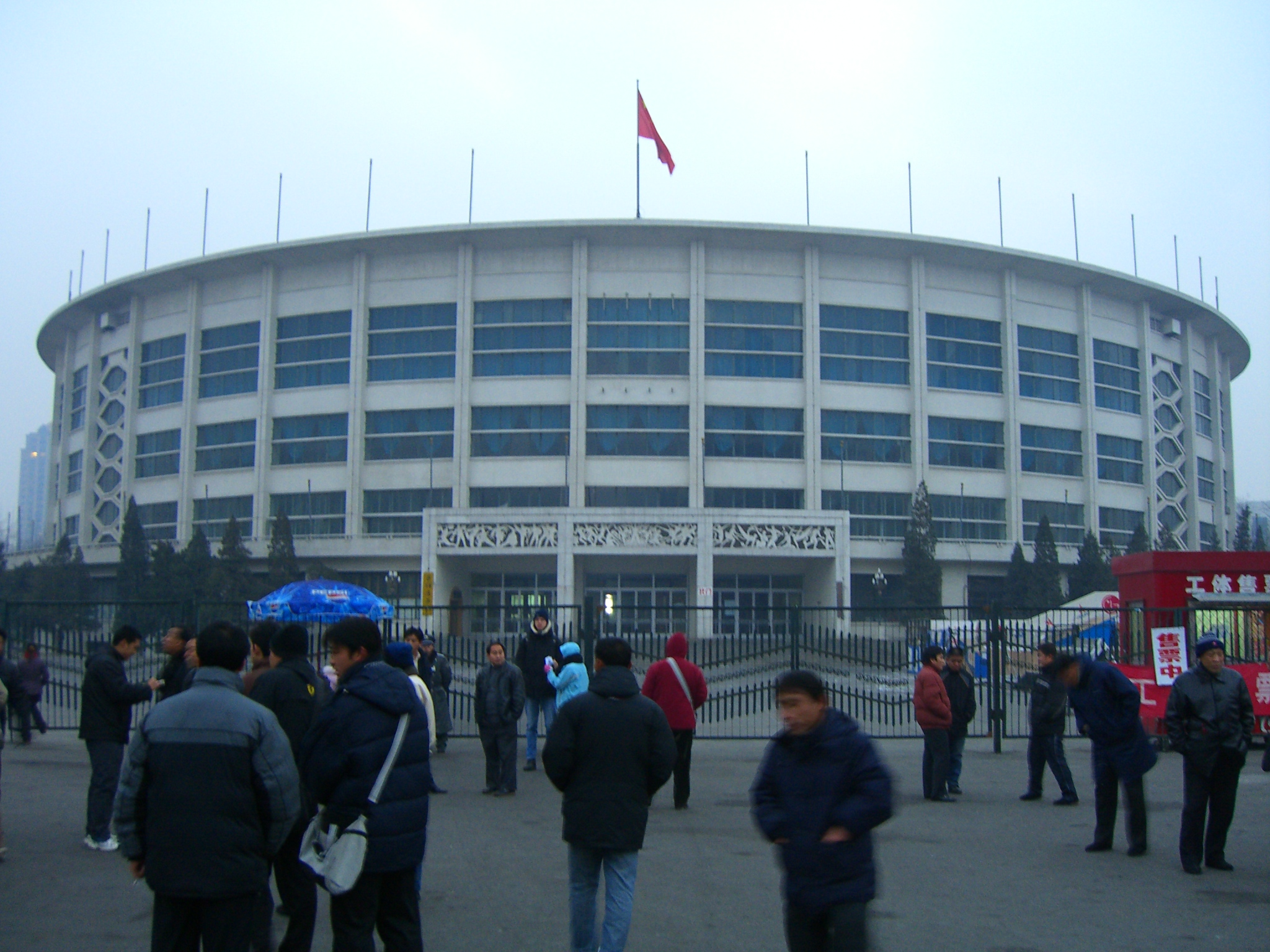
Workers' Gymnasium, Beijing was the venue for 7 April 1985.

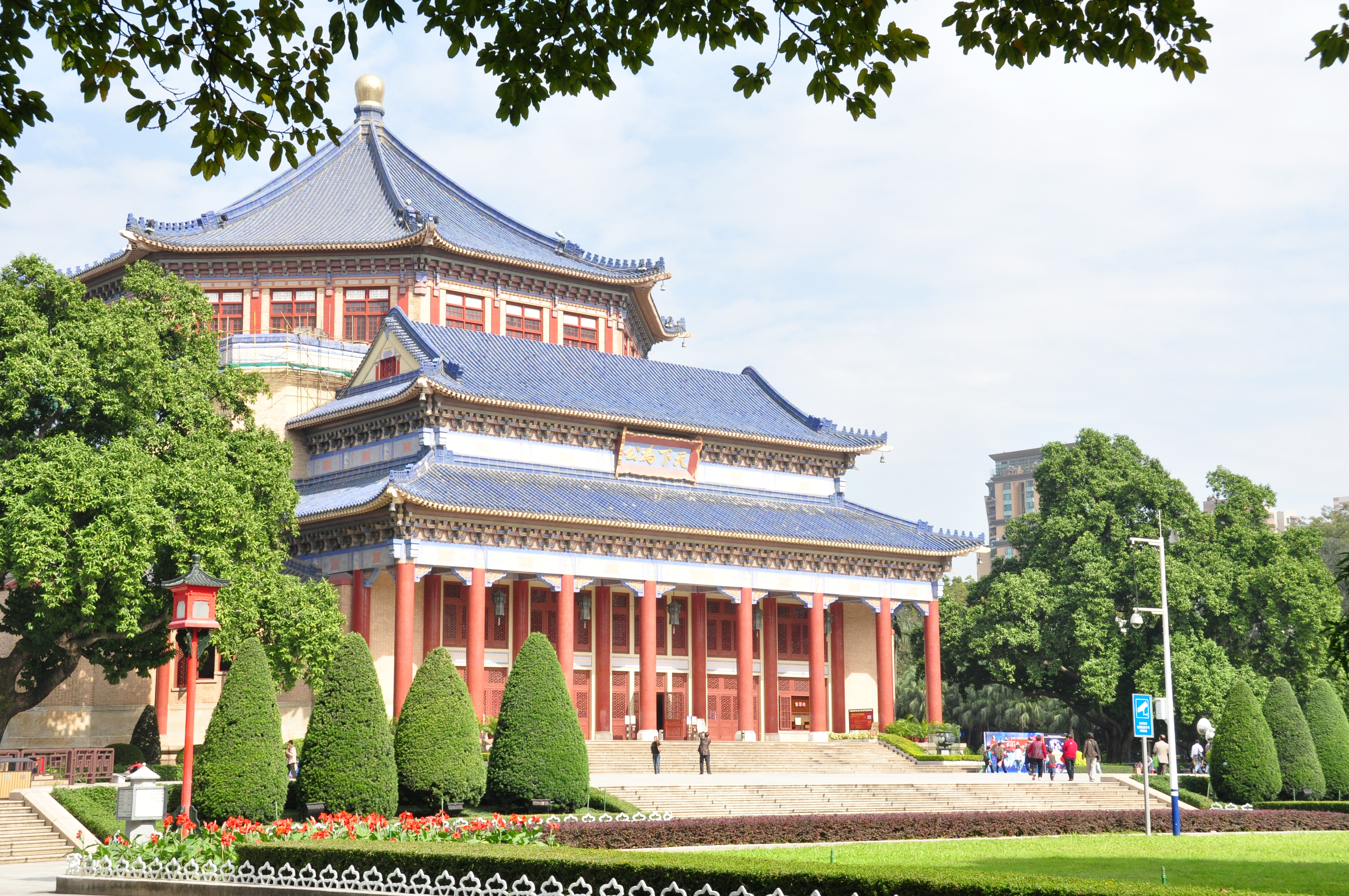
Sun Yat-sen Memorial Hall, Canton, the venue for 10 April.

Just four months later in the summer of 1985, the duo begun their Whamamerica! tour across the United States and Canada.

Foreign Skies premiered at Wham!'s farewell concert on 28 June 1986. After public screening of Anderson's cut was blocked by Michael and his estate, If You Were There was finally screened publicly at the BFI Southbank twice in May 2024, with the co-operation of George Michael Entertainment and Ridgeley.

== Production ==
=== Development ===
The concept for a documentary film was by director Mike Christie who initially approached Ridgeley about the idea in early 2023 and then needing approval from the George Michael Estate for another perspective of the tour which was near to its 40th anniversary. Ridgeley had not been back to China since the original visit in April 1985.

Christie begun the process in September 2024 with new in-depth interviews being filmed in the United Kingdom, United States and China of those previously involved in the tour, including members of the band, original journalists, management, road crew, documentary crew and members of the audience. Around 60 to 70 hours of interviews were shot. The new interview with Ridgeley was shot over two and half days in a theatre in Greenwich, England in December 2024. Some of the Chinese interviews included singer Cheng Fangyuan who recorded a few Wham! tracks in Chinese released on cassette and singer Cui Jian who attended a concert.

The archive footage which was stored away for decades had more than 20 hours of film rushes on Super 16mm film, most of which are largely unseen and with some parts being extensively cut due to the previous documentaries. There were over 100 cans of film reels archived. The audio files were separate to the footage and were slowly synced together. Overall, the restoration, transfer and syncing audio multi-tracks creating a 5.1 mix took seven months. According to Christie, the new film is made completely from unseen footage with no clips included from the two previous documentaries. The film is presented in the same aspect ratio as the original film recording to preserve the feeling of the past.

In March 2026, it was announced that a documentary film about the band’s visit to China was produced with the involvement of Ridgeley, and Mike Christie as director.

The documentary uses four tracks, however, a total of 24-tracks of live audio were remixed for surround sound by Ridgeley and Chris Porter including the restoration. According to Christie, during the live recordings some of the cameras were not directed but were still rolling, with some songs having no visuals due to the camera magazines being changed at the same time.

=== Music ===
Composer Dru Masters was in charge of the film's musical score.

== Release ==
Wham! 10 Days in China held a press screening at Soho House in London, England on 14 July 2026 and a Q&A session after the viewing with the film's director Mike Christie, Wham! member Andrew Ridgeley and television presenter Edith Bowman. Wham! 10 Days in China was released in cinemas worldwide on 28 July 2026 by Trafalgar Releasing with the television premiere broadcast in the United Kingdom on BBC Two and BBC Music on 29 August 2026.

=== Home media ===
In September, the film was released on digital on a variety of platforms.

== Reception ==
=== Box office ===
Wham! 10 Days in China grossed £239,475 ($324,097) in the United Kingdom and $45,874 in other territories, for a worldwide total of £272,000 ($369,971).

=== Critical response ===
On the review aggregator website Rotten Tomatoes, 100% of 17 critics' reviews are positive, with an average rating of 8.1/10. On Metacritic, the film holds a weighted average score of 76 out of 100 based on 5 critics, indicating "generally favorable reviews". Hilary White of Irish Independent gave the film 4 stars out of 5, wrote "With so much going on, from the madcap incidents aboard the travelling rodeo – everything from “old world” officialdom to self-harm – to the broader contextual themes, Christie does fine work composing it all into shape."

Kevin Maher of The Times gave the film four stars, calling it "quite brilliant" and writing that its "jaw-to-the-floor moments are smartly collated by the director Mike Christie". He described it as "easily the best" of the recent documentaries about Wham! and George Michael, adding that he wished the film were longer. Phil de Semlyen of Time Out gave the film 4 out of 5 stars, praising the surprising influence of the China tour, writing that the film "is not made specifically for Wham! fans, although the gig footage showcases the band at their exuberant ‘Careless Whisper’ and ‘Freedom’-era peak. Where it really sings is in revealing the unexpected legacy of this legendary tour." Stewart Clarke of Deadline Hollywood praised the band members "even when they’re at odds, is the bond between the two Wham! stars." He felt that the "new film captures 10 days that became a pivotal part of their story and a bona fide moment in pop history".

The New York Times film critic Glenn Kenny described it as "The concert scenes remind the viewer of how Wham! got so big in the first place — Michael was an undeniably phenomenal singer and stage presence." In a review for The Daily Telegraph, James Hall wrote, "the fascinating thing about Wham!’s Chinese escapade is that everyone involved had wildly conflicting agendas: Michael and Ridgeley (then just 21 and 22) did it for US exposure; China did it to look tolerant, describing it as "very funny" in parts. Also writing for the Telegraph (UK), Helen Brown gave Wham! 10 Days in China four of five stars, calling it "A strange, surreal film". Lars Brandle of Billboard said it was a "time capsule" and a "fish-out-of-water film and a glimpse through the Bamboo Curtain".

== Wham! 10 Days in China – The Live EP ==
Wham! 10 Days in China – The Live EP

Live album / EP by Wham!
- Released: 4 December 2026
- Recorded: 7–10 April 1985
- Venues: Workers' Gymnasium, Beijing; Sun Yat-sen Memorial Hall, Guangzhou
- Genre: Pop
- Label: Sony
- Producer: Chris Porter

Wham! chronology
The Singles: Echoes from the Edge of Heaven (2023)	Wham! 10 Days in China – The Live EP (2026)

In August 2026, it was announced that an accompanying EP entitled Wham! 10 Days in China – The Live EP will be released on CD and vinyl (including picture disc) on 4 December 2026 by Sony Music. The EP contains four previously unreleased live performances mixed and mastered by British producer Chris Porter.

=== Track listing ===
All tracks are written by George Michael, except where noted.

No.	Title	Writer(s)	Length
1.	"Wake Me Up Before You Go-Go" (live in Beijing)
2.	"Everything She Wants" (live in Guangzhou)
3.	"Freedom" (live in Beijing)
4.	"Careless Whisper" (live in Guangzhou)	Michael; Andrew Ridgeley

== See also ==
- Wham! in China: Foreign Skies
- Wham! (2023 film)
- George Michael: A Different Story
- George Michael: The Faith Tour
