= The Big Tour =

1984–85 concert tour by Wham!

- World tour by Wham!
- UK tour programme cover
- Location: Europe; North America; Asia; Oceania
- Associated album: Make It Big
- Start date: 4 December 1984
- End date: 10 April 1985
- Legs: 3
- No. of shows: 15 in United Kingdom; 7 in Japan; 6 in United States; 5 in Australia; 2 in China; 2 in Hong Kong; 2 in Republic of Ireland; 39 in total
- Supporting act: Gary Crowley

Wham! concert chronology
- Club Fantastic Tour (1983); The Big Tour (1984–85); Whamamerica! (1985)

The Big Tour was the second concert tour by English pop duo Wham!, launched in support of their multi-platinum second studio album Make It Big, which sold over six million units in the US alone. The tour spanned 4 months between December 1984 and April 1985, comprising 39 shows across the UK, Ireland, Japan, Australia, United States, Hong Kong and China. Wham! made history in China and achieved worldwide publicity by being the first Western pop act to visit the country.

== Overview ==
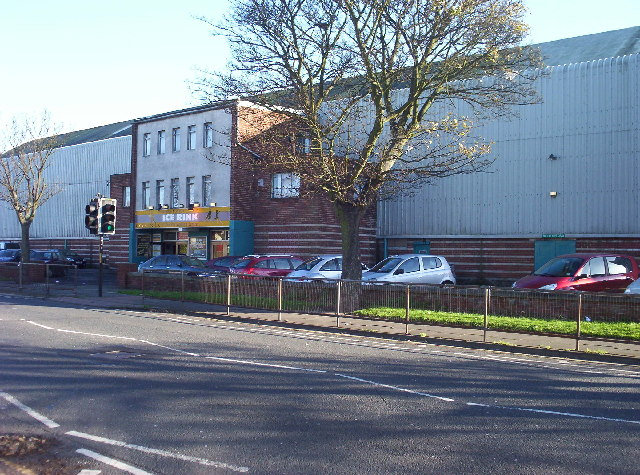
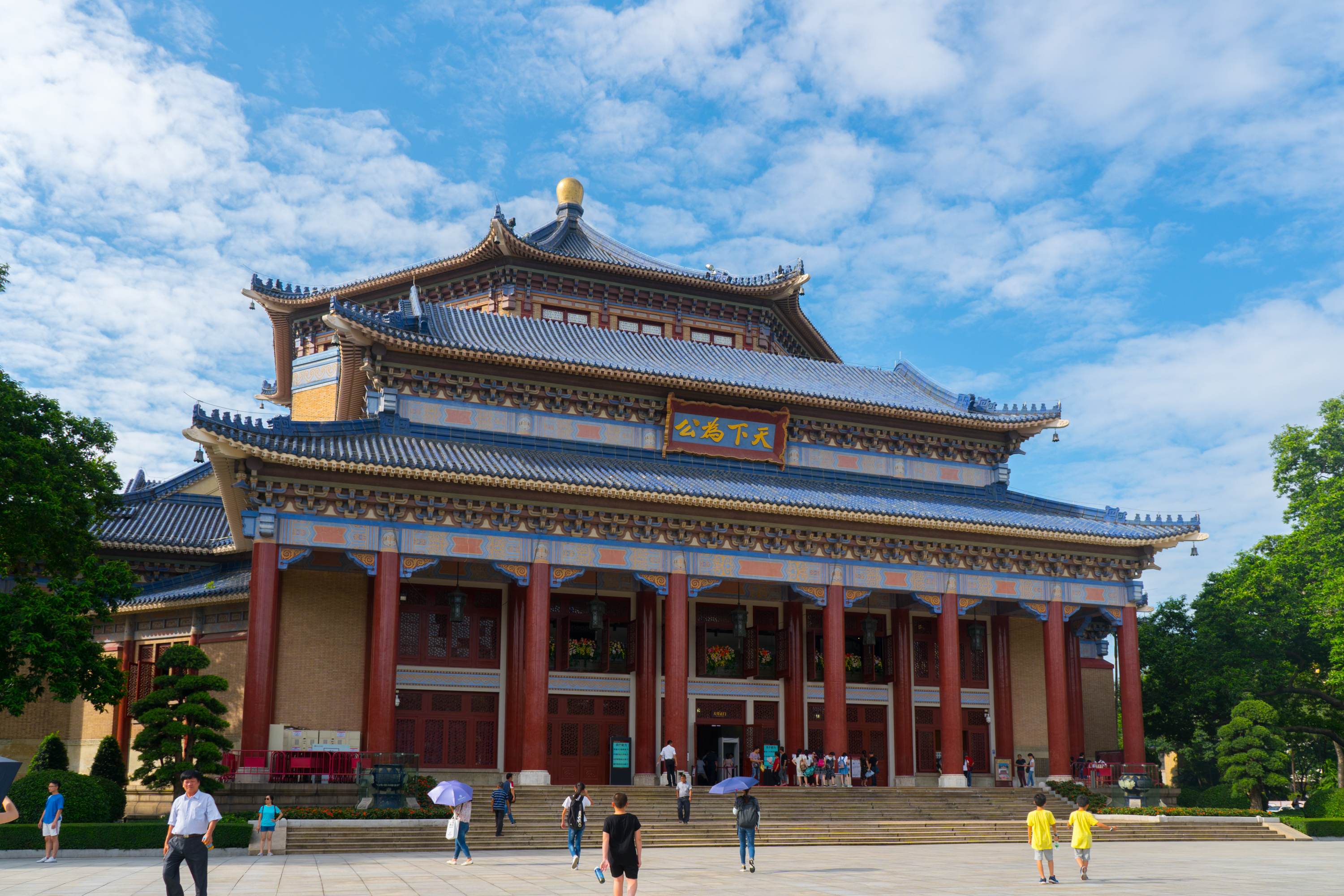
The tour began at Whitley Bay Ice Rink (top) and ended at Canton's Sun Yat-sen Memorial Hall (bottom).

The Big Tour opened at Whitley Bay Ice Rink on 4 December with an audience of around 5,500. The venue was small due to no other venues being available in the north east, they were booked for two more shows between concerts in Glasgow, Dublin and Leeds. Just as the UK portion of the tour was in its stride, George Michael hurt his back during a performance and the band had to cancel five consecutive shows which were put back until February and March. They continued the UK leg with shows in Wembley Arena during the Christmas period to around 50,000 fans during which "Last Christmas" reached number two on the UK Singles Chart.

The new year began the tour in Japan performing in the Fukuoka Sunpalace with other dates in Osaka, Nagoya, Tokyo and Yokohama. In Australia, five shows followed in Melbourne and Sydney before continuing in the United States, with a sellout concert at the Palladium in front of 4,400 in February 1985. Wham! returned to the United Kingdom with earlier dates having been rescheduled.

Following a month break, the tour resumed in Hong Kong on 2 April 1985. The 10-day visit to China was the first by a Western pop group. The excursion was a publicity scheme devised by Simon Napier-Bell (one of their two managers—Jazz Summers being the other). It began with a concert at the Peoples' Gymnasium in Beijing (then Peking) in front of 13,000 people. They also played a concert in front of 5,000 in Canton. The two concerts were played without compensation. Wham!'s visit to China attracted huge media attention across the world. Napier-Bell later admitted that he sabotaged the efforts of British rock band Queen to be the first to play in China. He made two brochures for the Chinese authorities – one featuring Wham! fans as pleasant middle-class youngsters, and one portraying Queen lead singer Freddie Mercury in typically flamboyant poses. The Chinese opted for Wham!.

"The first feeling was of failure, there was no way we could communicate. And when we actually found out what had gone on [with people being told not to dance] I was just furious. Obviously, I felt responsibility at the time to represent my generation from the west in a good light and pop music in a good light."

— George Michael reflecting on the China visit in 1986

== Recordings ==
A documentary film was shot over two weeks in April and edited over summer and autumn 1985 in London. The whole China visit was documented by British film director Lindsay Anderson and producer Martin Lewis in their film Wham! in China: Foreign Skies released in 1986. The first ever public viewing of Foreign Skies was shown on large video screens on Saturday 28 June 1986 at the farewell show "The Final".

== Support acts ==
- DJ Gary Crowley
- Pepsi & Shirlie
- DJ Neil Fincham

== Set list ==
Japan (Note: Taken from the official Japanese tour programme.)

1. "Wake Me Up Before You Go-Go"
2. "Club Tropicana"
3. "Blue"
4. "Heartbeat"
5. "Credit Card Baby"
6. "If You Were There"
7. "Like a Baby"
8. "Wham Rap! (Enjoy What You Do)"
9. "Freedom"
10. "Careless Whisper"
11. "Young Guns (Go for It)"
  Encore
12. "Wake Me Up Before You Go-Go"
13. "Last Christmas"

Beijing, China

1. "Bad Boys"
2. "Club Tropicana"
3. "Blue"
4. "Wake Me Up Before You Go-Go"
5. "A Ray of Sunshine"
6. "Young Guns (Go for It)"
7. "Careless Whisper"
8. "Everything She Wants"
9. "Like a Baby"
10. "If You Were There"
11. "Love Machine"

== Tour dates ==
List of concerts, showing date, city, country and venue
Date	City	Country	Venue
Europe
4 December 1984	Whitley Bay	England	Ice Rink
5 December 1984	Glasgow	Scotland	Apollo
6 December 1984	Glasgow	Scotland	Apollo
8 December 1984	Dublin	Ireland	R.D.S.
9 December 1984	Dublin	Ireland	R.D.S.
11 December 1984	Whitley Bay	England	Ice Rink
12 December 1984	Whitley Bay	England	Ice Rink
14 December 1984	Leeds	England	Queens Hall
~~15 December 1984~~	Edinburgh	Scotland	Ingliston
~~17 December 1984~~	Bournemouth	England	International Centre
~~18 December 1984~~	Bournemouth	England	International Centre
~~19 December 1984~~	Birmingham	England	N.E.C.
~~20 December 1984~~	Birmingham	England	N.E.C.
23 December 1984	London	England	Wembley Arena
24 December 1984	London	England	Wembley Arena
26 December 1984	London	England	Wembley Arena
27 December 1984	London	England	Wembley Arena
Asia
8 January 1985	Fukuoka	Japan	Fukuoka Sunpalace
10 January 1985	Osaka	Japan	Festival Hall
11 January 1985	Osaka	Japan	Gymnasium
13 January 1985	Nagoya	Japan	Civic Assembly Hall
16 January 1985	Tokyo	Japan	Budokan
17 January 1985	Yokohama	Japan	Gymnasium
18 January 1985	Tokyo	Japan	Budokan
Oceania
22 January 1985	Melbourne	Australia	Melbourne Sports and Entertainment Centre
23 January 1985	Melbourne	Australia	Melbourne Sports and Entertainment Centre
24 January 1985	Melbourne	Australia	Melbourne Sports and Entertainment Centre
26 January 1985	Sydney	Australia	Sydney Entertainment Centre
27 January 1985	Sydney	Australia	Sydney Entertainment Centre
North America
4 February 1985	Los Angeles	United States	Palladium
5 February 1985	Oakland	United States	Kaiser Convention Center
7 February 1985	Dallas	United States	Bronco Bowl
13 February 1985	Philadelphia	United States	Tower Theatre
14 February 1985	New York City	United States	Beacon Theatre
16 February 1985	Boston	United States	Orpheum Theatre
Europe
23 February 1985	Edinburgh	Scotland	Ingliston Royal Highland
26 February 1985	Birmingham	England	N.E.C.
27 February 1985	Birmingham	England	N.E.C.
1 March 1985	Bournemouth	England	Bournemouth International Centre
2 March 1985	Bournemouth	England	Bournemouth International Centre
Asia
2 April 1985	Hong Kong	British Dependent Territory	Coliseum
3 April 1985	Hong Kong	British Dependent Territory	Coliseum
7 April 1985	Beijing	China	Workers' Gymnasium
10 April 1985	Canton	China	Sun Yat-sen Memorial Hall

Key
~~Show~~	Denotes cancelled concert dates that were rescheduled.

=== Box office score data ===
Venue	City	Attendance	Gross
Palladium	Los Angeles	4,400 / sellout	$57,402
Henry J. Kaiser Convention Center	Oakland, California	7,182 / sellout	$97,032
Bronco Bowl	Dallas	/	$
The Tower	Philadelphia	2,971 / sellout	$36,565
Beacon Theatre	New York City	/	$
Orpheum Theatre	Boston	/	$
Total		/	$

== Personnel ==
As printed in the official tour programme.

- George Michael & Andrew Ridgeley
- Gary Crowley – Crowd DJ (Guest Star)
- Tommy Eyre – M.D. & Keyboards
- Trevor Murrell – Drums
- Deon Estus – Bass
- Hugh Burns – Guitars
- Mark Fisher – Keyboards
- Danny Cummings – Percussion
- Paul Spong – Trumpet
- Dave 'Baps' Baptiste – Saxophone
- Raul D'Oliviera – Trumpet
- Leroy Osbourne – Vocals
- Janey Hallett – Vocals
- Janet Mooney – Vocals
- Shirlie Holliman – Dancer
- Pepsi DeMacque – Dancer
- Simon Napier-Bell – Management
- Jazz Summers – Management
- Jake Duncan – Tour Manager
- Ken Watts – Production Manager
- Dave Davis – Guitars & Keyboards
- Richard "Dikka" Jones – Drums & Percussion
- Tony Blanc – Sound Engineer
- John Roden – Monitor Engineer
- John 'Judge' Loudon – Lighting Engineer
- Ross Balfour – Staging
- Russell Sparks – Staging
- Lesley Morrall – Wardrobe
- Yioda Panayiotou – Wardrobe
- Melanie Panayiotou – Make-up & Hairdressing
- Dave Moulder – Personal Security
- Ronnie Franklin – Personal Security
- Connie Filippello – Press & P.R.
- Mike Putland – Photographer
- Mr & Mrs. Panos
- Mrs. Jenny Ridgeley
- Mrs. Tommy Eyre
- Ms. Debbie Sweeny
