= Club Fantastic Tour =

1983 concert tour by Wham!

- Tour by Wham!
- Tour programme cover
- Location: United Kingdom
- Associated album: Fantastic
- Start date: 9 October 1983
- End date: 30 November 1983
- No. of shows: 29 (30 scheduled)
- Supporting act(s): Gary Crowley

Wham! concert chronology
- Club Fantastic Tour (1983); The Big Tour (1984–85)

The Club Fantastic Tour (also advertised as the Club Fantastic '83 Tour) was the debut concert tour by English pop duo Wham!, launched in support of their first studio album Fantastic (1983). It was sponsored by Fila sportswear and spanned two months from October to late November 1983, comprising 30 sold-out shows across England, Scotland and Wales.

== Background ==
Wham! announced a tour in August 1983. Their co-manager Simon Napier-Bell had a plan to raise some revenue; if little money was to be made from records, then it was time for the duo to begin performing with a 30-date tour of the UK. Napier-Bell secured a £50,000 sponsorship deal with the sportswear manufacturer Fila, with George Michael and Andrew Ridgeley wearing the company's clothing on stage throughout the tour.

Halfway through the tour, Michael lost his voice and had to cancel ten consecutive shows; concerts were pushed back and rescheduled.

== Concert synopsis ==
The show started with Michael entering the stage right-side in yellow Fila sports gear, and Ridgeley entering the stage left-side in red Fila sports gear while the band played "Bad Boys". Pepsi & Shirlie, backing singers and dancers, ran on stage for "Club Tropicana".

Ridgeley then announced the next song, "Blue", a slow love ballad. He held a plectrum in his mouth and shook hands. They then sang "Wham Rap! (Enjoy What You Do)", dancing as a foursome. They continued with "A Ray of Sunshine", which ended the first part of the set. During the break a screen appeared and the crowd were shown family photos such as Ridgeley in pyjamas, and a young Michael in glasses. A mixed compilation of the group's music videos was played.

Then Michael sang "Careless Whisper" to a backing track on his own. He and Ridgeley changed into white Wham! singlet T-shirts and sang "Bad Boys". "Love Machine" followed, then "Nothing Looks the Same in the Light". "Come On" ended the set, with the two playing a mock game of badminton, occasionally whacking a shuttlecock out to the crowd.

The encore was "Young Guns (Go for It)" with the duo wearing camp cowboy outfits, "Wham Rap!" with them wearing white, and finally Chic's 1979 disco hit "Good Times".

== Opening acts ==
The group decided to go back to their clubbing roots and had Gary Crowley (of Capital Radio) as the opening DJ act. Also included were some body-poppers called Eklypse who did dance routines for over an hour before the show.

== Set list ==
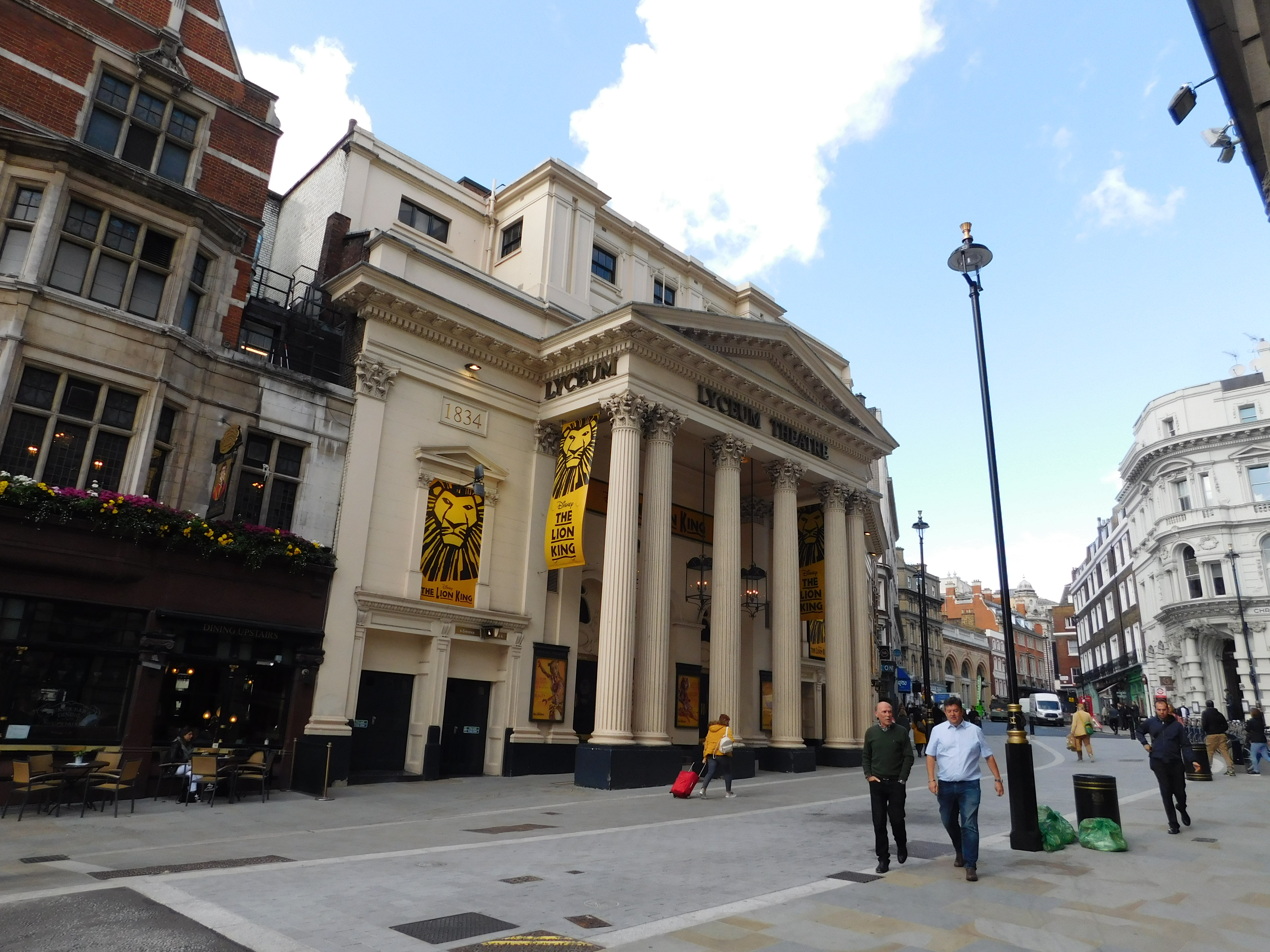
Lyceum Theatre, the venue of five consecutive shows in London

The first set saw the band play most of the hits from the Fantastic album before Michael was on stage alone singing songs like "Careless Whisper", a then-unreleased track.

The average set list was as follows:

1. "Young Guns (Go for It)"
2. "Club Tropicana"
3. "Blue"
4. "Wham Rap! (Enjoy What You Do)"
5. "A Ray of Sunshine"
  Break
6. "Careless Whisper"
7. "Bad Boys"
8. "Love Machine"
9. "Nothing Looks the Same in the Light"
10. "Come On"
11. "Young Guns (Go for It)"
12. "Wham Rap! (Enjoy What You Do)"
13. "Good Times"

== Tour dates ==
List of concerts, showing date, city, country and venue
Date	City	Country	Venue
United Kingdom
9 October 1983	Aberdeen	Scotland	Capitol Theatre
10 October 1983	Aberdeen	Scotland	Capitol Theatre
11 October 1983	Edinburgh	Scotland	Playhouse Theatre
13 October 1983	Glasgow	Scotland	Apollo Theatre
14 October 1983	Blackpool	England	Opera House
15 October 1983	Newcastle	England	City Hall
16 October 1983	Manchester	England	Apollo Theatre
18 October 1983	Liverpool	England	Royal Court Theatre
19 October 1983	Sheffield	England	City Hall
21 October 1983	Leicester	England	De Montfort Hall
22 October 1983	St Austell	England	Coliseum
23 October 1983	Bristol	England	Studio
24 October 1983	Swansea	Wales	Top Rank
27 October 1983	London	England	Hammersmith Odeon
28 October 1983	London	England	Hammersmith Odeon
~~29 October 1983~~	London	England	Hammersmith Odeon
~~30 October 1983~~	Brighton	England	Centre
~~1 November 1983~~	Nottingham	England	Royal Centre
~~2 November 1983~~	Poole	England	Arts Centre
~~3 November 1983~~	Crawley	England	Leisure Centre
~~4 November 1983~~	Leeds	England	University
~~6 November 1983~~	Birmingham	England	Odeon Theatre
~~7 November 1983~~	Birmingham	England	Odeon Theatre
~~8 November 1983~~	London	England	Lyceum
~~9 November 1983~~	London	England	Lyceum
~~10 November 1983~~	Brighton	England	Centre
13 November 1983	London	England	Lyceum
14 November 1983	London	England	Lyceum
15 November 1983	London	England	Lyceum
16 November 1983	London	England	Lyceum
17 November 1983	London	England	Lyceum
19 November 1983	Whitley Bay	England	Ice Rink
20 November 1983	Swansea	Wales	Top Rank
21 November 1983	Poole	England	Arts Centre
24 November 1983	Birmingham	England	Odeon Theatre
25 November 1983	Leeds	England	University
26 November 1983	London	England	Hammersmith Odeon
28 November 1983	Nottingham	England	Royal Centre
29 November 1983	Brighton	England	Centre
30 November 1983	Brighton	England	Centre

Key
~~Show~~	Denotes cancelled concert dates that were rescheduled.

== Personnel ==
- Andrew Ridgeley
- George Michael
- Shirlie Holliman
- Pepsi DeMacque

Musicians

- Tommy Eyre – keyboards
- Deon Estus – bass guitar
- Trevor Morrell – drums
- Robert Ahwai – guitar
- David "Babs" Baptiste – saxophone
- Paul Spong – trumpet
- Colin Graham – trumpet
- Janey Hallet – backing vocals
- Gee – backing vocals
- Jenny – backing vocals
- Danny Cummings – percussion
- Mike Brady – recorder
- Barry Mead – tour manager
- Ken – production manager
- Glenn – guitar tech
- Wendy – assistant tour manager
- Lesley Morrall – wardrobe
- Mel – hair & makeup
- Promoter – Harvey Goldsmith Entertainments
- Management – Simon Napier-Bell & Jazz Summers
- Personal security – Dave Moulder
- Concert Publishing Co. – programme & merchandising

Sponsor

- Fila – sportswear

== Quotes ==
Gary Crowley described the tour as "some of my bestest bestest memories ... The nearest I'll ever get to being in the Beatles' A Hard Day's Night."
