= List of number-one singles of 1984 (Ireland) =

This is a list of singles which have reached number one on the Irish Singles Chart in 1984.

Week ending	Song	Artist	Ref.
7 January	"Only You"	The Flying Pickets	
14 January	"Only You"	The Flying Pickets	
21 January	"Pipes of Peace"	Paul McCartney	
28 January	"Pipes of Peace"	Paul McCartney	
4 February	"A Rockin' Good Way"	Shakin' Stevens and Bonnie Tyler	
11 February	"Radio Ga Ga"	Queen	
18 February	"Girls Just Want to Have Fun"	Cyndi Lauper	
25 February	"Girls Just Want to Have Fun"	Cyndi Lauper	
3 March	"99 Red Balloons"	Nena	
10 March	"99 Red Balloons"	Nena	
17 March	"99 Red Balloons"	Nena	
24 March	"99 Red Balloons"	Nena	
31 March	"Hello"	Lionel Richie	
7 April	"Hello"	Lionel Richie	
14 April	"Hello"	Lionel Richie	
21 April	"Hello"	Lionel Richie	
28 April	"Against All Odds (Take a Look at Me Now)"	Phil Collins	
5 May	"Against All Odds (Take a Look at Me Now)"	Phil Collins	
12 May	"The Reflex"	Duran Duran	
19 May	"The Reflex"	Duran Duran	
26 May	"Automatic"	The Pointer Sisters	
2 June	"The Reflex"	Duran Duran	
9 June	"Wake Me Up Before You Go-Go"	Wham!	
16 June	"Wake Me Up Before You Go-Go"	Wham!	
23 June	"Two Tribes"	Frankie Goes to Hollywood	
30 June	"Two Tribes"	Frankie Goes to Hollywood	
7 July	"Two Tribes"	Frankie Goes to Hollywood	
14 July	"Two Tribes"	Frankie Goes to Hollywood	
21 July	"Two Tribes"	Frankie Goes to Hollywood	
28 July	"Hole in My Shoe"	Neil	
4 August	"Two Tribes"	Frankie Goes To Hollywood	
11 August	"Two Tribes"	Frankie Goes To Hollywood	
18 August	"Careless Whisper"	George Michael	
25 August	"Careless Whisper"	George Michael	
1 September	"Careless Whisper"	George Michael	
8 September	"I Just Called to Say I Love You"	Stevie Wonder	
15 September	"I Just Called to Say I Love You"	Stevie Wonder	
22 September	"I Just Called to Say I Love You"	Stevie Wonder	
29 September	"I Just Called to Say I Love You"	Stevie Wonder	
6 October	"I Just Called to Say I Love You"	Stevie Wonder	
13 October	"The War Song"	Culture Club	
20 October	"The War Song"	Culture Club	
27 October	"Freedom"	Wham!	
3 November	"Freedom"	Wham!	
10 November	"Freedom"	Wham!	
17 November	"I Feel for You"	Chaka Khan	
24 November	"I Feel for You"	Chaka Khan	
1 December	"I Should Have Known Better"	Jim Diamond	
8 December	"I Should Have Known Better"	Jim Diamond	
15 December	"I Should Have Known Better"	Jim Diamond	
22 December (Note: Two records were listed as number one this week the other being "Last Christmas")	"I Should Have Known Better"	Jim Diamond	
29 December	"Do They Know It's Christmas?"	Band Aid	

- 19 Number Ones
- Most weeks at No.1 (song): "Two Tribes" – Frankie Goes To Hollywood (7)
- Most weeks at No.1 (artist): Frankie Goes To Hollywood (7)
- Most No.1s: Wham! (2)

== See also ==
- 1984 in music
- Irish Singles Chart
- List of artists who reached number one in Ireland
