= Club Fantastic Megamix =

Single by Wham!
- B-side: "A Ray of Sunshine" (instrumental remix)
- Released: 25 November 1983
- Recorded: 1983
- Studio: Maison Rouge (London)
- Genre: Pop
- Length: 3:54 (7″ version); 8:35 (12″ version)
- Label: CBS; Innervision
- Songwriter: George Michael
- Producers: Steve Brown; George Michael

Wham! singles chronology
"Club Tropicana" (1983)	"Club Fantastic Megamix" (1983)	"Wake Me Up Before You Go-Go" (1984)

"Club Fantastic Megamix" is a medley single released by Wham! on 25 November 1983, and was the last single release for the duo on Innervision Records. It was mixed by DMC's Alan Couthard and approved by Mark Dean, the manager of Innervision Records. The single was released three months after Wham! had begun proceedings to leave the label, and was disapproved of by George Michael and Andrew Ridgeley. The single, which consisted of a mix of the tracks "A Ray of Sunshine", "Love Machine" and "Come On" from the album Fantastic (1983), reached number 15 on the UK Singles Chart.

The only reason why the "Club Fantastic Megamix" was able to be issued was because the songs had already been released. Prior to a song being released, a publisher has the right to grant the first license of a tune of which he holds the copyright. Because those three songs had already been released to the public, the songwriter was unable to prevent the record company from creating this second release.

== Track listing ==
7″: Innervision / A 3586 (UK)
No.	Title	Writer(s)	Length
1.	"Club Fantastic Megamix"	George Michael; Warren "Pete" Moore; Billy Griffin	3:54
2.	"A Ray of Sunshine" (instrumental mix)	Michael	4:03

12″: Innervision / TA 3586 (UK)
No.	Title	Writer(s)	Length
1.	"Club Fantastic Megamix" (12" version)	Michael; Moore; Griffin	8:35
2.	"A Ray of Sunshine" (instrumental remix)	Michael	5:39

== Charts ==
Chart (1983)	Peak position
Germany (GfK)	56
Ireland (IRMA)	16
Netherlands (Single Top 100)	44
UK Singles (Official Charts)	15
