= Son of Albert =

1990 studio album by Andrew Ridgeley

Studio album by Andrew Ridgeley
- Released: 7 May 1990 (Australia)
- Recorded: 1989–1990
- Genre: Rock
- Length: 46:22
- Labels: Columbia; CK-46188
- Producers: Andrew Ridgeley; Gary Bromham; Martyn "Max" Heyes

Singles from Son of Albert
- 1. "Shake" Released: 19 March 1990; 2. "Red Dress" Released: 1990

Son of Albert is the only studio album by the English musician Andrew Ridgeley, previously one half of the musical duo Wham! Originally released in May 1990, Ridgeley's effort was a sharp turn away from his former pop image with Wham! years earlier, focusing more on guitars and drums. The critical reaction to the album was mixed, and sales were disappointing. As a result, Ridgeley gradually quit playing music professionally.

Two singles from the album, "Red Dress" and "Shake", were released in 1990 with little success (with the exception of a top 20 hit in Australia for the latter). Another song, "Mexico", was scheduled to be released as the album's third single but was dropped.

The album title is a reference to Ridgeley's father, Albert.

In January 2018, a remastered and expanded edition was released by Cherry Red Records.

== Reception ==
Professional ratings
Review scores
Source	Rating
AllMusic	2/5 stars
Entertainment Weekly	C+
New Musical Express	1/10

Entertainment Weekly praised the instrumental "verve" of the songs, but criticized them for lacking conviction: "Ridgeley seems to have redefined himself as a kick-in-the-pants rock & roller, but his songs still come out sounding like manufactured pop."

== Track listing ==
All songs are arranged and produced by Andrew Ridgeley and Gary Bromham, except where noted.

No.	Title	Writer(s)	Length
1.	"Red Dress"	Gary Bromham; Ridgeley	4:09
2.	"Shake"	David Austin; Ridgeley	3:29
3.	"The Price of Love" (The Everly Brothers cover)	Don Everly; Phil Everly	4:08
4.	"Flame"	Austin; Ridgeley	4:58
5.	"Hangin'" (Chic cover)	Bernard Edwards; Nile Rodgers	3:21
6.	"Mexico"	Bromham; Danny Cummings; Ridgeley	5:46
7.	"Big Machine"	Bromham; Ridgeley	4:24
8.	"Kiss Me"	Hugh Burns; Ridgeley	4:30
9.	"Baby Jane"	Michael Cozzi; Ridgeley	5:09
10.	"Shake (Hardcore)"	Austin; Ridgeley	6:03
Total length:			46:29

2018 Expanded Edition bonus tracks
No.	Title	Writer(s)	Length
11.	"Red Dress" (12" mix)	Bromham; Ridgeley	6:40
12.	"Shake" (A cappella version)	Austin; Ridgeley	3:13
13.	"Hangin'" (Alternative extended)	Edwards; Rodgers	6:03
14.	"Shake" (Extended version)	Austin; Ridgeley	4:55
15.	"Hangin'" (Extended version)	Edwards; Rodgers	6:16
16.	"Red Dress" (Extended version)	Bromham; Ridgeley	5:10

== Personnel ==
=== Musicians ===
- Andrew Ridgeley – lead vocals, additional vocals, Spanish vocals on "Mexico", voice box
- Mary Cassidy, Lauren Fownes, Brie Howard, Miss Johnny, George Michael (on "Red Dress"), Tessa Niles – additional vocals
- Gary Bromham, Dan McCafferty, Mark "Bobby" Robinson – Spanish vocals on "Mexico"
- Robert Ahwai, Gary Bromham, Phil Palmer – guitars
- Tony Barnard, Michael Cozzi – acoustic and electric guitars
- Hugh Burns – Spanish guitar on "Mexico", acoustic and electric guitars
- Gary Masters – keyboards
- Mark Feltham – harmonica
- Graham Edwards, Deon Estus, Davey Faragher, Jerry Ferguson, Paul Gray – bass
- Danny Thompson – Spanish vocals on "Mexico", electric bass, double bass
- Gary Bromham, Pat Torpey, Paul Ridgeley – drums
- Laurence Cottell, Dave O'Higgins, Paul Spong – horns
- Danny Cummings – percussion
- Richard Gibbs – voice box

=== Production ===
- Engineered by Harvey Birrell, Jacques Erhardt, Gordon Fordyce, Paul Gomersall, Martyn "Max" Heyes, Russell Leahy, Gary Wilkinson, and Perry Cleveland-Peck
- Mixed at Amazon Studios, Liverpool; Comforts Place, Lingfield; Mayfair Studios, London, and Olympic Studios, London
- Mixed by Paul Gomersall, Martyn "Max" Heyes, and Tim Weidener
- Photography by Julian Broad
- Album design by Andrew Ridgeley and Simon Halfon
- Management: Lippman Kahane Entertainment
- Recorded at Comforts Place, Lingfield; Compass Point, Nassau; Eden Studios, London, England; EMI/Pathé Studios, Paris, France; Galaxy Sound Studio, Los Angeles; Ground Control, Los Angeles; Great Linford Studios, Great Linford; Maison Rouge, London; Mayfair Studios, London; Olympic Studios, London; Terminal 24, London, and Skylight Studios, London

== Chart performance ==
=== Album ===
Chart performance for Son of Albert
Chart (1990)	Peak position
Australian Albums (ARIA)	63
Dutch Albums (MegaCharts)	66
US Billboard 200	130

=== "Shake" single ===
Chart performance for "Shake"
Chart (1990)	Peak position
Australia (ARIA)	16
Netherlands (Single Top 100)	48
UK Singles Chart	58
US Billboard Hot 100	77
