= George Michael: Portrait of an Artist =

- Directed by: Simon Napier-Bell
- Starring: George Michael
- Distributed by: Kaleidoscope Film Distribution
- Release date: 25 June 2023
- Running time: 94 minutes
- Country: United Kingdom
- Language: English

George Michael: Portrait of an Artist is a 2023 documentary about English singer-songwriter George Michael. It was directed by Simon Napier-Bell, who managed Wham! from 1983 to 1985.

== Critical reception ==
ABC wrote the documentary "dives deeper into who George really was—a kind and generous person who ultimately fought many demons while being front and center as one of the most famous musicians of his time—through never before heard anecdotal stories of his closest friends and allies."
