= George Michael: A Different Story =

2004 British documentary film

- Theatrical release poster
- Directed by: Southan Morris
- Produced by: Caroline True
- Starring: George Michael; Andrew Ridgeley; Sting; Mariah Carey; Elton John; Noel Gallagher; Simon Cowell; Geri Halliwell; Boy George; Kenny Goss; Pepsi & Shirlie
- Cinematography: John Sorapure
- Edited by: Duncan Shepherd
- Music by: George Michael
- Production company: Aegean Films
- Distributed by: Gorilla Entertainment
- Release dates: 27 November 2004 (BBC One); 9 December 2005 (United Kingdom)
- Running time: 99 minutes
- Country: United Kingdom
- Language: English

George Michael: A Different Story is a 2004 British documentary film about the English singer, songwriter and record producer George Michael. Directed by Southan Morris, it follows Michael's life from joining Wham! in 1981, to the present-day covering his career as a solo artist including personal and professional gain and loss. The film is produced by Aegean Films with Gorilla Entertainment serving as distributor.

A Different Story made its UK television debut in 2004 on BBC One with a shortened, edited runtime. The film had its European premiere as part of the 2005 Berlin Film Festival on 16 February 2005. The film had a limited theatrical release in the United Kingdom on 9 December 2005.

== Synopsis ==
The idea of a documentary evolved because of his former bandmate Andrew Ridgeley being prepared to speak on camera and his father also agreeing to be interviewed. A Different Story begins with Michael on a promotional tour in Milan, Italy for the album Patience released earlier in the year, showing brief clips of Michael in a radio interview with fans outside chanting his name.

Filmed over a year, the film chronicles the most up to date events of Michael's life, beginning with his childhood in Hertfordshire, England, reflecting on his time as part of Wham!, and the first on-screen interview together with Ridgeley since the split.

"One way or another, I realised there was the potential here to make a really in-depth documentary about the timeline of my career."

— George Michael

Michael discusses his success as a solo artist beginning in 1987 and the big impact of the successful album Faith which earned Michael a Grammy for Album of the Year in 1989 and the battles he had with the public and personal life including his sexuality. During the promotion of the album Michael states that he had been striving to have the same level of success as Michael Jackson and Madonna. However, during the interview he admits that as the Faith Tour ended and it started to fade, "I felt like I was going insane".

It also touches briefly on the court case with Sony Music and the music business.

Other people interviewed for the film include his father Jack Panayiotou, David Austin, Mariah Carey, Geri Halliwell, Elton John, Sting, Noel Gallagher, Simon Cowell and Boy George.

== Release ==
An edited 60 minute version of A Different Story was first broadcast on British television channel BBC One on 27 November 2004. It was then aired on BBC Three uncut with extra footage on 19 December 2004.

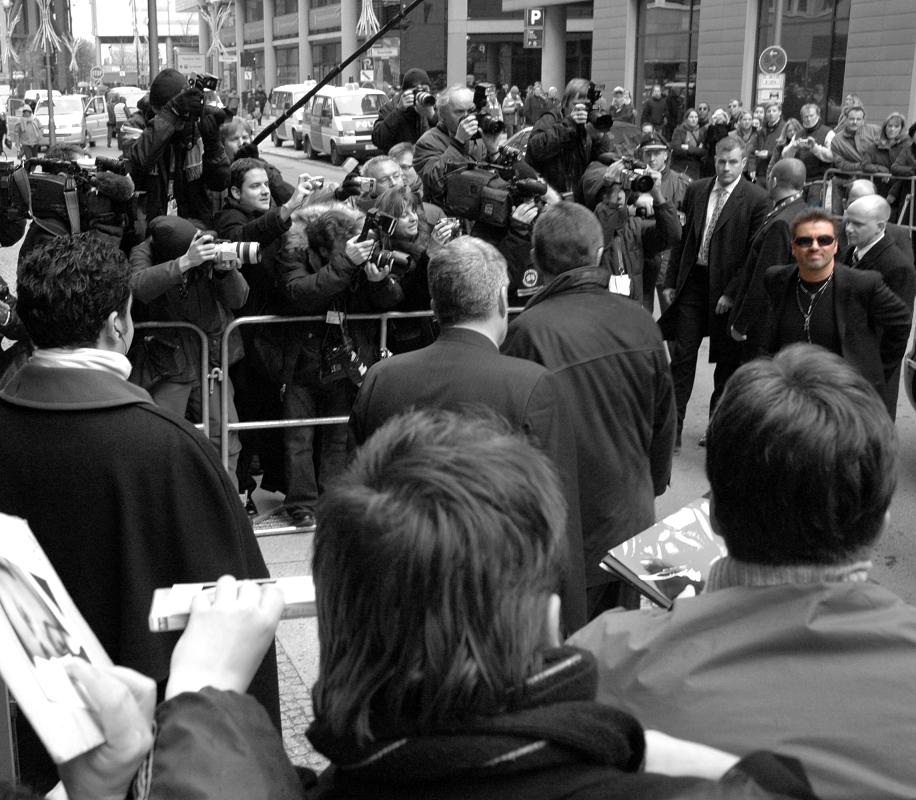
George Michael arriving at Berlin's Film Festival in 2005.

Following the broadcast, the extended version of the documentary was screened at the 55th Berlin International Film Festival on the 16 February 2005. During promotion for the film Michael attended a photo op and press conference hosted by Robert Fischer at the Berlin Film Festival with director Southan Morris, producer Caroline True and executive producer and manager Andy Stephens. The North American screening took place at Manhattan's Tribeca Film Festival between the 25 April and the 7 May 2005. The film was also part of the official selection at film festivals in Brazil and Denmark. The film was released in Japan on 23 December 2005.

On 5 December 2005 Michael attended the UK screening for the film, held at London's Curzon Mayfair Cinema. A Different Story was given a limited theatrical release in the United Kimgdom on 9 December 2005 by Gorilla Entertainment.

=== Home media ===
In September 2023 the film was released on digital by Sony Music on various streaming and video on demand platforms.

== Reception ==
=== Critical response ===
Eddie Cockrell of Variety wrote: "A candid, self-deprecating and altogether winning career-to-date overview, George Michael: A Different Story finds the witty and articulate pop star looking back with unblinking candor and wry humor." Caroline Westbrook writing for Empire gave the film 3/5 stars, saying, "Michael himself comes across as a thoroughly decent bloke who's not afraid to talk candidly about coming to terms with his sexuality, the death of his mother and that headline-grabbing toilet incident."

The Sydney Morning Herald wrote "the feature film lays out Michael's life with no punches spared", and that "for Michael, the documentary—being screened at the Berlin festival—is a chance to put the record straight." Mary Nyiri, writing for Kino Critics, said, "even if you are not a fan of George Michael as a pop songwriter and lead singer, his story is entertaining and his bluntness refreshing", giving the film a 3/5 rating.

== See also ==
- George Michael: The Faith Tour
- Wham! 10 Days in China
- Wham! (2023 film)
