= Club Tropicana =

- Original UK 7-inch vinyl picture sleeve

Single by Wham!

from the album Fantastic
- B-side: "Blue"
- Written: 1981
- Released: 22 July 1983
- Studio: Maison Rouge (London)
- Genre: Post-disco
- Length: 4:29; 3:31 (instrumental)
- Label: CBS
- Songwriters: George Michael; Andrew Ridgeley
- Producers: Steve Brown; George Michael

Wham! singles chronology
"Bad Boys" (1983)	"Club Tropicana" (1983)	"Club Fantastic Megamix" (1983)

Music video
- "Club Tropicana" on YouTube "Blue (Armed with Love)" on YouTube

"Club Tropicana" is a single by English pop duo Wham!, released by Innervision Records on 22 July 1983. It was written by members George Michael and Andrew Ridgeley.

== Background ==
"Club Tropicana" was written in 1981 in Ridgeley's living room, before the band or bandname had been fully established, and was the second Wham! song they came up with after the initial "Wham Rap!". The initial song inspiration came from their excitement over the glamour and escapism of the then burgeoning New Romantic club scene, and Michael, Ridgeley and Shirlie Holliman's occasional visits to one such club in London, Le Beat Route. The song's lyrical theme was then expanded to also include the hedonism of summery Club 18-30 holidays, whilst musically fusing a Latin jazz rhythm with a groove inspired by the Gap Band's "Burn Rubber on Me".

The song was a mild departure from Wham!'s previous singles, which had all been motivated by social or political issues. "Club Tropicana", however, was an homage to the infamous Pikes Hotel, Ibiza, frequented by Freddie Mercury and the Wham! boys themselves. Club scenes in the video were shot at Pikes.

== Chart performance ==
"Club Tropicana" was released in July 1983 and peaked at No. 4 in the UK, going on to become the 39th best selling single of 1983. It was the fourth and final single to be taken from the album Fantastic. Wham! then achieved four UK No. 1 singles before splitting at their height in 1986.

== Other releases ==
"Club Tropicana" was also included on the compilation album The Final and on Michael's greatest hits album Twenty Five.

== B-side ==
The B-side, "Blue", is a semi-instrumental dub track, which was cut once the Fantastic album was finished–Michael was involved as sole producer. Michael and Ridgeley spent the 11 hours they had available putting the track together, but it wasn't fully finished and ended up being released in its incomplete state as a B-side. During their Club Fantastic and Big tours, Wham! performed a more developed version of the song, complete with sung verses. This version was released as "Blue (Live in China)" on their 1986 LP Music from the Edge of Heaven as well as the B-side of 1985's single release of "Last Christmas". "Blue" was first available on CD on volume 12 of the So80s compilation series in 2019 and on streaming services in 2023 with the edition of The Singles: Echoes from the Edge of Heaven, the duo's last compilation album released.

== Music video ==
The music video for "Club Tropicana" was directed by Duncan Gibbins and shot at Pikes Hotel in Ibiza, owned by Tony Pike. It features scenes of Michael and Ridgeley on the beach, making eyes at bikini-clad girls played by their backing singers Dee C. Lee and Shirlie Holliman. They are also seen relaxing by a pool and sipping cocktails, with Michael lounging on a lilo in a white Speedo, along with the famous scene of trumpet-playing taking place in the pool itself. A twist in the sexual tension between the two men and two women is revealed at the end, when it turns out that Michael and Ridgeley are airline pilots and Lee and Holliman are stewardesses.

It was during this trip to Ibiza that Michael had his first physical homosexual encounter, confirming to himself that he was definitely either homosexual or bisexual. He confided first in Shirlie Holliman and then in Ridgeley, who both were OK with it.

As of February 2025, the music video has received more than 36.4 million views on YouTube. It was used as an homage for Lewis Capaldi's music video for "Forget Me" in 2022.

== Track listings ==
7″: Innervision / A 3613 (UK)
No.	Title	Writer(s)	Length
1.	"Club Tropicana"	George Michael; Andrew Ridgeley	4:29
2.	"Blue"	Michael	3:54

12″: Innervision / TA 3613 (UK)
No.	Title	Writer(s)	Length
1.	"Club Tropicana"	Michael; Ridgeley	4:29
2.	"Blue"	Michael	3:54
3.	"Club Tropicana" (instrumental)	Michael; Ridgeley	3:31

== Personnel ==
Credits adapted from Fantastic album liner notes.

- George Michael – vocals
- Trevor Murrell – drums
- Deon Estus – bass
- Andrew Ridgeley – guitars
- Andy Duncan – percussion
- Tommy Eyre – keyboards
- Ian Ritchie – horns
- Roddy Lorimer – horns

== Charts ==
=== Weekly charts ===
Weekly chart performance for "Club Tropicana"
Chart (1983)	Peak position
Australia (Kent Music Report)	60
Belgium (Ultratop 50 Flanders)	23
Finland (Suomen virallinen lista)	24
Ireland (IRMA)	4
Netherlands (Dutch Top 40)	8
Netherlands (Single Top 100)	14
New Zealand (Recorded Music NZ)	25
Norway (VG-lista)	10
UK Singles (Official Charts)	4
West Germany (GfK)	13

2025–2026 weekly chart performance for "Club Tropicana"
Chart (2025–2026)	Peak position
Japan Hot Overseas (Billboard Japan)	16
Netherlands Airplay (Dutch Charts)	43

=== Year-end charts ===
Year-end chart performance for "Club Tropicana"
Chart (1983)	Position
Netherlands (Dutch Top 40)	96

== Certifications and sales ==
Certifications for "Club Tropicana"
Region	Certification	Certified units/sales
Denmark (IFPI Danmark)	Gold	45,000^{‡}
Japan (RIAJ) physical 1997 release	Gold	50,000^{^}
New Zealand (RMNZ)	Gold	15,000^{‡}
United Kingdom (BPI)	Platinum	600,000^{‡}
^{^} Shipments figures based on certification alone.^{‡} Sales+streaming figures based on certification alone.
