= Bad Boys (Wham! song) =

- Original UK 7-inch vinyl release

Single by Wham!

from the album Fantastic
- B-side: "Bad Boys" (instrumental)
- Released: 6 May 1983
- Studio: Maison Rouge (London)
- Genre: Synth-pop; teen pop
- Length: 3:20 (single version); 4:58 (12″ mix); 3:25 (instrumental)
- Label: CBS
- Songwriter: George Michael
- Producers: Steve Brown; George Michael

Wham! singles chronology
"Wham Rap! (Enjoy What You Do)" (special U.S. re-mix) (1983)	"Bad Boys" (1983)	"Club Tropicana" (1983)

Music video
- "Bad Boys" on YouTube

"Bad Boys" is a song by English pop duo Wham!, released on 6 May 1983 as the third single from their debut studio album, Fantastic. It was written and co-produced by George Michael, one half of the duo, and released on Innervision Records.

The song is sung from the perspective of a rebellious teenager whose parents are concerned about his late-night activities. Michael, who was only 19 when he composed it (and the character refers to being that age in the song), also penned a middle eight in which the "parents" (Michael putting on more "adult" voices) air their concerns, which include late nights and cigarettes and ultimately asking, "Why do you have to be so cruel?" Michael's father was played by Anthony Souter in the music video, who was 18 and made up to look older. English model Gail Lawson also appears in the video, playing the blonde girl Michael and Andrew Ridgeley are with in a convertible car.

== Critical reception ==
Professional ratings
Review scores
Source	Rating
Smash Hits	not rated

Upon release, Cash Box wrote favorably of the song, saying its "snappy, full sounding arrangement defuses an ominous set of lyrics [...] transforming it into a quirky, upbeat outing."

In 2021, "Bad Boys" was included on The Guardian's list of George Michael's 30 greatest songs. Ranking the song 19th, reviewer Alexis Petridis described it as a "wilfully preposterous, extraordinarily camp" song with "its tongue cemented to its cheek that got taken in deadly earnest."

== Chart performance ==
"Bad Boys" was the third single to be taken from Wham!'s debut album, Fantastic, and reached number 2 in the UK Singles Chart, behind "Every Breath You Take" by the Police, going on to become the 26th best selling single of 1983. At the time, Wham! was projecting a hard, politically motivated image, with "Bad Boys" one of a number of songs projecting a stance of mood and youthful independence, a "soul boy – dole boy" theme. The single was also released in the United States, peaking at number 60. It was the duo's first time on the Billboard Hot 100 in the US, although they were listed as Wham!-UK.

"Bad Boys" became the biggest hit from the debut album, although it would be usurped by "Wake Me Up Before You Go-Go" from the album Make It Big in 1984, which became the first of four UK number-one singles the duo would enjoy. Michael quickly denounced "Bad Boys" as a song he hated, stating it was "like an albatross round my neck". The song was famously omitted from the 1997 compilation album The Best of Wham!: If You Were There..., despite the album including tracks that were not released as singles.

== Track listing ==
All tracks are written by George Michael.

7″: Innervision / A 3143 (UK)
No.	Title	Length
1.	"Bad Boys"	3:20
2.	"Bad Boys" (instrumental)	3:25

12″: Innervision / TA 3143 (UK)
No.	Title	Length
1.	"Bad Boys" (12″ mix)	4:58
2.	"Bad Boys" (instrumental)	3:25

== Personnel ==
Credits adapted from Fantastic album liner notes.

- George Michael – lead vocals, backing vocals
- Trevor Murrell – drums
- Deon Estus – bass, backing vocals
- Robert Ahwai – guitars
- Andrew Ridgeley – guitars
- Anne Dudley – keyboards
- Jess Bailey – keyboards
- Luís Jardim – percussion
- Paul Cox – horns
- Martin Drover – horns
- Jeff Daly (credited as Geoff Daley) – horns
- Ruby Mason – backing vocals
- Dee C. Lee – backing vocals

== Charts ==
=== Weekly charts ===
Weekly chart performance for "Bad Boys"
Chart (1983)	Peak position
Australia (Kent Music Report)	9
Belgium (Ultratop 50 Flanders)	8
Finland (Suomen virallinen singlelista)	5
Germany (GfK)	12
Netherlands (Single Top 100)	26
New Zealand (Recorded Music NZ)	10
Norway (VG-lista)	8
Paraguay (La Opinion)	1
Sweden (Sverigetopplistan)	11
Switzerland (Schweizer Hitparade)	6
UK Singles (Official Charts)	2
US Billboard Hot 100	60
US Cash Box Top 100	50

=== Year-end charts ===
Year-end chart performance for "Bad Boys"
Chart (1983)	Position
Australia (Kent Music Report)	86

== Certifications ==
Certifications for "Bad Boys"
Region	Certification	Certified units/sales
United Kingdom (BPI)	Silver	464,096
