= Careless Whisper =

1984 single by George Michael

- UK 7-inch vinyl picture sleeve (also used for various international releases)

Single by George Michael and Wham!

from the album Make It Big
- B-side: "Careless Whisper" (instrumental)
- Written: 1981
- Released: 23 July 1984
- Recorded: 1984
- Studio: Sarm West, London; Advision, London
- Genre: Pop; soul; R&B; quiet storm; sophisti-pop
- Length: 6:30 (12-inch and album version); 5:04 (7-inch and video version); 4:50 (radio edit)
- Label: Epic; Columbia; Sony
- Songwriters: George Michael; Andrew Ridgeley
- Producer: George Michael

George Michael singles chronology
"Careless Whisper" (1984)	"A Different Corner" (1986)

Wham! singles chronology
"Wake Me Up Before You Go-Go" (1984)	"Careless Whisper" (1984)	"Freedom" (1984)

Music video
- "Careless Whisper" on YouTube

Music video
- "Careless Whisper (Extended Mix)" on YouTube

"Careless Whisper" is a song by English singer-songwriter George Michael, then part of the duo Wham!, and released as the second single from Wham!'s second album, Make It Big (1984). It was produced by Michael and written by him and his Wham! bandmate Andrew Ridgeley. The single was credited to Michael as part of his transition to a solo career.

"Careless Whisper" is a contemporary pop song with R&B and soul influences. It features a saxophone part composed by Michael and played by Steve Gregory. Michael composed it as a teenager and recorded several versions, auditioning several saxophone players, before he was satisfied.

"Careless Whisper" topped the charts in the UK, the US, Australia, and several other countries. It is one of the best-selling songs in history, selling more than eleven million copies, including seven million in the US.

== Background ==
"Careless Whisper"
The composition features a distinctive tenor sax solo performed by Steve Gregory.

Michael wrote "Careless Whisper" on a bus at the age of 17, while he was travelling to his job as a DJ at a restaurant near Bushey, Hertfordshire. He worked on the song "in his head" for three months. Michael wrote in his autobiography, Bare, that he based the lyrics on events from his childhood. He said the lyrics were inspired by his experience of infidelity, imagining a situation in which his partner discovered him. He wrote, "'Careless Whisper' was us dancing, because we danced a lot, and the idea was – we are dancing... but she knows... and it's finished."

Andrew Ridgeley, Michael's bandmate in the pop group Wham!, wrote the chord sequence on the Fender Telecaster he received for his 18th birthday, with Michael singing the saxophone line. The pair worked on the song at Michael's family home in Radlett, and the basement flat in Peckham, London, where Ridgeley was living.

Michael and Ridgeley recorded the first demo on a Portastudio with a local producer, Paul Mex, in Ridgeley's family home on 18 January 1982, for a fee of £20. It featured a Doctor Rhythm drum machine, an acoustic guitar played by Ridgeley, and a bass guitar played by Dave West. Michael's vocal was recorded with a microphone attached to a broom handle. They recorded it quickly in a single take, as they had spent most of the session recording a demo for their song "Wham Rap! (Enjoy What You Do)".

On 24 March 1982, Michael recorded a more complete demo, including a backing band, at Halligan Band Centre, Holloway, London. According to the Wham! manager, Simon Napier-Bell, the saxophone part was recorded by a hobbyist friend of Michael's who lived nearby. Michael wrote that hearing "Careless Whisper" recorded with a band was "one of the most incredible moments of my life ... that day I finally believed we had number-one material". On Michael's final night working as a DJ, he played the "Careless Whisper" demo. He wrote in his memoir: "They had never heard it before and... the floor filled. I remember thinking – that's a good sign."

== Production ==
"Careless Whisper" (Jerry Wexler version)
A clip from the version recorded with producer Jerry Wexler, which went unused

"Careless Whisper" was not included on the first Wham! album, Fantastic, in 1983. That year, Michael recorded a version with the producer Jerry Wexler at Muscle Shoals Sound Studio in Sheffield, Alabama. Wexler booked Tom Scott to perform the saxophone part, but Michael was not satisfied with his performance. Michael would hum the part to him repeatedly, asking for adjustments. Napier-Bell recalled: "After two hours, he was still there while everyone in the studio shuddered with embarrassment."

Though Napier-Bell and Wexler could not hear what was missing from Scott's performance, Wexler trusted Michael's intuition and felt it would be risky to release the song. He speculated that the saxophone player on the demo had used incorrect fingering, creating a different feel, and that Scott was "just too good to get it". Michael wrote later that the version was too "middle of the road ... It just didn't have any of my character on it." He said he had been in awe of Wexler and had been nervous working with him. Michael took Wexler's advice not to add a key change, saying it was a cliché.

Innervision Records had planned to release "Careless Whisper" in 1983. Michael's song publisher, Dick Leahy, was able to stop the release as Michael controlled the copyright. He said: "We knew how big that song could be, so it was necessary to upset a few people to stop it." Additionally, Michael was committed to touring with Wham! to promote Fantastic, and felt it would not have made sense to release "Careless Whisper" as a solo single at that point.

A few weeks after the Muscle Shoals session, Michael contacted Chris Porter, who had produced some of Wham!'s second album, Make It Big, and asked him to help record another version of "Careless Whisper". They recorded it at Sarm West Studio 2, London, with a live rhythm section. Michael felt the results were better as he was more relaxed and the Sarm musicians did a better job, but the saxophone part had still not been recorded. According to Porter, they auditioned 11 saxophone players before Steve Gregory, who could perform the main phrase in one breath. Gregory said he was the ninth to audition. Another player, Ray Warleigh, waited until midnight for Michael to arrive and went home, giving his position to Gregory.

According to Gregory, the part would have been easier on an alto saxophone, but Michael insisted on tenor and Gregory's saxophone was unable to play the top note without the use of fake fingering. At Gregory's suggestion, Porter lowered the recording by a semitone by slowing the tape, Gregory performed the part in a lower key using the proper fingering, and the recording was returned to the original speed. Michael was satisfied with the part. Ridgeley wrote, "At last the nuanced melody that had lived inside his head for so long found expression from a saxophonist with soul and sensibility as well as virtuosity. George had recorded his first masterpiece and nobody was more pleased about it than I was." Michael recorded his vocals at Advision Studios in Fitzrovia, London.

== Release ==
"Careless Whisper" was released on Wham!'s second album, Make It Big, in 1984. It was released as a single on 23 July. It entered the UK singles chart and reached number one two weeks later, displacing "Two Tribes" by Frankie Goes to Hollywood. It stayed at number one for three weeks and became the UK's fifth-best-selling single that year. It reached number one in 25 other countries, including the US Billboard Hot 100 in February 1985. It was named Billboard's number-one song of 1985.

The "Careless Whisper" single was credited to Michael as part of the strategy to transition him to a solo artist. Michael told the media it was issued as a solo record as it did not fit the style of Wham!, but told his management that Wham! would break up. In the US, where Wham! were less well known, it was credited to "Wham! featuring George Michael".

== Critical reception ==
Billboard wrote that "Careless Whisper" "will tug at many a heartstring". Cash Box said it illustrates Wham!'s "versatility and range" when compared to the previous single "Wake Me Up Before You Go-Go", calling this song "soft, beguiling and memorable" and saying that it features "a highly romantic instrumental arrangement as well as an extremely well-written melody and lyric".

In 2016, Rolling Stone named "Careless Whisper" Michael's second-best song, describing it as "a soulful, saxophone-laden ballad." In 2021, Alexis Petridis of The Guardian named it Michael's fifth-best song, writing: "It's a brilliant pop song [...] and, in 'guilty feet have got no rhythm', it boasts one of the great once-heard-never-forgotten lyrics." Amy Hanson of AllMusic said it was "perfect for dance floor canoodling ... 'Careless Whisper' touched fans and passive listeners alike to become one of, if not the only, love songs of 1985." Michael wrote in 1991 that it "was not an integral part of my emotional development ... It disappoints me that you can write a lyric very flippantly—and not a particularly good lyric—and it can mean so much to so many people. That's disillusioning for a writer."

== Music video ==
The music video (which uses the shorter single version instead of the full album version) was directed by Duncan Gibbins (who previously directed "Club Tropicana") and shows the guilt felt by a man (portrayed by Michael) over an affair, and his acknowledgement that his partner (Lisa Stahl) is going to find out. Madeline Andrews-Hodge plays the woman who lures George away. It was filmed on location in Miami, Florida, in February 1984 and features such locales as Coconut Grove and Watson Island. The final part of the video shows Michael leaning out of a top floor balcony of Miami's Grove Towers.

Filming took place in and around hotels and marinas in Coconut Grove, Miami. According to Napier-Bell, Michael was unhappy with the rushes from the first day's filming, feeling his hair looked "dreadful ... Too long. Too posey. Too poofy." He had his sister, Melanie, flown to Miami to cut it and the first day's filming was reshot, sending the video £17,000 over budget and triggering coverage in the British tabloids. According to the producer Jon Roseman, the production was "a fucking disaster". According to Michael's co-star, Lisa Stahl, the kissing scene had to be reshot after footage was lost. The video was uploaded to YouTube in 2009 and reached one billion views in March 2023.

== Track listings ==
All tracks are written by George Michael and Andrew Ridgeley.

7-inch: Epic / A 4603 (UK)
No.	Title	Length
1.	"Careless Whisper"	5:02
2.	"Careless Whisper" (instrumental)	5:00

7": Columbia / 13-68713 (US)
No.	Title	Length
1.	"Careless Whisper"	4:50
2.	"Careless Whisper" (instrumental)	4:50

12-inch: Epic / TA4603 (UK)
No.	Title	Length
1.	"Careless Whisper" (extended mix)	6:31
2.	"Careless Whisper" (instrumental)	5:02

12-inch: Columbia / 44-05170 (US)
No.	Title	Length
1.	"Careless Whisper" (extended mix)	6:20
2.	"Careless Whisper" (instrumental)	4:52

12-inch: Columbia promotional / AS-1980 (US)
No.	Title	Length
1.	"Careless Whisper"	4:50
2.	"Careless Whisper"	4:50

12-inch maxi: Epic / QTA 4603 (UK) – Special Edition
No.	Title	Length
1.	"Careless Whisper" (extended mix)	6:31
2.	"Careless Whisper" (Jerry Wexler special version)	5:34
3.	"Careless Whisper" (condensed instrumental version)	4:52

- The "extended mix" is identical to the album version from Make It Big.

== Personnel ==
Credits adapted from the extended mix's liner notes, unless otherwise noted.

- Trevor Murrell – drums (Note: The name of Wham!'s drummer was Trevor Murrell. He is listed in the liner notes as Trevor Morrell.)
- Deon Estus – bass guitar
- Hugh Burns – electric guitar
- Chris Parren – keyboards
- Danny Cummings – percussion
- George Michael – lead and backing vocals
- Andrew Ridgeley – acoustic guitar (uncredited)
- Steve Gregory – saxophone
- Andy Richards – keyboards
- Anne Dudley – keyboards

== Charts ==
=== Weekly charts ===
Chart (1984–2017)	Peak position
Australia (Kent Music Report)	1
Austria (Ö3 Austria Top 40)	2
Belgium (Ultratop 50 Flanders)	2
Bolivia (UPI)	1
Canada Top Singles (RPM)	1
Canada Adult Contemporary (RPM)	1
Canada (The Record)	2
Europe (European Hot 100 Singles)	2
Finland (Suomen virallinen lista)	2
France (SNEP)	3
Hungary (Single Top 40)	10
Iceland (RÚV)	1
Ireland (IRMA)	1
Israel (Media Forest)	4
Italy (Musica e dischi)	1
Japan Hot 100 (Billboard)	31
Japan (Oricon)	12
Netherlands (Dutch Top 40)	1
Netherlands (Single Top 100)	1
New Zealand (Recorded Music NZ)	3
Norway (VG-lista)	2
Panama (UPI)	2
Peru (UPI)	1
Portugal (AFP)	2
Slovenia (SloTop50)	29
South Africa (Springbok)	1
Spain (PROMUSICAE)	11
Sweden (Sverigetopplistan)	2
Switzerland (Schweizer Hitparade)	1
UK Singles (Official Charts)	1
US Billboard Hot 100	1
US Adult Contemporary (Billboard)	1
US Hot Dance Singles Sales (Billboard)	3
US Hot Black Singles (Billboard)	8
West Germany (GfK)	3

Chart (2021)	Peak position
Global 200 (Billboard)	111

Chart (2024–2026)	Peak position
Greece International (IFPI)	63
UK Singles (Official Charts)	69

=== Year-end charts ===
Chart (1984)	Position
Australia (Kent Music Report)	4
Austria (Ö3 Austria Top 40)	18
Belgium (Ultratop Flanders)	5
Netherlands (Dutch Top 40)	3
Netherlands (Single Top 100)	2
New Zealand (Recorded Music NZ)	10
Switzerland (Schweizer Hitparade)	9
UK Singles (OCC)	5
West Germany (Official German Charts)	31

Chart (1985)	Position
Canada Top Singles (RPM)	2
South Africa (Springbok)	3
US Billboard Hot 100	1
US Adult Contemporary (Billboard)	4

=== All-time charts ===
Chart (1958–2018)	Position
US Billboard Hot 100	162

== Certifications and sales ==
Region	Certification	Certified units/sales
Australia (ARIA)	2× Platinum	140,000^{‡}
Brazil (Pro-Música Brasil)	3× Platinum	180,000^{‡}
Canada (Music Canada)	5× Platinum	400,000^{‡}
Denmark (IFPI Danmark)	Platinum	90,000^{‡}
France (SNEP)	Silver	500,000
Germany (BVMI)	Gold	300,000^{‡}
Italy (FIMI)	Platinum	50,000^{‡}
Japan	—	204,000
Netherlands (NVPI)	Platinum	100,000^{^}
New Zealand (RMNZ)	3× Platinum	90,000^{‡}
Portugal (AFP)	Platinum	40,000^{^}
Spain (Promusicae)	Platinum	60,000^{‡}
United Kingdom (BPI) Physical	Platinum	1,200,000
United Kingdom (BPI) Digital	3× Platinum	1,800,000^{‡}
United States (RIAA)	7× Platinum	7,000,000^{‡}
Streaming
Greece (IFPI Greece)	2× Platinum	4,000,000^{†}
Summaries
Worldwide	—	6,000,000
^{^} Shipments figures based on certification alone.^{‡} Sales+streaming figures based on certification alone.^{†} Streaming-only figures based on certification alone.

== Sarah Washington version ==
In 1993, a dance version by English singer Sarah Washington peaked at number 45 on the UK Singles Chart and No. 20 on the Irish Singles Chart.

=== Charts ===
Chart (1993–1994)	Peak position
Australia (ARIA)	78
Europe (Eurochart Hot 100)	90
Ireland (IRMA)	20
UK Singles (OCC)	45
UK Airplay (ERA)	86

== See also ==
- List of best-selling singles
- List of best-selling singles in the United Kingdom
- List of number-one singles in Australia during the 1980s
- List of Dutch Top 40 number-one singles of 1984
- List of number-one singles of 1984 (Ireland)
- List of number-one hits of 1984 (Switzerland)
- List of number-one singles from the 1980s (UK)
- List of RPM number-one singles of 1985
- List of Hot 100 number-one singles of 1985 (U.S.)
- List of number-one adult contemporary singles of 1985 (U.S.)
