= Fantastic (Wham! album) =

Studio album by Wham!
- Released: 1 July 1983
- Recorded: 1982–1983
- Studio: Maison Rouge (London)
- Genres: Pop; dance-pop; post-disco
- Length: 36:42
- Labels: Innervision; Columbia
- Producers: Steve Brown; George Michael; Bob Carter

Wham! chronology
| Fantastic (1983) | Make It Big (1984) |

Singles from Fantastic
- 1. "Wham Rap! (Enjoy What You Do)" Released: 28 May 1982; 2. "Young Guns (Go for It)" Released: 17 September 1982; 3. "Wham Rap! (Enjoy What You Do) (special U.S. re-mix)" Released: January 1983; 4. "Bad Boys" Released: 6 May 1983; 5. "Club Tropicana" Released: 22 July 1983

Professional ratings
Review scores
| Source | Rating |
|---|---|
| AllMusic | 2.5/5 stars |
| Q | 3/5 stars |
| Rolling Stone | 2/5 stars |
| Uncut | 4/5 stars |

Fantastic is the debut studio album by the English pop duo Wham!, released on 1 July 1983 by Innervision Records. It reached number one on the UK Albums Chart. It included the previously released singles "Wham Rap! (Enjoy What You Do)", "Young Guns (Go for It)", and "Bad Boys". "Club Tropicana" was released as a single to coincide with the album's release. Although not on the album, "Club Fantastic Megamix" (a medley of songs from the album) was released against the band's wishes by Innervision soon after Fantastic, and whilst they were in proceedings to leave the label.

== Background ==
In 1975, George Michael and Andrew Ridgeley met as pre-teens at Bushey Meads School in Bushey, Hertfordshire. Upon realising they shared a common interest in music, the two became close friends. During 1979 and 1980, Michael and Ridgeley performed in a ska revival band called the Executive, alongside Ridgeley's brother Paul, David Mortimer, Andrew Leaver, Jamie Gould and Tony Bywaters. The group was relatively short-lived, and following its break-up, Michael and Ridgeley formed Wham!.

Prior to the recording of their first demo tape, Michael and Ridgeley had already written some songs together. The genesis of "Wham Rap! (Enjoy What You Do)" involved Ridgeley shouting the words "Wham! Bam! I am the man!" to the beat of "Rapper's Delight" by the Sugarhill Gang while dancing at Bogart's club in South Harrow, London. On "Club Tropicana", the duo had taken inspiration from their experience of dancing in nightclubs (such as the Le Beat Route) and "the hedonism of London's New Romantic hangouts, like the Blitz," while "Careless Whisper" – a pop ballad touching on the subject of infidelity – would later be recorded by Michael as a solo single and included on Wham!'s second studio album, Make It Big (1984).

== Production ==
According to Ridgeley in his 2019 book Wham! George & Me, it was during the early stages of writing and recording of this album that the pair agreed that Michael should take sole responsibility for writing the group's material. When work started in the studio, Michael—according to Ridgeley—started working "at lightning speed", and it quickly became clear that he was by far the better songwriter. Ridgeley would later say that it was not something that he particularly wanted, but there was no doubt it was the way to go to achieve the success they both wanted. Two new songs, "Golden Soul" and "Soul Boy", were written for the album but both were shelved as "neither of them were any good".

The album features a hidden track (played on a honky-tonk-style piano) after the final 20 seconds of "Young Guns (Go for It!)".

In the US, the album was originally released as the group "WHAM! U.K.", due to a conflict with a US group with the same name (Columbia BFC-38911).

== Promotion ==
In order to promote Fantastic, Wham! embarked on a tour of the UK, opening at Aberdeen's Capitol Theatre on 9 October 1983, before going on to dates in Scotland, England and Wales, and ending on 30 November at the Centre in Brighton.

== Track listing ==
=== Original ===
All tracks are written by George Michael, except where noted.

Side one
| No. | Title | Writer(s) | Length |
|---|---|---|---|
| 1. | "Bad Boys" | | 3:19 |
| 2. | "A Ray of Sunshine" | | 4:43 |
| 3. | "Love Machine" (The Miracles cover) | Pete Moore; Billy Griffin | 3:19 |
| 4. | "Wham Rap! (Enjoy What You Do)" | Michael; Andrew Ridgeley | 6:41 |

Side two
| No. | Title | Writer(s) | Length |
|---|---|---|---|
| 5. | "Club Tropicana" | Michael; Ridgeley | 4:28 |
| 6. | "Nothing Looks the Same in the Light" | | 5:53 |
| 7. | "Come On" | | 4:24 |
| 8. | "Young Guns (Go for It)" | | 3:55 |
| Total length: | | | 36:42 |

=== Reissue ===
The track listing of the first edition of the CD and the original cassette tape feature three bonus tracks interspersed within the original track listing, consisting of instrumental remixes. This track listing was again used for the 1998 reissue of the CD.

| No. | Title | Writer(s) | Length |
|---|---|---|---|
| 1. | "Bad Boys" | | 3:19 |
| 2. | "A Ray of Sunshine" | | 4:43 |
| 3. | "Love Machine" | Moore; Griffin | 3:19 |
| 4. | "Wham Rap! (Enjoy What You Do)" | Michael; Ridgeley | 6:41 |
| 5. | "A Ray of Sunshine" (instrumental remix) | | 5:40 |
| 6. | "Love Machine" (instrumental remix) | Moore; Griffin | 3:28 |
| 7. | "Club Tropicana" | Michael; Ridgeley | 4:28 |
| 8. | "Nothing Looks the Same in the Light" | | 5:53 |
| 9. | "Come On" | | 4:24 |
| 10. | "Young Guns (Go for It!)" | | 3:55 |
| 11. | "Nothing Looks the Same in the Light" (instrumental remix) | | 6:40 |
| Total length: | | | 52:30 |

== Personnel ==
Wham!

- George Michael – lead vocals (1–4, 7, 8), backing vocals (1–3), arrangements (4–7), all vocals (5, 6), horn arrangements (5), instruments (6)
- Andrew Ridgeley – guitars (1–5, 7, 8), arrangements (4)

Additional musicians

- Jess Bailey – keyboards (1)
- Anne Dudley – keyboards (1, 8)
- Tommy Eyre – keyboards (2, 3, 5, 7)
- Bob Carter – keyboards (4)
- Robert Ahwai – guitars (1–3, 7, 8)
- Deon Estus – bass (1–3, 5, 7), backing vocals (1)
- John McKenzie – bass (4)
- Brad Lang – bass (8)
- Trevor Murrell – drums (1–3, 5, 6)
- Andy Duncan – drums (4), percussion (4, 5)
- Graham Broad – drums (7, 8)
- Luís Jardim – percussion (1, 3)
- Tony Moroni – percussion (2)
- Jeff Daly – saxophones (1)
- David Baptiste – saxophones (2, 3, 7)
- Chris Hunter – saxophones (4)
- Ian Ritchie – saxophones (5), horn arrangements (5)
- Andy Mackintosh – saxophones (8)
- Paul Cox – trumpet (1)
- Martin Drover – trumpet (1)
- Colin Graham – trumpet (2, 3, 7)
- Raul D'Oliveria – trumpet (2, 3, 7)
- Guy Barker – trumpet (4)
- Roddy Lorimer – trumpet (5)
- Bert Ezard – trumpet (8)
- J. Healey – trumpet (8)
- Linton Ace – string arrangements (3)
- Dee C. Lee – backing vocals (1, 8)
- Ruby Mason – backing vocals (1)
- Jimmy Chambers – backing vocals (3)
- George Chandler – backing vocals (3)
- Tony Jackson – backing vocals (3)
- Katie Kissoon – backing vocals (7)
- Stevie Lange – backing vocals (7)
- Sylvia Mason-James – backing vocals (7)
- Lynda Hayes – backing vocals (8)
- Shirlie Holliman – backing vocals (8)
- Josie James – backing vocals (8)

Shouting on "Wham Rap! (Enjoy What You Do?)"

- Bob Carter, George Michael, David Mortimer, Andrew Ridgeley and Paul Ridgeley

Handclaps on "Club Tropicana"

- Deon Estus, Steve Evans, George Michael, Andrew Ridgeley and Phil Wilcox

== Production ==
- George Michael – producer (1–3, 5–8)
- Steve Brown – producer (1–3, 5–8)
- Bob Carter – producer (4)
- Tony Taverner – engineer
- Wham! – cover design
- Shoot That Tiger! – cover design
- Chris Craymer – front cover photography, inner sleeve photography
- Janusz Guttner – inner sleeve photography

== Charts ==
=== Weekly charts ===
Weekly chart performance for Fantastic
| Chart (1983–85) | Peak position |
|---|---|
| Australian Albums (Kent Music Report) | 6 |
| Dutch Albums (Album Top 100) | 8 |
| Finnish Albums (Suomen virallinen lista) | 8 |
| German Albums (Offizielle Top 100) | 7 |
| Japanese Albums (Oricon) | 17 |
| New Zealand Albums (RMNZ) | 1 |
| Norwegian Albums (VG-lista) | 8 |
| Swedish Albums (Sverigetopplistan) | 15 |
| Swiss Albums (Schweizer Hitparade) | 25 |
| UK Albums (Official Charts) | 1 |
| US Billboard 200 | 83 |

| Chart (2024) | Peak position |
|---|---|
| Greek Albums (IFPI) | 70 |
| Hungarian Physical Albums (MAHASZ) | 24 |

=== Year-end charts ===
1983 year-end chart performance for Fantastic
| Chart (1983) | Position |
|---|---|
| Australian Albums (Kent Music Report) | 69 |
| German Albums (Offizielle Top 100) | 37 |
| New Zealand Albums (RMNZ) | 13 |
| UK Albums (OCC) | 5 |

1984 year-end chart performance for Fantastic
| Chart (1984) | Position |
|---|---|
| Japanese Albums (Oricon) | 80 |
| UK Albums (OCC) | 60 |

== Certifications and sales ==
Certifications and sales for Fantastic
| Region | Certification | Certified units/sales |
|---|---|---|
| Australia (ARIA) | Gold | 35,000^{^} |
| Japan | — | 218,000 |
| Netherlands (NVPI) | Gold | 50,000^{^} |
| New Zealand (RMNZ) | Platinum | 15,000^{^} |
| United Kingdom (BPI) | 3× Platinum | 900,000^{^} |
| United States (RIAA) | Gold | 500,000^{^} |
^{^} Shipments figures based on certification alone.
