= Jazz Summers =

British music manager (1944–2015)

- Born: 15 March 1944; Winchester, Hampshire, England, UK
- Died: 14 August 2015 (aged 71)
- Occupation: Music manager
- Notable work: Managed acts such as Snow Patrol, the Verve, Scissor Sisters, Klaxons, and Wham!; Co-founder of Big Life, a music management company
- Spouse(s): Married four times; third wife was the pop singer Yazz

Gordon "Jazz" Summers (15 March 1944 – 14 August 2015) was a British music manager. He managed acts such as Snow Patrol, the Verve, Scissor Sisters and Klaxons. Alongside Simon Napier-Bell, he co-managed Wham! and is credited with having enabled them to break into the United States market in 1985 and to go on to become the first western pop group to tour China.

== Early years ==
Summers was sent to Gordon Boys (a military school in Woking) at the age of 12 and enlisted in the army at the age of 15. He served as a radiographer in Hong Kong and Malaysia. In 1986, he and Tim Parry founded Big Life, a music management company. The two men also operated Big Life Records. Among his other music-related interests was his role as chairman of the Music Managers Forum.

== Personal life ==
Summers was married four times; his third wife was the pop singer Yazz, whom he also managed. He refuted allegations about his conduct, saying "I’ve never burned a venue to the ground. I've never even hit an A&R man. I locked one in a cupboard once, as punishment for some racism and sexism." His autobiography, Big Life, was published in September 2013.

== Posthumous tributes ==
Summers died on 14 August 2015 after suffering from lung cancer for two years. He was survived by his wife Dianna, and three daughters. After his death, tributes were made on Twitter by Tim Burgess, The Futureheads, Boy George and Zane Lowe
