= Andrew Ridgeley =

English musician (born 1963)

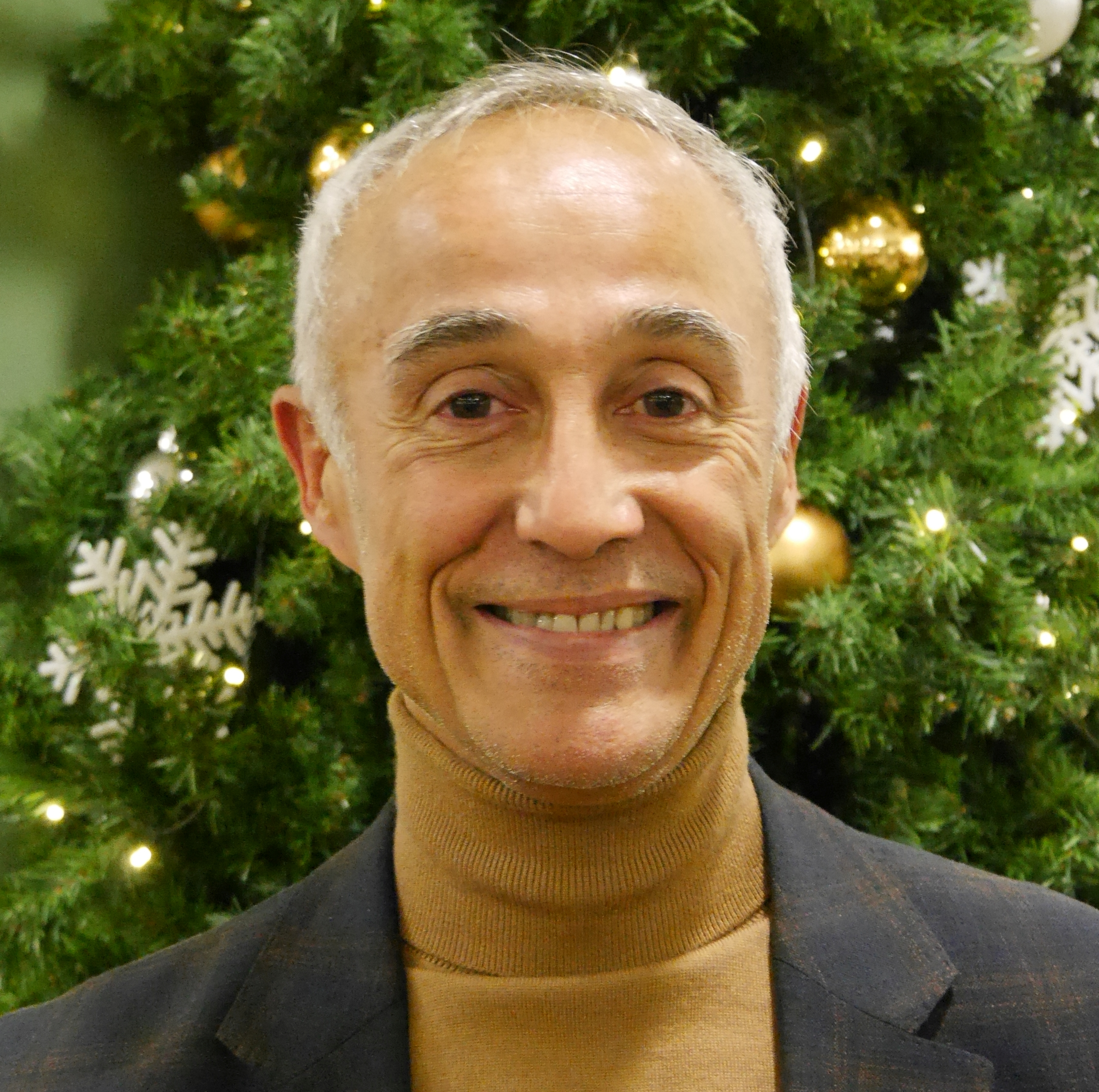
- Ridgeley in 2019

Background information
- Born: Andrew John Ridgeley; 26 January 1963 (age 63); Windlesham, Surrey, England
- Genres: Pop; rock
- Occupations: Musician; singer; songwriter; record producer
- Instruments: Guitar; vocals
- Years active: 1981–1991; 2005; 2018–present
- Labels: Innervision; Epic; Columbia
- Formerly of: Wham!

Andrew John Ridgeley (born 26 January 1963) is an English musician. He is best known for his work in the 1980s in the musical duo Wham!, which consisted of Ridgeley and George Michael. Wham! were one of the most successful pop acts during the 1980s, selling more than 30 million certified records worldwide from 1982 to 1986. They scored five number one hits in the UK, and two of their singles, "Wake Me Up Before You Go-Go", "Everything She Wants" also topped the US Billboard Hot 100. (Note: the single "Careless Whisper" was credited to 'Wham! featuring George Michael' in the US, but is actually a George Michael solo record and Ridgeley was not involved in it) In 2019, Penguin Random House published Ridgeley's memoir Wham! George & Me.

== Early life ==
Ridgeley was born in 1963 in Windlesham, Surrey, to Jennifer Jill (née Dunlop; 1943–2009) and Alberto Mario Zacharia (1933–2015), who later changed his surname to Ridgeley. His mother was of English and Scottish descent, while his Jewish father was also of Italian, Yemeni and Egyptian origin. Ridgeley's father's family were expelled from Egypt as a result of the Suez Crisis. He has one sibling, Paul, born February 1964. Ridgeley was raised in Bushey, Hertfordshire, and attended Bushey Meads School. His mother was a schoolteacher at Bushey Heath Primary School, and his father worked for Canon. When George Michael started school, Ridgeley volunteered to take him under his wing.

== Career ==
After the break-up of the short-lived group The Executive (of which Ridgeley, his brother Paul, and Michael were members), Michael and Ridgeley formed the duo Wham! in 1981. The former was the lead vocalist, primary songwriter, and played keyboards, while the latter co-wrote songs, played guitar, and performed backing vocals. They approached various record labels with a homemade demo tape–which took ten minutes to record in Ridgeley's living room–and signed with Innervision Records (distributed by CBS Records). After one album, the duo signed with Epic Records/CBS.

=== Wham! ===
Wham! topped the UK album charts with their first album, Fantastic, which yielded four top ten hits. Their second album, Make It Big, gave them their US breakthrough, producing three No. 1 singles on both the UK and US charts. In 1984, Ridgeley underwent surgery to have his septum straightened to improve his breathing after having broken his nose at age nine. After photos were published in British newspapers showing Ridgeley's bandaged face, Wham!'s manager, Simon Napier-Bell, fabricated a story that the bandages were the result of Ridgeley having been hit in the nose in a nightclub. After days of tabloid headlines, the true reason was revealed.

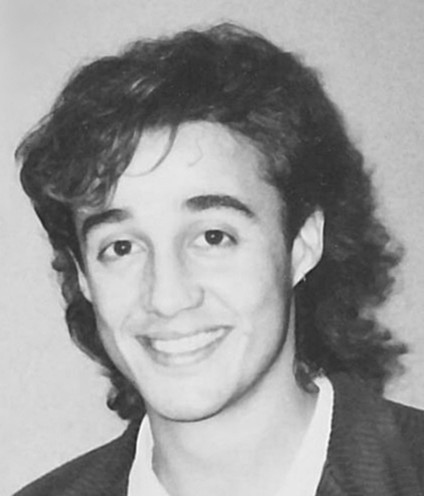
Ridgeley in 1985

In 1984, Wham! charted two UK No. 1 singles, and were competing that year with pop rivals Duran Duran to be Britain's biggest pop act. Toward this end, Napier-Bell devised a publicity scheme that he believed would turn them into major international stars: In April 1985, he took Wham! to China for a ten-day visit. They gained huge worldwide media attention when Wham! became the first Western pop group to play in China: after two warm-up shows in Hong Kong, they played a show in Beijing in front of 15,000 people at the Worker's Gymnasium, and one final show in Canton. The visit was recorded for a documentary film titled Wham! in China: Foreign Skies. In 1985, Ridgeley performed at the Live Aid charity concert with other backing singers, while Michael performed with Elton John.

By 1985, Ridgeley had developed a reputation in the tabloid press as a drunken party animal at nightclubs; the British tabloids referred to him as "Animal Andy" and "Randy Andy". In 1986, "The Edge of Heaven" became Wham!'s fourth and final UK No. 1 single. With Michael keen to move into a more adult market, the duo broke up after a farewell concert dubbed "The Final" in front of 72,000 people at Wembley Stadium on 28 June 1986.

=== Post-Wham! ===
Shortly after the breakup, Ridgeley moved to Monaco and tried Formula Three motor racing. Meeting with little success, he moved to Los Angeles in pursuit of a career in acting. He returned to Britain permanently in 1990. CBS Records (later Sony Music), having taken up the option on Wham!'s contract that specified solo albums from Michael and Ridgeley, released a guitar- and drum-driven solo recording from Ridgeley, Son of Albert, in 1990. His brother Paul, an occasional percussionist for Bananarama, played drums on the album, while Paul Gray, bassist with early punk rock band the Damned, played the bass.

The first single from the album was "Shake"; it reached No. 16 on the Australian singles chart and No. 58 in the UK Singles Chart. "Shake" was the 81st highest-selling single of 1990 in Australia. The second single, "Red Dress", charted in Australia but peaked outside the Top 100. Son of Albert sold poorly, failing to make the top 75 in the UK Albums Chart. It was also one of the worst received albums of 1990 among critics, achieving only half a star in a savage Rolling Stone magazine review. As a result, CBS passed up the option of a second album. Ridgeley later said, "It was disappointing and depressing to receive quite such a beating over that album."

On 27 January 1991, Ridgeley joined Michael on stage for a few songs at the encore of his Rock in Rio event at the Maracanã Stadium in Rio de Janeiro. Since 1991, Ridgeley has generally shunned publicity. He appeared as a studio guest on the first series of the BBC 2 programme Fantasy Football League in 1994, and gave an on-camera interview for the first time since the split in a 2005 documentary, A Different Story, about the life of George Michael.

In 2005, Ridgeley and Michael made plans to reunite as Wham! for Live 8, but Ridgeley reportedly pulled out at the last minute. In 2012, Michael dismissed rumours that they were set for a reunion to mark the 30th anniversary of their first record. Michael said that there was no truth in speculation the group would reform for a one-off concert.

Upon hearing of Michael's death on 25 December 2016, Ridgeley paid his respects on Twitter, saying, "Heartbroken at the loss of my beloved friend Yog." Ridgeley performed a cameo role in Last Christmas, a 2019 film that featured many songs by Wham! Ridgeley inducted Michael into the Rock and Roll Hall of Fame in 2023.

== Charitable work ==
Ridgeley has several times participated in the Dallaglio Cycle Slam, a charity bike ride for the Dallaglio Rugby Works, established in 2009 by former England rugby captain Lawrence Dallaglio, which helps young people tackle life in a positive way with the help of rugby. Ridgeley is a keen road cyclist and featured in a Sigma Sport "Cafe Ride" interview with former British cycling road race champion Matt Stephens in 2024. In 2024, Ridgeley attended the St. George's Society of New York's British Bash, and was awarded their Anglo-American Cultural Award.

== Personal life ==
From 1990 to 2017, Ridgeley was in a relationship with Keren Woodward, a member of the group Bananarama. They lived with her son in a restored 15th-century farm property near Wadebridge, Cornwall. Ridgeley announced he was dating socialite Amanda Cronin in summer 2022; they separated in May 2023.

He is a supporter of Queens Park Rangers.

== Discography ==
=== Solo ===
- Son of Albert (1990)

=== With Wham! ===
- Fantastic (1983)
- Make It Big (1984)
- Music from the Edge of Heaven (1986)
