= Simon Napier-Bell =

English record producer, music manager, author and journalist

- Born: Simon Robert Napier-Bell; 22 April 1939 (age 87); Ealing, London, England
- Occupations: Pop manager, author, journalist
- Partner: Yotin Chaijanla
- Website: Official website

Simon Robert Napier-Bell (born 22 April 1939) is an English record producer, music manager, author and journalist. At different times, he has managed artists as diverse as the Yardbirds, John's Children, Marc Bolan, Japan, London, Sinéad O'Connor, Ultravox, Boney M, Sinitta, Wham!, Blue Mercedes, Alsou and Candi Staton, among others.

Napier-Bell has written two volumes of music history, focusing on the history of the music industry since the 18th century. He has also written two memoirs about his own experiences in the music industry.

== Early years ==
Napier-Bell attended Durston House in Ealing, and then later a primary school at Perivale. He then attended Harrow County School for Boys and Bryanston School in Dorset. Whilst at Bryanston, he formed the school's first jazz band. When he left school at the age of 17, it was with the idea of becoming a professional musician, preferably in America. A year later, unable to get a visa to the United States, he emigrated to Canada.

== Career ==
=== Songwriter ===
When he returned to England, Napier-Bell worked as an assistant film editor. With a thorough knowledge of music, he soon progressed to being a music editor and landed the job of working with Burt Bacharach on What's New Pussycat, re-editing the score Bacharach had written for it. Later, Napier-Bell also scored, wrote and edited music for Here We Go Round the Mulberry Bush (1967), a film directed by Clive Donner.

In 1966, Dusty Springfield approached Napier-Bell and Vicki Wickham to write an English lyric to an Italian song she had heard at the Sanremo Festival, composed by Pino Donaggio. The result was "You Don't Have to Say You Love Me", which became Springfield's only number one hit in the UK Singles Chart.

=== Manager ===
A friend, Vicki Wickham, who booked all the acts for the TV show Ready Steady Go!, persuaded him to move into music management. He began by putting together an act himself; Nicky Scott & Diane Ferraz; a boy from London and a girl from the West Indies. The inter-racial mix was a first for the British music business. The Yardbirds asked him if he would manage them. They were looking for a replacement for their original manager, Giorgio Gomelsky. With the group's bassist, Paul Samwell-Smith, Napier-Bell then co-produced the Yardbirds' first studio album, Roger the Engineer. He oversaw the entry of Jimmy Page into the group and produced the group's next single, "Happenings Ten Years Time Ago", considered one of the most avant garde rock records of the time.

Napier-Bell managed John's Children, who were better known for their ability to shock rather than for their music, and who were thrown off a major tour of Germany for upstaging The Who, with an act that included running round the audience throwing feathers in the air and whipping each other with chains.

Napier-Bell teamed up with Ray Singer to produce records for various artists including the Scaffold (a group which included Paul McCartney's brother, Mike McGear), Peter Sarstedt, Forever More (which went on to change itself into The Average White Band) and lesser known acts, Plus and Brut. He also spent a year in Australia where he worked for Albert Productions and produced acts such as Alison McCallum, Bobbi Marchini and John Paul Young (who later credited Napier-Bell with having discovered him).

Following this, he worked in Spain and South America for two years, managing one of Spain's biggest stars, Júnior, with whom he co-wrote several Spanish hits, in particular the biggest selling Spanish language single of the 1970s, "Perdóname". In 1976, he came back to London and returned to management with two new groups, London, a group in the then current punk vein, and Japan, an art-rock group. London was a short-lived project, but Japan involved him for the next seven years. Napier-Bell persevered with them through five lean years to eventually help make them one of the most influential groups of the early 1980s.

Napier-Bell then established an association with manager Jazz Summers and together they took on the management of Wham!. The group had previously had three hit singles in the UK but wanted to terminate their contract with the record company, Innervision. Napier-Bell and Summers led them through four months of legal complications (during which they were unable to record), and finally settled the case by signing a new contract with CBS. Napier-Bell spent eighteen months travelling back and forth to China negotiating for Wham! to become the first ever Western pop artist to play in communist China. They eventually played a concert there in April 1985 at the Worker's Stadium in Beijing.

At the end of 1985, Wham! ended its relationship with Napier-Bell and Summers when George Michael left Wham! for a solo career. Napier-Bell went on to manage the duo Blue Mercedes, who had one worldwide hit, "I Want To Be Your Property" (1987). He arranged for the defunct pop group Boney M. to reform and had all their old tracks remixed by Stock Aitken Waterman. The result was an album that stayed at number one in the French charts for four months but sold little elsewhere.

Following this, Napier-Bell collaborated with another manager, Harry Cowell, and they took on the management of two once major groups looking to revive their careers – Asia and Ultravox. Asia fared better than Ultravox, but eventually Napier-Bell gave up on both of them and spent three years writing a book, Black Vinyl White Powder. He returned to artist management, this time working in Russia, first managing Alsou, a girl singer, then Smash!!, a boy duo with Wham! similarities In 2013, he joined forces with Dutch entrepreneur Björn de Water by setting up Snap-B Music Ltd, a music consultancy company offering advice to artist managers. Napier-Bell terminated his directorship of the company in 2016 but remains a consultant.

Napier-Bell's long running Las Vegas production, Raiding the Rock Vault, celebrated over 1,500 performances, and concluded its residency in Las Vegas in December 2025.

=== Author ===
When Japan broke up, Napier-Bell wrote his first memoir, You Don't Have to Say You Love Me, about his experiences in the music business in the 1960s. When he ceased managing Asia and Ultravox, he wrote Black Vinyl White Powder; originally conceived as a history of the British post-war music industry, it developed during the writing process into an exploration of "the centrality of drugs and drug culture to the development of the British music business" In March 2005, he published another memoir, I'm Coming to Take You to Lunch, the story of how he took Wham! to China.

In 2015, Unbound Books published his fourth book, Ta-Ra-Ra-Boom-De-Ay, which is a complete history of the music industry since the early 18th century until today. All four books have received multiple reviews.

=== Documentaries ===
In 2023, Napier-Bell directed the documentary George Michael: Portrait of an Artist, a film which offered chronological optics into the life of Michael, featuring interviews with Stephen Fry, Stevie Wonder, and Rufus Wainwright. Napier-Bell is currently filming a documentary about the Marquee Club, which will feature interviews with Phil Collins and Tony Banks.

In recent years, Napier-Bell has directed three full-length documentary films. To Be Frank, about Frank Sinatra, and 27: Gone Too Soon, about the 27 Club, were both made for Netflix. 50 Years Legal, marking 50 years since the decriminalisation of homosexuality in the UK, was produced for Sky Arts.

Napier-Bell is CEO of the Pierbel Group, which offers music management and consultancy, and is originating producer of Raiding the Rock Vault, the No 1 rated music show in Las Vegas, and Raiding the Country Vault, in Branson, Missouri.

== Digital journalism ==
Since late 2025, Napier-Bell has been publishing weekly essays on his Substack, with content that focuses on music industry economics, the "mythmaking" of pop icons, and the impact of artificial intelligence on human creativity.

== Personal life ==
Napier-Bell is an atheist and openly gay.
