= Wake Me Up Before You Go-Go =

1984 single by Wham!

- Standard artwork by Peter Saville and Trevor Key

Single by Wham!

from the album Make It Big
- B-side: "Wake Me Up Before You Go-Go" (instrumental)
- Released: 14 May 1984
- Recorded: 1984
- Studio: Sarm West, London
- Genre: Dance-pop; bubblegum
- Length: 3:51; 4:03 (instrumental)
- Label: Columbia; Epic
- Songwriter: George Michael
- Producer: George Michael

Wham! singles chronology
"Club Fantastic Megamix" (1983)	"Wake Me Up Before You Go-Go" (1984)	"Careless Whisper" (1984)

Music video
- "Wake Me Up Before You Go-Go" on YouTube

Alternative cover
- US release of the original 1984 single

"Wake Me Up Before You Go-Go" is a song by British pop duo Wham!, first released as a single in the UK on 14 May 1984. It became their first UK and US number one hit. It was written and produced by George Michael. The single was certified platinum in the US, which at the time commemorated sales of over two million copies. The music video features Michael and bandmate Andrew Ridgeley wearing oversized message T-shirts ("CHOOSE LIFE") created by Katharine Hamnett, starting a craze covered in the 2002 VH1 series I Love the 80s. The song was ranked number 28 on VH1's 100 Greatest Songs of the '80s.

== Writing and production ==
George Michael's inspiration for "Wake Me Up Before You Go-Go" was a scribbled note that his bandmate Andrew Ridgeley had left for his parents, intended to read "wake me up before you go" but with "up" accidentally written twice, so Ridgeley wrote "go" twice on purpose. In 1984, Michael had this to say on the development of the song:

I just wanted to make a really energetic pop record that had all the best elements of Fifties and Sixties records, combined with our attitude and our approach, which is obviously more uptempo and a lot younger than some of those records. It's one of those tracks that gets rid of a lot of your own personal influences; it reminds me of so many different records that I couldn't actually nail them down. I'd done a demo at home that just had a bass line and a vocal on it. Usually, I write the record in my head; I know what all the parts are going to be and I sing them to all our musicians. And it was great. ... We actually did it as a rehearsal. We used a LinnDrum because the drummer was late, and it was such a good track that we kept it.

"Wake Me Up Before You Go-Go" was recorded within two days at Sarm West Studio 2 in London, with a live rhythm section. The song, according to Michael, had been done in one take without any drop-ins (overdubs) at all—‌production-wise, he noted that the two options to him were "either to be like Trevor Horn and go for stunning sounds on your own, or just get a great sound on each instrument and go for a live take". The UK sleeve was designed by Peter Saville, with photography by Trevor Key.

== Reception ==
Upon its release, "Wake Me Up Before You Go-Go" received a mixed reception from contemporary critics. Smash Hits' Dave Rimmer deemed it "An absolutely dreadful comeback in which George and Andy ditch everything they do well in favour of a feeble foray into Shakin' Stevens country.(...) Awful.". While Cash Box said that "the Motown groove and patent vocals of 'Wake Me Up Before You Go-Go' are perfect CHR material which is executed expertly by this British duo." The song entered the UK Singles Chart at number four and climbed to the top spot seven days later, staying there for two weeks. The song also went to the top of the Billboard Hot 100 in the United States, holding the top spot for three weeks.

== Music video ==
The music video for "Wake Me Up Before You Go-Go" was directed by Andy Morahan. It showcases the band performing for an audience of mostly teenagers at Brixton Academy in South London. The band wore Katharine Hamnett T-shirt designs that said "CHOOSE LIFE".

== Track listing ==
All tracks are written by George Michael.

7-inch: Epic / A 4440 (UK)
No.	Title	Length
1.	"Wake Me Up Before You Go-Go"	3:51
2.	"Wake Me Up Before You Go-Go" (instrumental)	4:03

Note:

- The US 7-inch single (Columbia 04552) has identical track listing.
- Also released as a CD single in 1999

12-inch: Epic / TA 4440 (UK)
No.	Title	Length
1.	"Wake Me Up Before You Go-Go"	3:51
2.	"A Ray of Sunshine" (specially recorded for The Tube)	4:58
3.	"Wake Me Up Before You Go-Go" (instrumental)	4:03

== Charts ==
=== Weekly charts ===
Weekly chart performance for "Wake Me Up Before You Go-Go"
Chart (1984–1985)	Peak position
Australia (Kent Music Report)	1
Austria (Ö3 Austria Top 40)	6
Belgium (Ultratop 50 Flanders)	1
Belgium (VRT Top 30 Flanders)	1
Canada (The Record)	2
Canada Adult Contemporary (RPM)	1
Canada Top Singles (RPM)	1
Denmark (Hitlisten)	6
Europe (Eurochart Hot 100)	1
Finland Jukebox (Suomen virallinen lista)	10
Finland (Suomen virallinen lista)	3
France (SNEP)	17
Guatemala (UPI)	4
Hungary (Single Top 40)	20
Iceland (RÚV)	1
Ireland (IRMA)	1
Italy (Musica e dischi)	24
Netherlands (Dutch Top 40)	1
Netherlands (Single Top 100)	1
New Zealand (Recorded Music NZ)	2
Norway (VG-lista)	1
Paraguay (UPI)	1
South Africa (Springbok Radio)	9
Sweden (Sverigetopplistan)	1
Switzerland (Schweizer Hitparade)	2
UK Singles (Official Charts)	1
US Billboard Hot 100	1
US Adult Contemporary (Billboard)	4
US Dance Club Songs (Billboard)	27
US Cash Box	1
US Contemporary Hit Radio (Radio & Records)	1
West Germany (GfK)	2

2025 chart performance for "Wake Me Up Before You Go-Go"
Chart (2025)	Peak position
Poland (Polish Airplay Top 100)	63

=== Year-end charts ===
1984 year-end chart performance for "Wake Me Up Before You Go-Go"
Chart (1984)	Position
Australia (Kent Music Report)	5
Belgium (Ultratop 50 Flanders)	4
Canada (RPM Top 100 Singles)	6
Israel	8
Netherlands (Dutch Top 40)	9
Netherlands (Single Top 100)	17
New Zealand (Recorded Music NZ)	23
Switzerland (Schweizer Hitparade)	8
UK Singles (OCC)	11
US Cash Box	19
West Germany (Official German Charts)	23

1985 year-end chart performance for "Wake Me Up Before You Go-Go"
Chart (1985)	Position
US Billboard Hot 100	3

== Certifications ==
Certifications for "Wake Me Up Before You Go-Go"
Region	Certification	Certified units/sales
Australia (ARIA)	2× Platinum	140,000^{‡}
Canada (Music Canada)	Platinum	100,000^{^}
Denmark (IFPI Danmark)	2× Platinum	180,000^{‡}
Germany (BVMI)	Gold	250,000^{‡}
Italy (FIMI)	Platinum	50,000^{‡}
Netherlands (NVPI)	Gold	75,000^{^}
New Zealand (RMNZ)	4× Platinum	120,000^{‡}
United Kingdom (BPI) 1984 release	Gold	500,000^{^}
United Kingdom (BPI) 2006 release	3× Platinum	1,800,000^{‡}
United States (RIAA)	Platinum	1,000,000^{^}
^{^} Shipments figures based on certification alone.^{‡} Sales+streaming figures based on certification alone.

== See also ==
- List of Billboard Hot 100 number-one singles of 1984
