= List of songs recorded by George Michael =

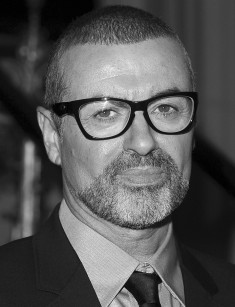
Michael at the Royal Opera House in 2011

English singer and songwriter George Michael had recorded songs for five studio albums, two compilation albums and one live album.

Following the break-up of the musical duo Wham! in June 1986, Michael began work on his debut solo studio album, Faith, having already recorded and released two solo singles during his tenure in the group – "Careless Whisper" (1984) and "A Different Corner" (1986) – both reaching number one on the UK Singles Chart upon release. Released in late 1987, Faith featured nine new songs written and produced by Michael (with the sole exception of "Look at Your Hands", co-written with and originally intended for singer David Austin, along with "I Want Your Sex"), and reached number one on the UK Albums Chart. The album spawned six singles, four of which ("Faith", "Father Figure", "One More Try" and "Monkey") have reached number one on the US Billboard Hot 100 chart.

In September 1990, Michael released his second solo studio album, Listen Without Prejudice Vol. 1, featuring nine original songs along with a cover version of "They Won't Go When I Go" – a song by Stevie Wonder from his seventeenth studio album, Fulfillingness' First Finale (1974). Following the hugely successful but gruelling Faith Tour, Michael decided to withdraw from extensive promotion and minimize his public appearance; as a result, he didn't appear on the album's artwork or in any of the singles' music videos ("Praying for Time", "Freedom! '90"). Despite that, Listen Without Prejudice managed to reach number one on the UK albums chart, and was certified 4× Platinum by the BPI.

In January 1991, Michael embarked on his second solo concert tour, the Cover to Cover tour, its set list mainly consisting of cover versions. "Don't Let the Sun Go Down on Me" – a duet with Elton John recorded live during the Wembley Arena concerts in March – was released internationally as a single in November, reaching number one on both sides of the Atlantic. A live recording of "Tonight" from the same concerts was featured on the tribute album Two Rooms: Celebrating the Songs of Elton John & Bernie Taupin, released in October that year. In 1992, Michael contributed three tracks ("Too Funky", "Happy" and "Do You Really Want to Know") to the charity album Red Hot + Dance. In April 1993, the Five Live EP was released, featuring live performances of "Calling You", "Killer" and "Papa Was a Rollin' Stone" from the 1991 concerts, as well as "Somebody to Love" and "These Are the Days of Our Lives", performed during the Freddie Mercury Tribute Concert on 20 April 1992.

In May 1996, Michael released his third studio album, Older. Featuring eleven new songs, Older reached number one on the UK albums chart, and spawned six consecutive top-three singles ("Jesus to a Child", "Fastlove", "Spinning the Wheel", "Older", "Star People '97" and "You Have Been Loved"). In November 1998, the greatest hits album Ladies & Gentlemen: The Best of George Michael was released, featuring three new tracks: "Outside", "A Moment with You" and "As" – a duet with American singer Mary J. Blige. In December 1999, Michael released his fourth studio album, Songs from the Last Century, consisting entirely of cover versions. "If I Told You That", a duet between Michael and Whitney Houston, was released in May 2000.

Michael's fifth studio album, Patience, was released in March 2004. Preceded by the singles "Freeek!" and "Shoot the Dog" in 2002, Patience featured fourteen new tracks, and was the final studio album released by Michael before his death on 25 December 2016. In November 2006, Michael's second compilation album, Twenty Five, was released, featuring the singles "An Easier Affair" and "This Is Not Real Love" – a duet with Mutya Buena. In 2009, Michael released the Christmas single "December Song (I Dreamed of Christmas)". In March 2011, the charity single "True Faith" was released, followed by "White Light" (2012), which was the last original song released by Michael before his death. In March 2014, the live album Symphonica was released, produced with Phil Ramone and recorded during Michael's Symphonica Tour between 2011–2012. In 2017 and 2019, the posthumous singles "Fantasy" and "This Is How (We Want You to Get High)" were released respectively.

== Songs ==
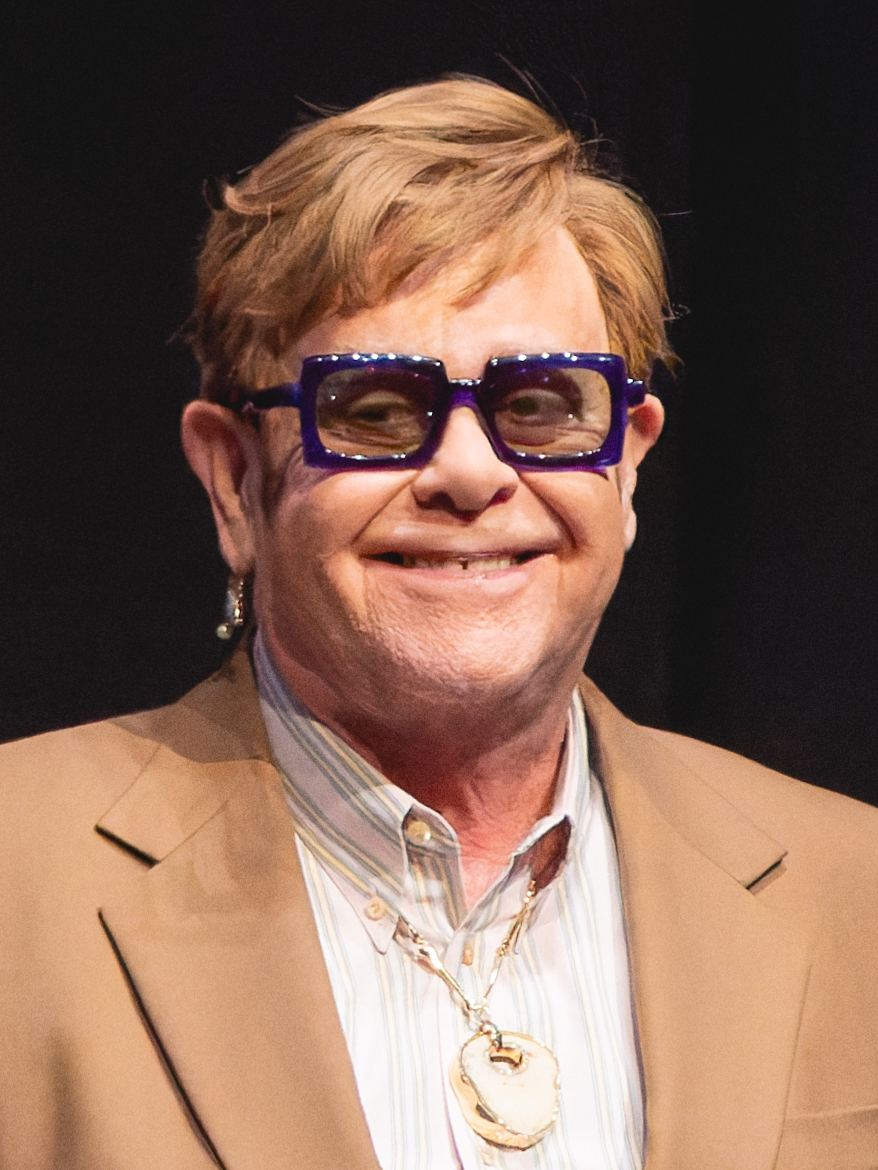
Michael has duetted with Elton John (pictured) on "Don't Let the Sun Go Down on Me".

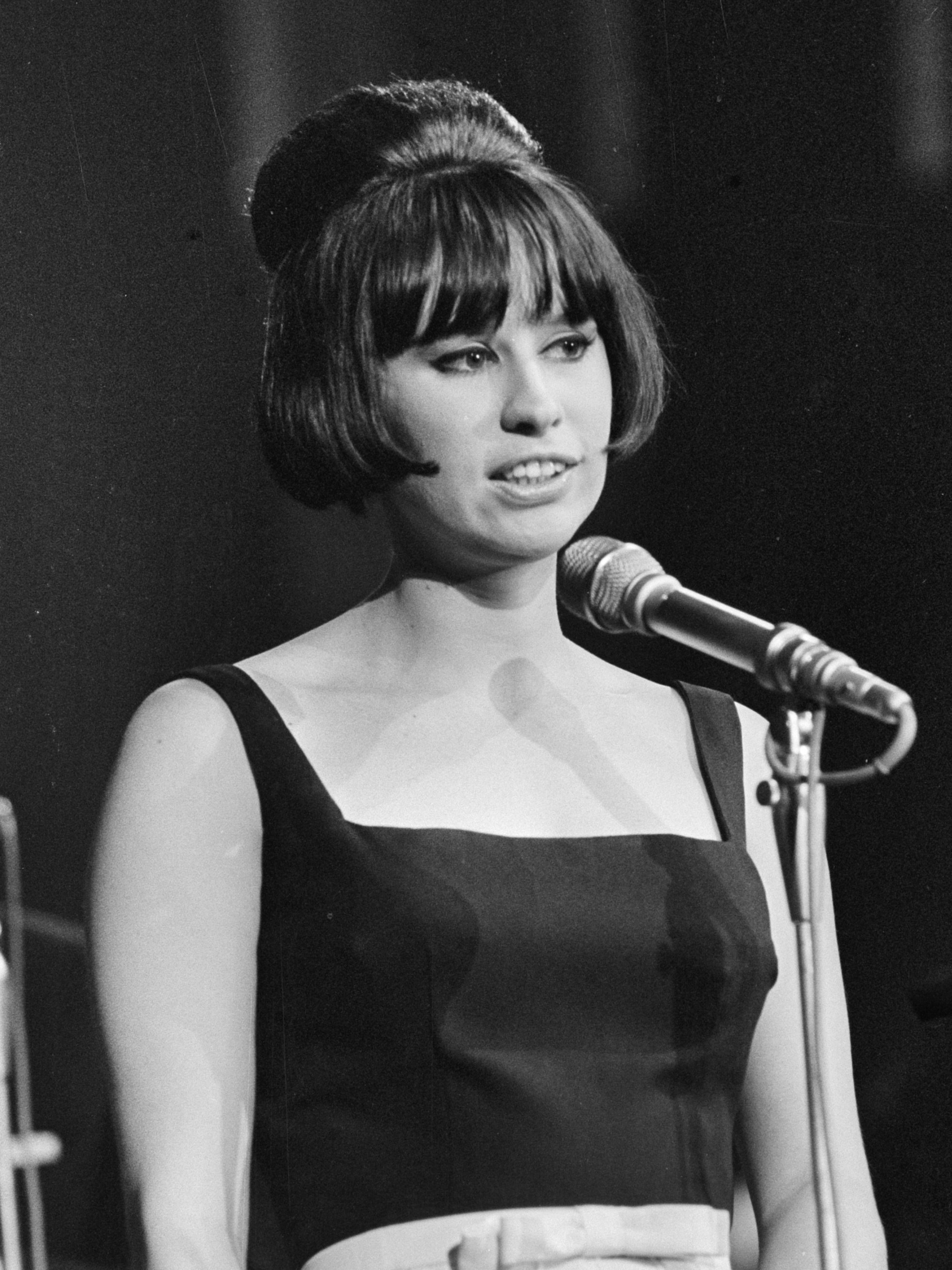
Astrud Gilberto (pictured in 1966) and Michael recorded a version of "Desafinado" for inclusion on the charity album Red Hot + Rio.

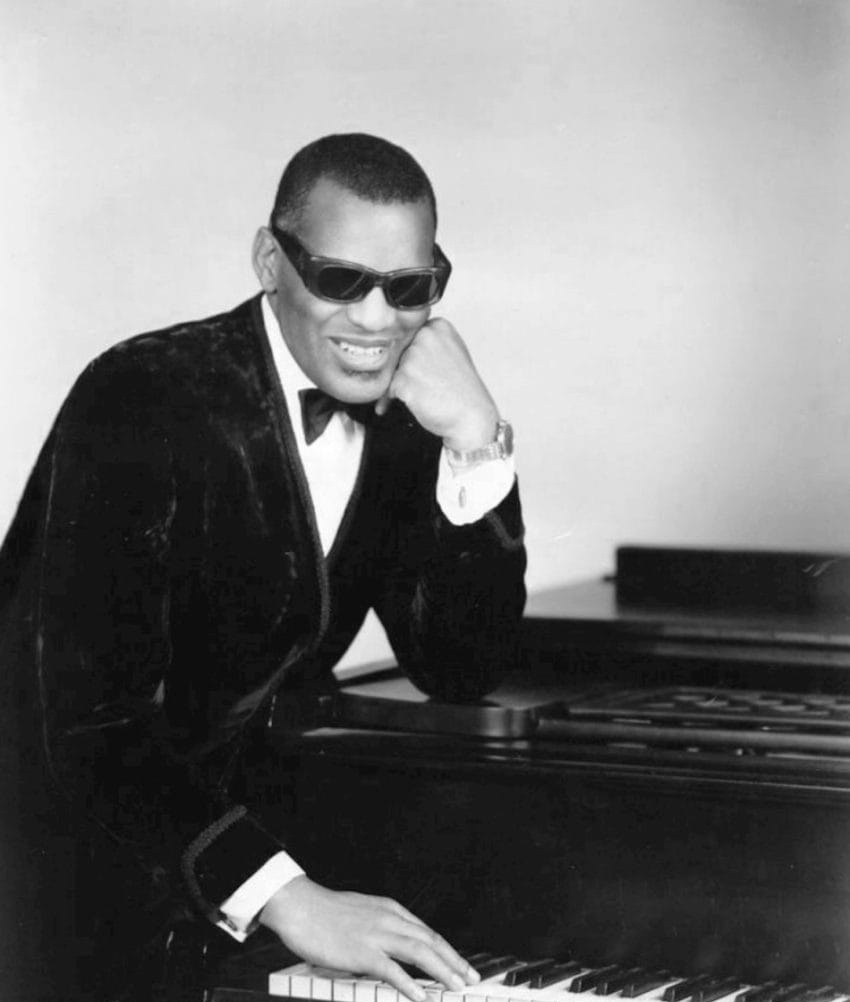
Michael has duetted with Ray Charles (pictured in 1969) on "Blame It on the Sun".

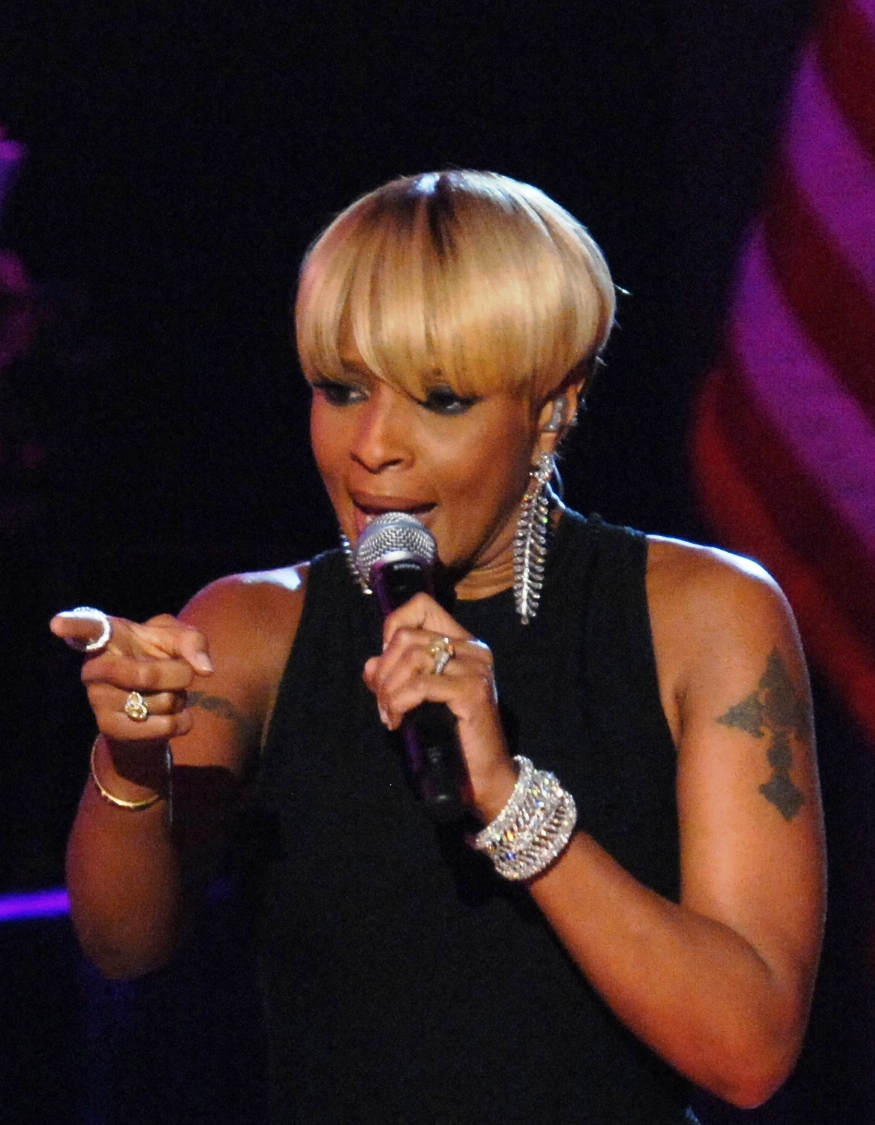
Mary J. Blige (pictured) has collaborated with Michael on "As".

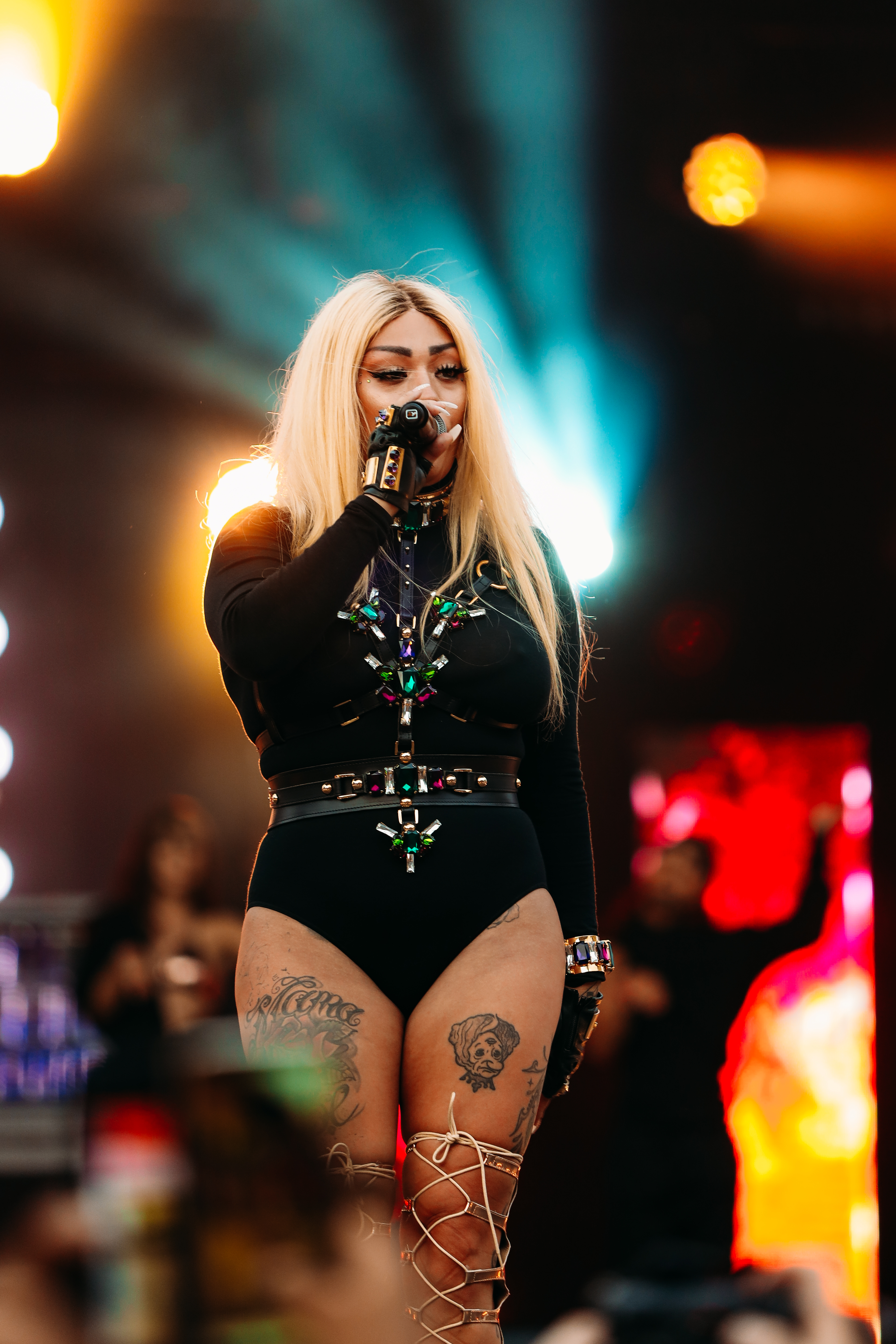
In 2006, Mutya Buena (pictured) duetted with Michael on "This Is Not Real Love".

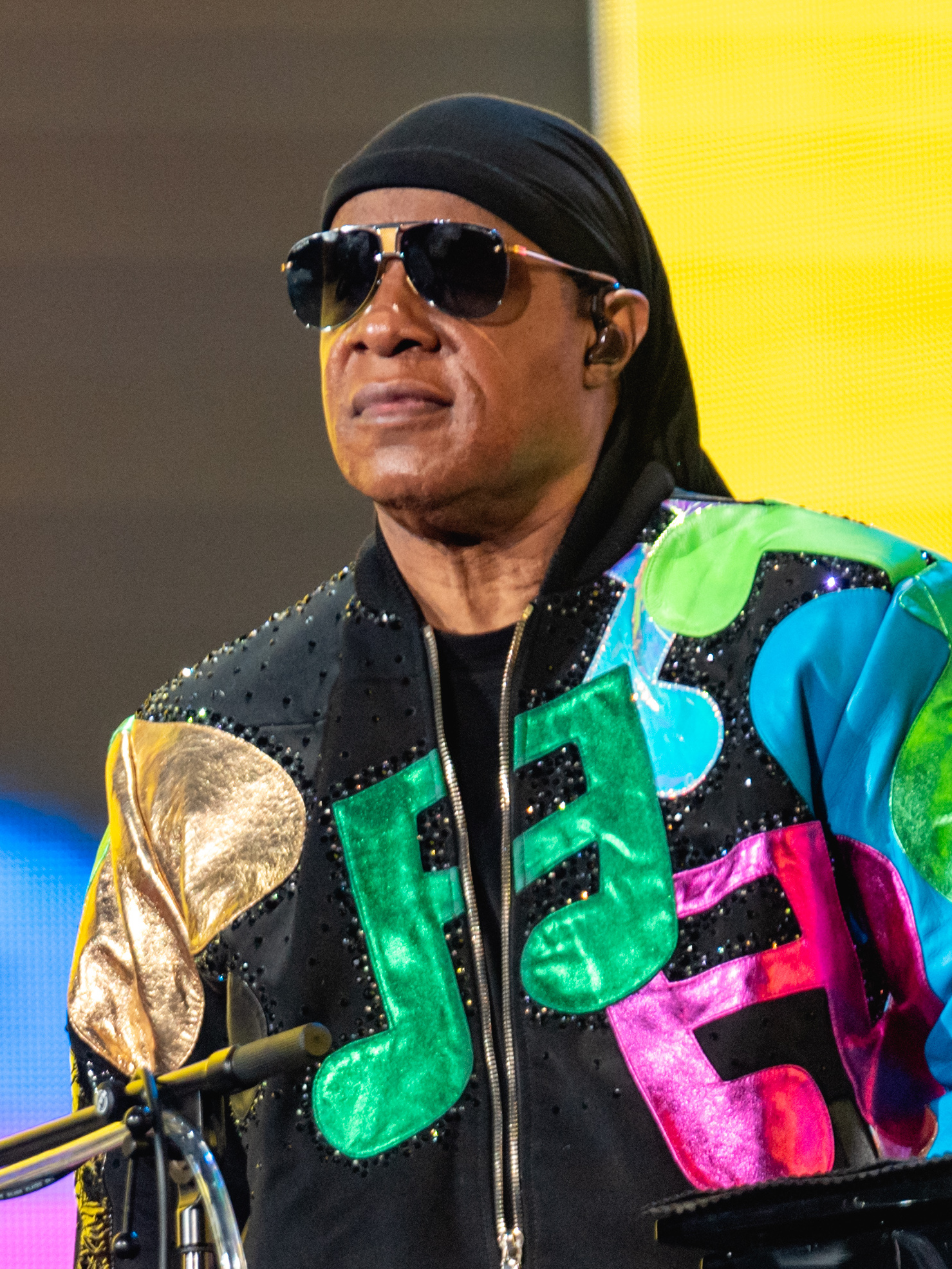
During his lifetime, Michael has performed and recorded cover versions of multiple songs written and performed by Stevie Wonder (pictured).

Key
‡	Indicates songs not written or co-written by George Michael

Name of song, writer(s), original release and year of release
Song	Writer(s)	Original release	Year	Ref.
"Amazing"	George Michael; Johnny Douglas	Patience	2004	
"American Angel"	George Michael; Niall Flynn; James Jackman; Ruadhri Cushnan	Patience	2004	
"As" (featuring Mary J. Blige)	Stevie Wonder ‡	Ladies & Gentlemen: The Best of George Michael	1998	
"Blame It on the Sun" (with Ray Charles)	Stevie Wonder; Syreeta Wright ‡	Genius & Friends	2005	
"Brother, Can You Spare a Dime?"	Jay Gorney; E.Y. Harburg ‡	Songs from the Last Century	1999	
"Calling You" (live)	Bob Telson ‡	Five Live	1993	
"Careless Whisper"	George Michael; Andrew Ridgeley	Make It Big	1984	
"Cars and Trains"	George Michael; Johnny Douglas	Patience	2004	
"Cowboys and Angels"	George Michael	Listen Without Prejudice Vol. 1	1990	
"Crazy Man Dance" (Note: Spelled as "Crazyman Dance" on some releases.)	George Michael	B-side of "Too Funky"	1992	
"December Song (I Dreamed of Christmas)"	George Michael; David Austin	Non-album single	2009 (Note: Originally available as a free download via Michael's official website on 25–26 December 2008.)	
"Desafinado" (with Astrud Gilberto)	Antônio Carlos Jobim; Newton Mendonça ‡	Red Hot + Rio	1996	
"A Different Corner"	George Michael	Music from the Edge of Heaven; The Final	1986	
"Do You Really Want to Know"	George Michael	Red Hot + Dance	1992	
"Don't Let the Sun Go Down on Me" (live) (with Elton John)	Elton John; Bernie Taupin ‡	Non-album single (Note: Later featured on John's 1993 album Duets.)	1991	
"An Easier Affair"	George Michael; Ruadhri Cushnan; Kevin Ambrose; Niall Flynn	Twenty Five	2006	
"Edith and the Kingpin"	Joni Mitchell ‡	John and Elvis Are Dead EP (Note: Later featured as a B-side on the "This Is Not Real Love" (2006) and "December Song (I Dreamed of Christmas)" (2009) singles.)	2005	
"Faith"	George Michael	Faith	1987	
"Fantasy"	George Michael	B-side of "Waiting for That Day" (UK); B-side of "Freedom! '90" (rest of world)	1990	
"Fastlove"	George Michael; Patrice Rushen; Freddie Washington; Terri McFaddin	Older	1996	
"Father Figure"	George Michael	Faith	1987	
"Feeling Good"	Anthony Newley; Leslie Bricusse ‡	Twenty Five (US edition)	2008	
"The First Time Ever I Saw Your Face"	Ewan MacColl ‡	Songs from the Last Century	1999	
"Flawless (Go to the City)"	George Michael; Paul Alexander; Nashom Wooden; Gary Turnier; Eric Matthew; Olivier Stumm	Patience	2004	
"For the Love (Of You)"	Ernie Isley; Marvin Isley; Rudolph Isley; O'Kelly Isley; Ronald Isley; Chris Jasper ‡	John and Elvis Are Dead EP	2005	
"Free"	George Michael	Older	1996	
"Freedom! '90"	George Michael	Listen Without Prejudice Vol. 1	1990	
"Freeek! '04"	George Michael; Niall Flynn; James Jackman; Ruadhri Cushnan	Patience	2004	
"Going to a Town" (live)	Rufus Wainwright ‡	Symphonica (deluxe edition)	2014	
"The Grave"	Don McLean ‡	Hope	2003	
"Hand to Mouth"	George Michael	Faith	1987	
"Happy"	George Michael	Red Hot + Dance	1992	
"Hard Day"	George Michael	Faith	1987	
"Heal the Pain"	George Michael	Listen Without Prejudice Vol. 1	1990	
"How Do You Keep the Music Playing?" (with Tony Bennett)	Michel Legrand; Alan Bergman; Marilyn Bergman ‡	Duets: An American Classic	2006	
"I Believe (When I Fall in Love It Will Be Forever)" (live)	Stevie Wonder; Yvonne Wright ‡	B-side of "Don't Let the Sun Go Down on Me"	1991	
"I Can't Make You Love Me"	Mike Reid; Allen Shamblin ‡	The Older E.P. (Note: Later featured on the album Ladies & Gentlemen: The Best of George Michael (1998).)	1997	
"I Knew You Were Waiting (For Me)" (with Aretha Franklin)	Simon Climie; Dennis Morgan ‡	Aretha	1986	
"I Remember You"	Victor Schertzinger; John H. Mercer ‡	Songs from the Last Century	1999	
"I Want Your Sex"	George Michael	Faith	1987	
"Idol" (live)	Elton John; Bernie Taupin ‡	Symphonica	2014	
"If I Told You That" (with Whitney Houston)	Rodney Jerkins; Fred Jerkins III; LaShawn Daniels; Toni Estes ‡	Whitney: The Greatest Hits	2000	
"If You Were My Woman" (live)	Clay McMurray; LaVerne Ware; Pam Sawyer ‡	B-side of "Praying for Time"	1990	
"It Doesn't Really Matter"	George Michael	Older	1996	
"It's Alright with Me" (instrumental)	Cole Porter ‡	Songs from the Last Century	1999	
"Jesus to a Child"	George Michael	Older	1996	
"Jingle (A Musical Interlewd)"	George Michael	B-side of "December Song (I Dreamed of Christmas)"	2009	
"John and Elvis Are Dead"	George Michael; David Austin	Patience	2004	
"Killer" (live)	Adamski; Seal ‡	Five Live	1993	
"Kissing a Fool"	George Michael	Faith	1987	
"Learn to Say No" (with Jody Watley)	Richard "Dimples" Fields; George Michael	Jody Watley	1987	
"Let Her Down Easy" (live)	Terence Trent D'Arby ‡	Symphonica	2014	
"The Long and Winding Road" (live)	John Lennon; Paul McCartney ‡	B-side of "Freeek!"	2002	
"Look at Your Hands"	George Michael; David Austin	Faith	1987	
"Love's in Need of Love Today" (live)	Stevie Wonder ‡	B-side of "Father Figure"	1987	
"Miss Sarajevo"	Paul Hewson; Dave Evans; Adam Clayton; Larry Mullen; Brian Eno ‡	Songs from the Last Century	1999	
"A Moment with You"	George Michael	Ladies & Gentlemen: The Best of George Michael	1998	
"Monkey"	George Michael	Faith	1987	
"Mother's Pride"	George Michael	Listen Without Prejudice Vol. 1	1990	
"Move On"	George Michael	Older	1996	
"My Baby Just Cares for Me"	Walter Donaldson; Gus Kahn ‡	Songs from the Last Century	1999	
"My Mother Had a Brother"	George Michael	Patience	2004	
"Older"	George Michael	Older	1996	
"One More Try"	George Michael	Faith	1987	
"Outside"	George Michael	Ladies & Gentlemen: The Best of George Michael	1998	
"Papa Was a Rollin' Stone" (live)	Norman Whitfield; Barrett Strong ‡	Five Live	1993	
"Patience"	George Michael	Patience	2004	
"Patience Pt. II"	George Michael	Patience	2004	
"Please Send Me Someone (Anselmo's Song)"	George Michael	Patience	2004	
"Praying for Time"	George Michael	Listen Without Prejudice Vol. 1	1990	
"Precious Box"	George Michael	Patience	2004	
"Round Here"	George Michael	Patience	2004	
"Roxanne"	Sting ‡	Songs from the Last Century	1999	
"Safe"	George Michael	The Spinning the Wheel E.P. (Note: Later featured on Older & Upper (1997).)	1996	
"Secret Love"	Sammy Fain; Paul Webster ‡	Songs from the Last Century	1999	
"Shoot the Dog"	George Michael	Patience	2004	
"Somebody to Love" (live) (with Queen)	Freddie Mercury ‡	Five Live	1993	
"Something to Save"	George Michael	Listen Without Prejudice Vol. 1	1990	
"Song to the Siren"	Tim Buckley; Larry Beckett ‡	B-side of "White Light"	2012	
"Soul Free"	George Michael	Listen Without Prejudice Vol. 1	1990	
"Spinning the Wheel"	George Michael; Johnny Douglas	Older	1996	
"Star People"	George Michael	Older	1996	
"The Strangest Thing"	George Michael	Older	1996	
"These Are the Days of Our Lives" (live) (with Queen and Lisa Stansfield)	Roger Taylor (Note: Credited simply to Queen in the liner notes.) ‡	Five Live	1993	
"They Won't Go When I Go"	Stevie Wonder; Yvonne Wright ‡	Listen Without Prejudice Vol. 1	1990	
"This Is How (We Want You to Get High)"	George Michael; James Jackman	Last Christmas: The Original Motion Picture Soundtrack	2019	
"This Is Not Real Love" (with Mutya)	George Michael; James Jackman; Ruadhri Cushnan	Twenty Five	2006	
"Through"	George Michael	Patience	2004	
"To Be Forgiven"	George Michael	Older	1996	
"Tonight" (live)	Elton John; Bernie Taupin ‡	Two Rooms: Celebrating the Songs of Elton John & Bernie Taupin	1991	
"Too Funky"	George Michael	Red Hot + Dance	1992	
"True Faith"	Peter Hook; Stephen Morris; Bernard Sumner; Gillian Gilbert; Stephen Hague ‡	Non-album single	2011	
"Understand"	George Michael	Twenty Five (deluxe edition)	2006	
"Waiting" (Reprise)	George Michael	Listen Without Prejudice Vol. 1	1990	
"Waiting for That Day"	George Michael; Mick Jagger; Keith Richards	Listen Without Prejudice Vol. 1	1990	
"Waltz Away Dreaming" (with Toby Bourke)	Toby Bourke; George Michael	Non-album single (Note: Later featured on Bourke's 2001 album Room 21.)	1997	
"Where or When"	Richard Rodgers; Lorenz Hart ‡	Songs from the Last Century	1999	
"White Light"	George Michael	Non-album single	2012	
"Wild Is the Wind"	Dimitri Tiomkin; Ned Washington ‡	Songs from the Last Century	1999	
"You and I"	Stevie Wonder ‡	Non-album single (Note: Available as a free download via Michael's official website on the occasion of the wedding of Prince William and Catherine Middleton in April 2011.)	2011	
"You Have Been Loved"	George Michael; David Austin	Older	1996	
"You Know That I Want To"	George Michael; Johnny Douglas	The Spinning the Wheel E.P.	1996	
"You've Changed"	Bill Carey; Carl Fischer ‡	Songs from the Last Century	1999	
