= Bombshell (soundtrack) =

Bombshell (Music from the Motion Picture)

Soundtrack album by Theodore Shapiro
- Released: December 13, 2019
- Recorded: 2019
- Genre: Film score
- Length: 46:47
- Label: Lionsgate Records
- Producer: Theodore Shapiro

Theodore Shapiro chronology
Last Christmas (2019)	Bombshell (2019)	Spies in Disguise (2019)

Singles from Bombshell (Music from the Motion Picture)
- 1. "One Little Soldier" Released: November 29, 2019

Bombshell (Music from the Motion Picture) is the film score to the 2019 film Bombshell directed by Jay Roach starring Charlize Theron, Nicole Kidman and Margot Robbie. The film score is composed by Theodore Shapiro and released under the Lionsgate Records label on December 13, 2019.

== Development ==
Theodore Shapiro who collaborated with Roach on Dinner for Schmucks (2010), The Campaign (2012) and Trumbo (2015), scored music for Bombshell. He and Roach discussed on finding Roger Ailes' voice in the music, where "[Ailes'] saw himself as a tough-minded realist — the only one brave enough to speak the truth about how the world really worked." They wanted to find a musical language reflecting Ailes' view coming with "dry, hard and percussive" scores that suited the tonality of the film. Shapiro went ahead with closed mic, deep percussions, staccato-tuned pianos, "very dry and in-your-face" strings and "harsh" string plucks. Shapiro also wrote for an unconventional ensemble consisting of brass, percussions and seven string ensembles. They brought three musicians from YMusic—Rob Moose, Nadia Sirota and Gabriel Cabezas for an improvisational session before recording the score, and their sound served as the final draft.

However, the film also followed the lives of Megyn Kelly and Gretchen Carlson accusing Ailes of sexual harassment and misconduct. Shapiro did not want to have music in the film, unless there was a need for it and tried to incorporate female vocals into the score wherever needed. Their conversations discussed about using two musical touchstones, with one being the New York-based Roomful of Teeth led by composer-vocalist Caroline Shaw, the other being the violinist-vocalist Petra Haden. Also, The Bangles frontman Susanna Hoffs, was selected as the third voice. Shapiro then conducted an improvisational session for Haden and Hoffs and had them "riff" on several ideas. He then edited their riffs into the score and composed it, and at the end of the process, Shaw came in and recorded final vocals. Shapiro and Roach were strategic on where the vocals should be used as it had a strong impact on the film.

Ultimately, they decided to use the vocals in the pivotal scene at the elevator where the three protagonists meet in their first and only time. Afterwards, the score progresses to reflect Kelly and Carson both finding their voices, resulting in a significant shift in the entire musical language, where the female choir played against the male musical language throughout the film, which was similar to the entrance of a new character signifying the shift; he noted "It is literally the point at which I think the movie goes from being dominated by Roger's power to a slightly different formulation of who's taking control of the story".

Shaw, the primary female vocalist, added that she had a personal relationship and feelings about Fox News. She added the idea of using detached vowels literally tapped into the idea of self-presentation, where the syllables can sound alternatively both robotic and detached, and also sound emotional. She said, "What's interesting about Teddy's score is that it wasn't about singing a song — it wasn't using the voice as you traditionally hear it but really as a very colorful, rich instrument that can bring a certain texture to the scene, but while having that really human quality" adding that these provided a confident but mysterious sound, but also becoming brash at a certain point.

== Release ==
Regina Spektor performed the song "One Little Soldier" for the feature film, which was released through Sire Records on November 29, 2019. The soundtrack was released through Lionsgate Records on December 13, the same day as the film's release.

== Track listing ==
No.	Title	Artist(s)	Length
1.	"One Little Soldier"	Regina Spektor	3:41
2.	"Clear and Simple"	Theodore Shapiro feat. Caroline Shaw, Petra Haden and Susanna Hoffs	2:43
3.	"Problems with Women"	Theodore Shapiro	1:05
4.	"Breaking"	Theodore Shapiro feat. Caroline Shaw, Petra Haden and Susanna Hoffs	2:32
5.	"The Tour"	Theodore Shapiro	2:16
6.	"Fox News Apologies"	Theodore Shapiro feat. Caroline Shaw, Petra Haden and Susanna Hoffs	2:13
7.	"Deposition"	Theodore Shapiro	4:13
8.	"The End Times"	Theodore Shapiro	1:29
9.	"Elevator Trio"	Theodore Shapiro feat. Caroline Shaw, Petra Haden and Susanna Hoffs	3:11
10.	"Chills and Fevers"	Theodore Shapiro	2:13
11.	"Accusers' Waltz"	Theodore Shapiro feat. Caroline Shaw	3:10
12.	"Roger Is Out"	Theodore Shapiro	2:31
13.	"Dressing Room"	Theodore Shapiro feat. Caroline Shaw, Petra Haden and Susanna Hoffs	1:54
14.	"Text Messages"	Theodore Shapiro	1:29
15.	"How Do I Play This"	Theodore Shapiro	1:05
16.	"Roger Roger Roger"	Theodore Shapiro	0:40
17.	"The Murdoch Boys"	Theodore Shapiro	1:57
18.	"The Questions"	Theodore Shapiro feat. Caroline Shaw, Petra Haden and Susanna Hoffs	2:25
19.	"Talking Points"	Theodore Shapiro feat. Caroline Shaw, Petra Haden and Susanna Hoffs	3:13
20.	"Explode"	Theodore Shapiro feat. Caroline Shaw	2:47
Total length:			46:47

== Reception ==
James Mottram of South China Morning Post called it a "nervy Philip Glass-like score". Owen Gleiberman of Variety and Todd McCarthy of The Hollywood Reporter called it "unnerving" and "thrilling". LATF USA News wrote "Theodore Shapiro's versatile score elicit[es] the storyline's full emotional scale."

== Accolades ==
Award	Category	Recipient	Result	Ref.
Guild of Music Supervisors Awards	Guild of Music Supervisors Award for Best Song Written and/or Recording Created for a Film	"One Little Soldier" – Regina Spektor	Won	
