= Spies in Disguise (soundtrack) =

2019 film soundtrack album

Film score by Theodore Shapiro
- Released: December 25, 2019
- Recorded: 2019
- Genre: Soundtrack
- Length: 73:03
- Labels: Hollywood Records, Fox Music, and RCA
- Producers: Theodore Shapiro and Mark Ronson

Theodore Shapiro chronology
Bombshell (2019)	Spies in Disguise (2019)	Trolls World Tour (2020)

Singles from Mark Ronson Presents the Music of Spies in Disguise
- 1. "Then There Were Two" Released: November 22, 2019; 2. "Fly" Released: December 2, 2019

Spies in Disguise (Original Motion Picture Soundtrack) is the soundtrack album composed by Theodore Shapiro for the film of the same name. The EP was released digitally on December 13, 2019, by RCA Records, before the film's score album was released by Hollywood Records and Fox Music on December 25, 2019.

== Development and release ==
On June 12, 2018, it was reported that Theodore Shapiro was set to compose the score to Spies in Disguise (2019). On June 11, 2019, it was announced that Mark Ronson would be the film's executive music producer. Head of Fox Music Danielle Diego expressed excitement at working with Ronson, stating that "his unique blend of vintage soul and funk exceptionally captures the soul of [the] film." On November 22, 2019, an original song for the film entitled "Then There Were Two", performed by Ronson and Anderson .Paak, was released. Two days later, an extended play album titled Mark Ronson Presents the Music of Spies in Disguise was announced, featuring five new songs written for the film as well as Rob Base & DJ E-Z Rock's "It Takes Two". The EP was released digitally on December 13, 2019, by RCA Records. The film's score album was released by Hollywood Records and Fox Music on December 25, 2019.

== Track listing ==
All music is composed by Theodore Shapiro.

No.	Title	Length
1.	"Defusing the Bomb"	0:35
2.	"Kiddie Glitter"	0:56
3.	"Walter's Promise"	1:25
4.	"Man, It's Cold!"	0:34
5.	"Joyless"	1:11
6.	"Killian, The Hand"	1:00
7.	"Killian Escapes"	1:34
8.	"Yakuza Fight"	0:56
9.	"Report to Langley"	2:06
10.	"Lance Meets Walter"	1:26
11.	"Invisible"	1:16
12.	"Lance Is Accused"	1:57
13.	"Lance Goes Rogue"	1:46
14.	"What's Your Play"	0:48
15.	"Test 83, Batch 5"	1:36
16.	"Epigenetic Modulation"	3:26
17.	"Unbird Me!"	2:33
18.	"High Speed Chase"	2:47
19.	"Walk on By"	0:40
20.	"Avian Instincts"	2:02
21.	"Kimura's Indoor Pool"	0:52
22.	"Sleepy Night-Night"	1:15
23.	"Going Science on Kimura"	1:36
24.	"Tic-Tac Jellyroll!"	1:33
25.	"Serious String"	1:07
26.	"Drone Factory Complete"	1:18
27.	"Arriving in Venice"	3:38
28.	"Drone Chase"	3:29
29.	"The Breadcrumb Defense"	3:18
30.	"Antidote Success"	3:06
31.	"Tux Redux"	1:21
32.	"Into Killian's Lair"	2:59
33.	"Killian in Control"	4:19
34.	"Let's Get Weird"	2:21
35.	"Next Gen Weaponry"	3:32
36.	"Lance Saves Walter"	4:39
37.	"Spies in Disguise"	1:59
38.	"Greasy Palms"	1:07
Total length:		73:03

=== Additional music ===
No.	Title	Artist(s)	Length
1.	"Freak of Nature"	Mark Ronson and The Last Artful, Dodgr	3:27
2.	"Then There Were Two"	Mark Ronson and Anderson Paak	2:32
3.	"Fly"	Lucky Daye	2:43
4.	"They Gotta Go"	Lil Jon	3:18
5.	"Rocket Fuel"	DJ Shadow featuring De La Soul	3:14
6.	"It Takes Two"	Rob Base & DJ E-Z Rock	5:00
Total length:			20:14

== Accolades ==
Award	Date of ceremony	Category	Recipient(s)	Result	Ref.
Annie Awards	January 25, 2020	Outstanding Achievement for Music in an Animated Feature Production	Mark Ronson, Theodore Shapiro	Nominated	
