= December Song (I Dreamed of Christmas) =

2009 single by George Michael

Single by George Michael
- B-side: "Jingle (A Musical Interlewd)"
- Released: 25 December 2008 (free release); 14 December 2009 (commercial release); 13 December 2010 (re-release); 12 December 2011 (re-release)
- Recorded: 2008 (free version); 2009 (commercial version)
- Genre: Pop; Christmas
- Length: 3:37
- Label: Island (2009–10); Aegean (2011)
- Songwriters: George Michael; David Austin
- Producer: George Michael

George Michael singles chronology
"Heal the Pain" (2008)	"December Song (I Dreamed of Christmas)" (2008)	"True Faith" (2011)

Music video
- "December Song (I Dreamed of Christmas)" on YouTube

"December Song (I Dreamed of Christmas)" is a Christmas single commercially released by English singer-songwriter George Michael on 14 December 2009. The song was originally announced during one of the last dates on Michael's 25 Live tour, and was available for free on Michael's official website on 25–26 December 2008. It was written by Michael and longtime writing partner David Austin.

During the Gerry Ryan show, Austin confirmed that the song had originally been written with the Spice Girls in mind. After a few failed deadlines, the song was going to be given to Michael Bublé, but Michael decided to keep it for himself.

The song features an intro and ending sample from the Frank Sinatra recording "The Christmas Waltz".

Michael performed the song live on 13 December for the final of the 2009 series of The X Factor. The day after the performance, physical copies of the song were sold out in one day, forcing Michael's record label to print new copies. The song debuted at number fourteen on the UK Singles Chart.

== Music video ==
The accompanying music video was Michael's second animated one, with 2002's "Shoot the Dog" being the first. The video features Michael as a boy, and it shows his view of Christmas from a child's perspective; shown by the visualization of sunshine, lightbulbs, and motherly love.

== Track listing ==
=== CD single-EP / digital single-EP ===
1. "December Song (I Dreamed of Christmas)" – 3:35
2. "Jingle (A Musical Interlewd)" – 3:35
3. "Edith & the Kingpin" (live at Abbey Road) – 3:46
4. "Praying for Time" (live at Abbey Road) – 4:57
5. "December Song (I Dreamed of Christmas)" (video) – 3:56 [A]
- [A] CD single only.

The first commercial release was in 2009, with two releases following in 2010 and 2011, the latter being the first to be released on iTunes (which excluded the video).

- The limited editions of the 2009 and 2010 CD releases included a Christmas card.

== Charts ==
Chart (2009)	Peak position
Austria (Ö3 Austria Top 40)	63
Belgium (Ultratip Bubbling Under Wallonia)	26
Europe (European Hot 100 Singles)	30
Germany (GfK)	37
Ireland (IRMA)	40
Netherlands (Single Top 100)	18
Scotland Singles (OCC)	23
Sweden (Sverigetopplistan)	43
UK Singles (OCC)	14
