= List of number-one singles of 2002 (Spain) =

This is a list of the Spanish Singles number-ones of 2002.

== Chart history ==
| Issue date | Song | Artist |
|---|---|---|
| 7 January | Abre Tu Sonrisa | Sugarless |
| 14 January | Star Guitar | The Chemical Brothers |
| 21 January | Star Guitar | The Chemical Brothers |
| 28 January | Get the Party Started | Pink |
| 4 February | Get the Party Started | Pink |
| 11 February | Baila (Sexy Thing) | Zucchero and Maná |
| 18 February | Duck Toy | Hampenberg |
| 25 February | Moi Lolita | Alizée |
| 4 March | Moi Lolita | Alizée |
| 11 March | Moi Lolita | Alizée |
| 18 March | Freeek! | George Michael |
| 25 March | Freeek! | George Michael |
| 1 April | Freeek! | George Michael |
| 8 April | Torero | Chayanne |
| 15 April | Torero | Chayanne |
| 22 April | Torero | Chayanne |
| 29 April | Torero | Chayanne |
| 6 May | Torero | Chayanne |
| 13 May | Aserejé | Las Ketchup |
| 20 May | Aserejé | Las Ketchup |
| 27 May | Aserejé | Las Ketchup |
| 3 June | Aserejé | Las Ketchup |
| 10 June | Don't Say Goodbye | Paulina Rubio |
| 17 June | Viva el Amor | Loona |
| 24 June | Aserejé | Las Ketchup |
| 1 July | Cruel to Be Kind | Naim Thomas |
| 8 July | Aserejé | Las Ketchup |
| 15 July | Aserejé | Las Ketchup |
| 22 July | Nadie Como Tú (Remixes) | Shalim |
| 29 July | Aserejé | Las Ketchup |
| 5 August | Ave María (Remixes) | David Bisbal |
| 12 August | Aserejé | Las Ketchup |
| 19 August | Aserejé | Las Ketchup |
| 26 August | Aserejé | Las Ketchup |
| 2 September | Chihuahua | DJ Bobo |
| 9 September | Everyday | Bon Jovi |
| 16 September | Everyday | Bon Jovi |
| 23 September | All The Things She Said | t.A.T.u. |
| 30 September | All The Things She Said | t.A.T.u. |
| 7 October | All The Things She Said | t.A.T.u. |
| 14 October | All The Things She Said | t.A.T.u. |
| 21 October | Electrical Storm | U2 |
| 28 October | Die Another Day | Madonna |
| 4 November | Die Another Day | Madonna |
| 11 November | Die Another Day | Madonna |
| 18 November | Die Another Day | Madonna |
| 25 November | Through The Rain | Mariah Carey |
| 2 December | No Quiero Sufrir | Cristie |
| 9 December | No Quiero Sufrir | Cristie |
| 16 December | Tú No Me Verás Llorar | Marey |
| 23 December | Tú No Me Verás Llorar | Marey |
| 30 December | Bésame | Danni Úbeda |

== See also ==
- 2002 in music
- List of number-one hits (Spain)
