= Amazing (George Michael song) =

2004 single by George Michael

Single by George Michael

from the album Patience
- B-side: "Freeek! '04"
- Released: 1 March 2004
- Length: 4:25
- Label: Aegean; Sony Music UK
- Songwriters: Jon Douglas; George Michael
- Producer: George Michael

George Michael singles chronology
"Shoot the Dog" (2002)	"Amazing" (2004)	"Flawless (Go to the City)" (2004)

Music video
- "Amazing" on YouTube

"Amazing" is a song co-written, produced, and performed by English singer-songwriter George Michael, released by Aegean and Sony Music on 1 March 2004. It was included on Michael's fifth studio album, Patience. The song is about and dedicated to Michael's then-partner, Kenny Goss. The song reached No. 1 in Hungary, Italy, Poland and Spain, as well as on three US Billboard dance charts.

== Critical reception ==
Stephen Thomas Erlewine from AllMusic chose the track as one of the album's track picks. BBC News Online's Michael Osborn said the song "sends us hurtling back to the late 80s". Sal Cinquemani called the song "catchy yet un-amazing".

On 26 December 2016, a day after Michael's death, Rolling Stone compiled a list of "20 Essential Songs" by Michael, and described "Amazing" as "a dancey soft-rock number".

== Chart performance ==
On 1 March 2004, "Amazing" was released in the United Kingdom. The song debuted at number four on the UK Singles Chart, selling 41,000 copies in its first week. Outside of the UK, the song was also successful. It reached number one in Spain, Italy, Poland and Hungary.

When Michael appeared on The Oprah Winfrey Show on 26 May 2004 to promote the album, he performed the song on the show. "Amazing" was released in the United States. Michael had previously found success in the dance clubs with "Monkey" (1988) and "Star People" (1997), and "Amazing" became his third release to reach the top on Billboard's Dance Club Play chart. It also topped the Dance Radio Airplay chart, staying at number one for four weeks.

== Music video ==
The song's music video (directed by Matthew Rolston) was filmed in London, in late 2003. It shows a modern club-like setting where a holographic performance by Michael is projected in front of a long lounge. He is also shown amongst the crowd, and in small intervals singing in front of a black background.

== Track listing ==
UK CD1

1. "Amazing" – 4:25
2. "Freeek! '04" – 4:28

UK CD2

1. "Amazing" (album version) – 4:25
2. "Amazing" (Jack 'n' Rory 7-inch vocal mix) – 5:56
3. "Amazing" (Full Intention club mix) – 8:05

== Charts ==
=== Weekly charts ===
Chart (2004)	Peak position
Australia (ARIA)	6
Austria (Ö3 Austria Top 40)	23
Belgium (Ultratop 50 Flanders)	23
Belgium (Ultratop 50 Wallonia)	34
Belgium Dance (Ultratop Flanders)	4
Canada (Nielsen SoundScan)	3
Canada AC Top 30 (Radio & Records)	2
Canada Hot AC Top 30 (Radio & Records)	5
Croatia International Airplay (HRT)	1
Czech Republic (IFPI)	5
Denmark (Tracklisten)	2
Europe (Eurochart Hot 100)	4
Finland (Suomen virallinen lista)	13
France (SNEP)	37
Germany (GfK)	19
Greece (IFPI Greece)	5
Hungary (Rádiós Top 40)	1
Hungary (Single Top 40)	2
Hungary (Dance Top 40)	12
Ireland (IRMA)	4
Italy (FIMI)	1
Netherlands (Dutch Top 40)	15
Netherlands (Single Top 100)	9
New Zealand (Recorded Music NZ)	30
Norway (VG-lista)	11
Poland (PiF PaF)	1
Romania (Romanian Top 100)	32
Scottish Singles Sales (Official Charts)	5
Spain (Promusicae)	1
Sweden (Sverigetopplistan)	16
Switzerland (Schweizer Hitparade)	10
UK Singles (Official Charts)	4
US Adult Pop Airplay (Billboard)	35
US Dance Airplay (Billboard)	1
US Dance Club Songs (Billboard) Full Intention and Jack 'n' Rory mixes	1
US Dance Singles Sales (Billboard) Full Intention and Jack 'n' Rory mixes	1
US Hot Singles Sales (Billboard)	8

Chart (2023)	Peak position
UK Singles Downloads (Official Charts)	56

=== Year-end charts ===
Chart (2004)	Position
Australia (ARIA)	79
Croatia International Airplay (HRT)	2
Hungary (Rádiós Top 40)	14
Italy (FIMI)	21
Netherlands (Dutch Top 40)	161
Netherlands (Single Top 100)	100
Spain (Promusicae)	12
Switzerland (Schweizer Hitparade)	81
UK Singles (OCC)	45
US Dance Club Play (Billboard)	37
US Dance Radio Airplay (Billboard)	18
US Dance Singles Sales (Billboard)	4

== Certifications and sales ==
Region	Certification	Certified units/sales
Australia (ARIA)	Gold	35,000^{^}
United Kingdom (BPI)	Silver	200,000^{‡}
^{^} Shipments figures based on certification alone.^{‡} Sales+streaming figures based on certification alone.

== Release history ==
Region	Date	Format(s)	Label(s)	Ref.
Australia	1 March 2004	CD	Aegean; Sony Music UK	
Denmark	1 March 2004	CD	Aegean; Sony Music UK	
United Kingdom	1 March 2004	12-inch vinyl; CD	Aegean; Sony Music UK	
United States	5 April 2004	Contemporary hit radio	Epic	
United States	8 June 2004	Hot adult contemporary radio	Epic	

== See also ==
- List of number-one dance airplay hits of 2004 (U.S.)
- List of number-one dance singles of 2004 (U.S.)
- List of number-one hits of 2004 (Italy)
- List of number-one singles of 2004 (Spain)
