= Patience (George Michael album) =

Studio album by George Michael
- Released: 15 March 2004
- Studios: AIR (London); Michael's home studio (Highgate)
- Genres: Pop; dance; soul
- Length: 70:15 (UK); 63:09 (US)
- Labels: Aegean; Sony; Epic
- Producer: George Michael

George Michael chronology
Songs from the Last Century (1999)	Patience (2004)	Twenty Five (2006)

Singles from Patience
- 1. "Freeek!" Released: 18 March 2002; 2. "Shoot the Dog" Released: 29 July 2002; 3. "Amazing" Released: 1 March 2004; 4. "Flawless (Go to the City)" Released: 28 June 2004; 5. "Round Here" Released: 1 November 2004 (UK); 6. "John and Elvis Are Dead" Released: 3 October 2005

Professional ratings
Aggregate scores
Source	Rating
Metacritic	(60/100)
Review scores
Source	Rating
AllMusic	3/5 stars
BBC Music	(positive)
Blender	3/5 stars
Entertainment Weekly	C
The Guardian	3/5 stars
Houston Chronicle	C
Slant Magazine	2.5/5 stars
Stylus Magazine	D+
Uncut	1/5 stars
Yahoo! Music UK	4/10 stars

Patience is the fifth and final solo studio album by the English singer-songwriter George Michael, released on 15 March 2004. The much delayed follow-up to Older, at the time of its release it was considered Michael's comeback album since it was his first album composed of original material since 1996, and his first for Sony Music since 1990's Listen Without Prejudice Vol. 1. Patience spawned six singles. The first two, "Freeek!" and "Shoot the Dog", were already released in 2002 by Polydor, when the album was originally due.

In a 2004 interview with Adam Mattera for British magazine Attitude, Michael explained how he felt reenergised and excited about the project: "There's something about the vocals on this album that's a lot more confident, more certain. There are proclamations of love that I've never made before – certainly since Wham! – and then there's going further into the truth at the same time, like on "My Mother Had a Brother" or "Through" – they're trying to get closer to the truth."

== Return to Sony ==
On 17 November 2003, Michael re-signed with Sony Music, the company he had left after a legal battle in which Michael claimed that his contract was stifling him and was keeping him in "professional slavery". As a result of the 1992 legal battle, his contract was sold by Sony to rival record companies Virgin Records and DreamWorks Records on 14 July 1995.

== Release and reception ==
Patience went on sale in most of the world in late March 2004 and debuted at number one on the UK Albums Chart, and at number 2 in Australia on 22 March. It became one of the fastest-selling albums in the UK, selling over 275,000 copies in the first week. The album went on sale in the US on 18 May 2004; however, it did not contain "Patience Pt. II" and "Shoot the Dog". It debuted in the US at number 29 but after TV appearances, such as The Oprah Winfrey Show, the following week, it reached its chart peak of number 12. As of 2006, the album had sold 381,000 in the United States. It has sold around four million copies worldwide.

The first single "Freeek!" had already reached number one in Italy, Spain and Denmark in March 2002 and reached the top ten in the UK and top five in Australia. The album features a slightly remixed version called "Freeek! '04".

The second single, "Shoot the Dog", was released in July 2002. It was not released as a single in Canada or the United States over sensitivity to the 11 September 2001 attacks and was not included on the Patience album in those countries. While it reached the top five in Spain, Italy and Denmark, it failed to reach the top ten in the UK.

The third single from Patience, "Amazing", was released in March 2004 and went to number one in Italy and Spain, also reaching number 4 in the UK and number 6 in Australia.

The fourth single, "Flawless (Go to the City)", was released in June 2004 and reached number 8 on the UK Singles Chart. It reached number one on Billboard's Hot Dance Club Songs chart.

In November 2004, Sony released a fifth single from Patience, "Round Here". The single reached number 32 on the UK charts.

"John and Elvis Are Dead", the sixth single, was released in October 2005 and only sold through the Internet as a download.

== Anti-war song ==
The album contains the anti-war song "Shoot the Dog". When released in July 2002, "Shoot the Dog" had already proved to be controversial. It was highly critical of George W. Bush and Tony Blair in the leadup to the 2003 invasion of Iraq. The video showed a cartoon version of Michael astride a nuclear missile in the Middle East and Tony and Cherie Blair in bed with President Bush. The latter image was apparently intended as a homage to the 1986 video for "Land of Confusion" by Genesis. The cartoon was produced by the makers of 2DTV, a satirical animated television show broadcast weekly on the independent television station ITV in the UK.

In an interview with MTV, Michael said the song was primarily intended to highlight what he saw as a lack of consultation by Tony Blair about the decision of invading Iraq. "People are looking at the song in context of an attack on America, as opposed to an attack on Tony Blair. And really, my attack is that Tony Blair is not involving the British in this issue. He's perfectly happy staying up to watch the World Cup and enjoying the Jubilee, all things I'm perfectly guilty of, but there's a serious discussion about Iraq, which hasn't taken place. We don't know what Saddam Hussein is capable of, the British public has no idea."

== Final album ==
Michael announced Patience would be his last album on sale to the public as a physical release as well as digital. He told BBC Radio 1 on 10 March 2004 that music he put out in the future would be available for download with fans encouraged to make a donation to charity. He said: "I've been very well remunerated for my talents over the years so I really don't need the public's money. I'd like to have something on the Internet which is a charitable download site where anyone can download my music for free. I'll have my favourite charities up there and people will hopefully donate to that." He stated that the decision would put less pressure to produce a new album every so often and allow him to have more of a private life.

Patience was Michael's final studio album of original material before his death on 25 December 2016.

== Track listing ==
All tracks are written and produced by George Michael, except where noted.

Standard version
No.	Title	Writer(s)	Producer(s)	Length
1.	"Patience"			2:53
2.	"Amazing"	Michael; Jon Douglas		4:25
3.	"John and Elvis Are Dead"	Michael; David Austin		4:23
4.	"Cars and Trains"	Michael; Douglas	Michael; Douglas^{[a]}	5:51
5.	"Round Here"			5:55
6.	"Shoot the Dog"	Michael; Philip Oakey		5:07
7.	"My Mother Had a Brother"			6:17
8.	"Flawless (Go to the City)"		Michael; A Touch of Class^{[b]}	6:51
9.	"American Angel"	Michael; Niall Flynn; James Jackman; Ruadhri Cushnan	Michael; Flynn; Jackman; Cushnan	4:07
10.	"Precious Box"			7:39
11.	"Please Send Me Someone (Anselmo's Song)"		Michael; Douglas^{[a]}	5:26
12.	"Freeek! '04"	Michael; Flynn; Jackman; Cushnan	Michael; Flynn; Jackman; Cushnan	4:28
13.	"Through"			5:22
14.	"Patience Pt. II"			1:30
Total length:				70:15

Japanese version (bonus track)
No.	Title	Length
15.	"Please Send Me Someone (Anselmo's Song)" (alternative version)	6:58

US version
No.	Title	Writer(s)	Producer(s)	Length
1.	"Patience"			2:53
2.	"Amazing"	Michael; Douglas		4:25
3.	"John and Elvis Are Dead"	Michael; Austin		4:23
4.	"Cars and Trains"	Michael; Douglas	Michael; Douglas^{[a]}	5:51
5.	"Round Here"			5:56
6.	"My Mother Had a Brother"			6:17
7.	"Flawless (Go to the City)"		Michael; A Touch of Glass^{[b]}	6:51
8.	"American Angel"	Michael; Flynn; Jackman; Cushnan	Michael; Flynn; Jackman; Cushnan	4:07
9.	"Precious Box"			7:39
10.	"Please Send Me Someone (Anselmo's Song)"		Michael; Douglas^{[a]}	5:26
11.	"Freeek! '04"	Michael; Flynn; Jackman; Cushnan	Michael; Flynn; Jackman; Cushnan	4:28
12.	"Through"			5:22

Notes

- ^a signifies an additional producer.
- ^b signifies original music producer.
- An alternative version of "Please Send Me Someone", the B-side to "Flawless (Go to the City)", appears only on Japanese pressings of the album.
- Had the 30 seconds of silence on "Through" not been included, the duration of the song would be 4:52.

Sample credits

- "Shoot the Dog" samples "Love Action (I Believe in Love)" by The Human League, written by Philip Oakey and Ian Burden.
- "Flawless (Go to the City)" contains elements from "Flawless" by The Ones, written by Paul Alexander, Olivier Stumm, Nashom Wooden, Eric Matthew, and Gary Turnier.
- "Please Send Me Someone (Anselmo's Song)" contains elements from "Moonraker" written and composed by John Barry and Hal David.
- "Freeek! '04" contains samples from "Try Again" by Aaliyah, written by Tim Mosley and Stephen Garrett; "Breathe and Stop" by Q-Tip, written by James Yancey and Kamaal Fareed; and "N.T." by Kool & the Gang, written by Gene Redd, Clarence Redd, Roy Handy, Cleveland Horne, Ronald Bell, Robert Mickens, Dennis Thomas, Richard Westfield, George Brown, and Claydes Smith.

== Personnel ==
Credits adapted from the album liner notes and AllMusic.

The A-Team

- George Michael – arranger, audio production, bass guitar, design, programming, guitar, keyboards, piano, primary artist, producer, lead vocals
- Jon Douglas – programming, keyboards, producer
- Niall Flynn – arranger, audio engineer, engineer, producer
- James Jackman – arranger, programming, keyboards, main personnel, photography, producer

Additional musicians

- Ruadhri Cushnan – arranger, keyboards, producer, programming
- Chris Cameron – piano
- Jo Bryant – backing vocals
- Pete Gleadall – additional keyboards, programming
- David Austin – keyboards, programming
- Phil Palmer – guitar on "American Angel"
- Michael Brown – guitar on "Amazing"
- Luke Smith – Wurlitzer organ
- Graham Silbiger – second bass guitar on "American Angel"
- David Arnold – additional orchestration on "Through"

Production

- Adam Noble – assistant engineer at AIR Studios
- Andy Davies – assistant engineer for tracks 6, 10 and 12
- Tony Cousins – mastering
- Tom Coyne – mastering
- Dan Gautreau – Pro Tools
- Joanna Bailey – direction
- Greg Jakobek – design
- James Dimmock – photography
- Abid Katib – photography
- Jack Panayiotou – photography
- Ben Smithard – photography
- Ellen von Unwerth – photography
- Eugene Adebari – photography

== Charts ==
=== Weekly charts ===
Chart (2004)	Peak position
Australian Albums (ARIA)	2
Austrian Albums (Ö3 Austria)	3
Belgian Albums (Ultratop Flanders)	5
Belgian Albums (Ultratop Wallonia)	4
Canadian Albums (Billboard)	4
Danish Albums (Hitlisten)	1
Dutch Albums (Album Top 100)	1
European Albums (Billboard)	1
Finnish Albums (Suomen virallinen lista)	3
French Albums (SNEP)	4
German Albums (Offizielle Top 100)	1
Greek Albums (IFPI Greece)	2
Hungarian Albums (MAHASZ)	2
Irish Albums (IRMA)	2
Italian Albums (FIMI)	1
Japanese Albums (Oricon)	26
New Zealand Albums (RMNZ)	2
Norwegian Albums (VG-lista)	11
Polish Albums (ZPAV)	1
Portuguese Albums (AFP)	5
Scottish Albums (Official Charts)	1
Spanish Albums (PROMUSICAE)	4
Swedish Albums (Sverigetopplistan)	1
Swiss Albums (Schweizer Hitparade)	2
UK Albums (Official Charts)	1
US Billboard 200	12

=== Monthly charts ===
Chart (2004)	Peak position
Russian Albums (NFPF)	8

=== Year-end charts ===
Chart (2004)	Position
Australian Albums (ARIA)	27
Austrian Albums (Ö3 Austria)	44
Belgian Albums (Ultratop Flanders)	34
Belgian Albums (Ultratop Wallonia)	35
Danish Albums (Hitlisten)	23
Dutch Albums (MegaCharts)	13
French Albums (SNEP)	84
German Albums (Offizielle Top 100)	27
Hungarian Albums (MAHASZ)	43
Swedish Albums (Sverigetopplistan)	76
Swiss Albums (Schweizer Hitparade)	25
UK Albums (OCC)	20
Worldwide Albums (IFPI)	38

== Certifications and sales ==
Region	Certification	Certified units/sales
Argentina (CAPIF)	Gold	20,000^{^}
Australia (ARIA)	Platinum	70,000^{^}
Austria (IFPI Austria)	Gold	15,000^{*}
Belgium (BRMA)	Gold	25,000^{*}
Denmark (IFPI Danmark)	Gold	20,000^{^}
France (SNEP)	Gold	121,000
Germany (BVMI)	Platinum	200,000^{^}
Hungary (MAHASZ)	Gold	10,000^{^}
Netherlands (NVPI)	Gold	40,000^{^}
New Zealand (RMNZ)	Platinum	15,000^{^}
Poland (ZPAV)	Gold	20,000^{*}
Spain (Promusicae)	Gold	50,000^{^}
Sweden (GLF)	Gold	30,000^{^}
Switzerland (IFPI Switzerland)	Gold	20,000^{^}
United Kingdom (BPI)	2× Platinum	700,000
United States	—	381,000
Summaries
Europe (IFPI)	Platinum	1,000,000^{*}
^{*} Sales figures based on certification alone.^{^} Shipments figures based on certification alone.
