= List of number-one hits of 2002 (Italy) =

This is a list of the number-one hits and albums of 2002 on Italian Charts.

Week	Issue date	Song	Artist	Album	Artist
1	4 January	"Somethin' Stupid"	Robbie Williams and Nicole Kidman	The Best of Laura Pausini: E ritorno da te	Laura Pausini
2	11 January	"Somethin' Stupid"	Robbie Williams and Nicole Kidman	Amorematico	Subsonica
3	18 January	"Salvami"	Jovanotti	The Best of Laura Pausini: E ritorno da te	Laura Pausini
4	25 January	"Whenever, Wherever"	Shakira	The Best of Laura Pausini: E ritorno da te	Laura Pausini
5	1 February	"Whenever, Wherever"	Shakira	Lorenzo 2002 – Il quinto mondo	Jovanotti
6	8 February	"Questa è la mia vita"	Ligabue	The Best of Laura Pausini: E ritorno da te	Laura Pausini
7	15 February	"Questa è la mia vita"	Ligabue	The Best of Laura Pausini: E ritorno da te	Laura Pausini
8	22 February	"Whenever, Wherever"	Shakira	Under Rug Swept	Alanis Morissette
9	1 March	"Questa è la mia vita"	Ligabue	Under Rug Swept	Alanis Morissette
10	8 March	"Whenever, Wherever"	Shakira	Uguali e diversi	Gianluca Grignani
11	15 March	"Freeek!"	George Michael	Uguali e diversi	Gianluca Grignani
12	22 March	"Whenever, Wherever"	Shakira	A New Day Has Come	Celine Dion
13	29 March	"Whenever, Wherever"	Shakira	Domani smetto	Articolo 31
14	5 April	"Whenever, Wherever"	Shakira	A New Day Has Come	Celine Dion
15	12 April	"The Hindu Times"	Oasis	A New Day Has Come	Celine Dion
16	19 April	"Innocente"	Renato Zero	Amore che prendi amore che dai	Nomadi
17	26 April	"Moi... Lolita"	Alizée	Fuori come va?	Ligabue
18	3 May	"Moi... Lolita"	Alizée	Fuori come va?	Ligabue
19	10 May	"Moi... Lolita"	Alizée	Fuori come va?	Ligabue
20	17 May	"Moi... Lolita"	Alizée	Fuori come va?	Ligabue
21	24 May	"Moi... Lolita"	Alizée	Fuori come va?	Ligabue
22	31 May	"Moi... Lolita"	Alizée	Fuori come va?	Ligabue
23	7 June	"Wherever You Will Go"	The Calling	The Eminem Show	Eminem
24	14 June	"Stop Crying Your Heart Out"	Oasis	The Eminem Show	Eminem
25	21 June	"By the Way"	Red Hot Chili Peppers	Greatest Hits - Le cose non vanno mai come credi	Giorgia
26	28 June	"Le vent nous portera"	Noir Désir	Greatest Hits - Le cose non vanno mai come credi	Giorgia
27	5 July	"Le vent nous portera"	Noir Désir	By the Way	Red Hot Chili Peppers
28	12 July	"Le vent nous portera"	Noir Désir	By the Way	Red Hot Chili Peppers
29	19 July	"Le vent nous portera"	Noir Désir	By the Way	Red Hot Chili Peppers
30	26 July	"The Ketchup Song"	Las Ketchup	The Rising	Bruce Springsteen
31	2 August	"The Ketchup Song"	Las Ketchup	The Rising	Bruce Springsteen
32	9 August	"The Ketchup Song"	Las Ketchup	By the Way	Red Hot Chili Peppers
33	16 August	"The Ketchup Song"	Las Ketchup	By the Way	Red Hot Chili Peppers
34	23 August	"The Ketchup Song"	Las Ketchup	A Rush of Blood to the Head	Coldplay
35	30 August	"The Ketchup Song"	Las Ketchup	Fleurs 3	Franco Battiato
36	6 September	"The Ketchup Song"	Las Ketchup	Fleurs 3	Franco Battiato
37	13 September	"The Ketchup Song"	Las Ketchup	Uno come te	Gigi D'Alessio
38	20 September	"All the Things She Said"	t.A.T.u.	Up	Peter Gabriel
39	27 September	"All the Things She Said"	t.A.T.u.	Uno come te	Gigi D'Alessio
40	4 October	"All the Things She Said"	t.A.T.u.	Forty Licks	The Rolling Stones
41	11 October	"All the Things She Said"	t.A.T.u.	U.D.S. - L'uomo della strada	Piero Pelù
42	18 October	"Electrical Storm"	U2	Shaman	Santana
43	25 October	"Die Another Day"	Madonna	L'eccezione	Carmen Consoli
44	1 November	"Die Another Day"	Madonna	The Best of 1990–2000	U2
45	8 November	"Die Another Day"	Madonna	The Best of 1990–2000	U2
46	15 November	"Die Another Day"	Madonna	Per sempre	Adriano Celentano
47	22 November	"Die Another Day"	Madonna	Tracks	Vasco Rossi
48	29 November	"Per me è importante"	Tiromancino	Tracks	Vasco Rossi
49	5 December	"Per me è importante"	Tiromancino	Tracks	Vasco Rossi
50	6 December	"Lose Yourself"	Eminem	Tracks	Vasco Rossi
51	13 December	"Per me è importante"	Tiromancino	Tracks	Vasco Rossi
52	20 December	"Feel"	Robbie Williams	Tracks	Vasco Rossi
53	27 December	"Feel"	Robbie Williams	Tracks	Vasco Rossi

== See also ==
- 2002 in music
- List of number-one hits in Italy
