= Electrical Storm (song) =

2002 single by U2

Single by U2

from the album The Best of 1990–2000
- B-side: "New York" (Nice mix); "Electrical Storm" (band version)
- Released: 21 October 2002
- Genre: Rock
- Length: 4:37 (William Orbit mix); 4:26 (band version)
- Label: Island; Interscope
- Composer: U2
- Lyricist: Bono
- Producer: William Orbit

U2 singles chronology
"Walk On" (2001)	"Electrical Storm" (2002)	"Take Me to the Clouds Above" (2004)

Music video
- "Electrical Storm" on YouTube

"Electrical Storm" is a song by Irish rock band U2. It is the fourth track on their second greatest hits compilation album, The Best of 1990–2000, and was released as a single on 21 October 2002. "Electrical Storm" is one of two new songs that were recorded for the compilation (the other one being "The Hands That Built America"). Two versions of the song were released: the "Band Version", produced by William Orbit and mixed by Carl Glanville and the "William Orbit Mix", both produced and mixed by Orbit. The music video for the song prominently features drummer Larry Mullen Jr. and actress Samantha Morton. The lyrics were written by the band's frontman and lead vocalist Bono about two quarreling lovers and the tension between them; he relates this to a looming electrical storm. U2 did not perform the song live until 2 July 2009, on the second concert of their U2 360° Tour in Barcelona, Spain.

"Electrical Storm" reached number one in Canada, Italy, and Spain, and it peaked within the top 10 in 14 other countries, including Ireland and the United Kingdom, reaching numbers two and five, respectively. Although the song did not chart well on the US Billboard Hot 100, reaching number 77, it entered the top 20 of the Adult Top 40 and Modern Rock Tracks charts and peaked at number one on the Triple-A ranking for six weeks.

== Composition ==
Two official versions of the song exist – the "Band Version" mixed by Carl Glanville, and the "William Orbit Mix" mixed by William Orbit and featuring a much quieter intro. The "William Orbit Mix" appeared on The Best of 1990–2000 and the "Band Version" was featured on the B-sides disc of the album.

Shortly before the official release of the single, a third version of the song was broadcast on radio stations in the United Kingdom, Australia and Latin America. Unofficially called the "Radio One Mix" (because it was originally played on BBC Radio 1, and in the middle of the song said station's call sign is heard), this version is a very-mellow sounding mix, with different guitar lines during the chorus and traditional U2 "chiming" riff at the start of the guitar solo towards the end of the song. It is believed this was a demo version that was leaked to radio.

== Live performances ==
The song was rehearsed during the Vertigo Tour, but did not make it to a full show until the U2 360° Tour when it was played in the William Orbit style during the tour's second night in Barcelona, Spain on 2 July 2009. It was subsequently played twice more: on 8 July 2009 in Milan, Italy and on 1 August 2009 in Gothenburg, Sweden.

== Formats and track listings ==
CD 1 (063 909-2)
No.	Title	Mixed by	Length
1.	"Electrical Storm" (William Orbit mix)	William Orbit	4:37
2.	"New York" (Nice mix)	Jimmy "KLF" Cauty	5:43
3.	"New York" (Nasty mix)	Jimmy "KLF" Cauty	5:00

CD 2 (063 910-2)
No.	Title	Mixed by	Length
1.	"Electrical Storm" (band version)	Carl Glanville	4:26
2.	"Bad/"40"/Where the Streets Have No Name" (live at the Fleet Center, Boston, Massachusetts, June 2001)	John Harris and Steve Lillywhite	12:28

CD 3 (603 886-2)
No.	Title	Mixed by	Length
1.	"Electrical Storm" (William Orbit mix)	William Orbit	4:37
2.	"Electrical Storm" (band version)	Carl Glanville	4:26

Japan CD (UICI-5009)
No.	Title	Mixed by	Length
1.	"Electrical Storm" (William Orbit mix)	William Orbit	4:37
2.	"New York" (Nice mix)	Jimmy "KLF" Cauty	5:43
3.	"New York" (Nasty mix)	Jimmy "KLF" Cauty	5:00
4.	"Electrical Storm" (band version)	Carl Glanville	4:26
5.	"Bad/"40"/Where the Streets Have No Name" (live at the Fleet Center, Boston, June 2001)	John Harris and Steve Lillywhite	12:28

DVD (063 857-9)
No.	Title	Length
1.	"Electrical Storm" (William Orbit mix)	4:37
2.	"Electrical Storm" (director's cut video)	4:25
3.	"Video Interview with Larry"
4.	"Photo Gallery" (Anton Corbijn photographs)

== Personnel ==
- Bono – lead vocals, guitar
- The Edge – guitar, backing vocals, keyboards
- Adam Clayton – bass guitar
- Larry Mullen Jr. – drums

== Charts ==
=== Weekly charts ===
Weekly chart performance for "Electrical Storm"
Chart (2002)	Peak position
Australia (ARIA)	5
Austria (Ö3 Austria Top 40)	8
Belgium (Ultratop 50 Flanders)	23
Belgium (Ultratop 50 Wallonia)	29
Canada (Nielsen SoundScan)	1
Canada CHR (Nielsen BDS)	14
Croatia (HRT)	6
Denmark (Tracklisten)	2
Europe (Eurochart Hot 100)	3
Finland (Suomen virallinen lista)	2
France (SNEP)	18
Germany (GfK)	8
Greece (IFPI)	10
Hungary (Single Top 40)	6
Ireland (IRMA)	2
Italy (FIMI)	1
Netherlands (Dutch Top 40)	4
Netherlands (Single Top 100)	4
New Zealand (Recorded Music NZ)	5
Norway (VG-lista)	4
Portugal (AFP)	1
Romania (Romanian Top 100)	29
Scottish Singles Sales (Official Charts)	3
Spain (Promusicae)	1
Sweden (Sverigetopplistan)	13
Switzerland (Schweizer Hitparade)	5
UK Singles (Official Charts)	5
US Billboard Hot 100	77
US Adult Alternative Airplay (Billboard)	1
US Adult Pop Airplay (Billboard)	18
US Alternative Airplay (Billboard)	14
US Mainstream Rock (Billboard)	26

=== Year-end charts ===
Year-end chart performance for "Electrical Storm"
Chart (2002)	Position
Canada (Nielsen SoundScan) Parts 1 and 2	3
Canada (Nielsen SoundScan)	26
Canada Radio (Nielsen BDS)	48
Ireland (IRMA)	37
Italy (FIMI)	10
Netherlands (Dutch Top 40)	90
Netherlands (Single Top 100)	73
Spain (AFYVE)	10
Switzerland (Schweizer Hitparade)	86
UK Singles (OCC)	107
US Adult Top 40 (Billboard)	74
US Triple-A (Billboard)	17

== Release history ==
Release dates and formats for "Electrical Storm"
Region	Date	Format(s)	Label(s)	Ref.
Australia	21 October 2002	CD	Island	
United Kingdom	21 October 2002	CD; DVD	Island	
Canada	22 October 2002	CD; DVD	Island	
Japan	23 October 2002	CD	Island	

== See also ==
- List of number-one singles of 2002 (Canada)
- List of number-one hits of 2002 (Italy)
- List of number-one singles of 2002 (Spain)
