= Die Another Day (song) =

Theme from 2002 James Bond film Die Another Day / 2002 single by Madonna

Single by Madonna

from the album Die Another Day
- Released: October 22, 2002
- Recorded: 2002
- Studio: AIR Lyndhurst Studios (London)
- Genre: Electroclash; dance-pop
- Length: 4:38
- Label: Warner Bros.
- Songwriters: Madonna; Michel Colombier; Mirwais Ahmadzaï
- Producers: Madonna; Mirwais Ahmadzaï

Madonna singles chronology
"What It Feels Like for a Girl" (2001)	"Die Another Day" (2002)	"American Life" (2003)

James Bond theme singles chronology
"The World Is Not Enough" (1999)	"Die Another Day" (2002)	"You Know My Name" (2006)

Music video
- "Die Another Day" on YouTube

"Die Another Day" is a song by American singer Madonna, recorded as the theme for the 2002 James Bond film of the same name. Following the lukewarm commercial performance of Garbage's "The World Is Not Enough" (1999), Metro-Goldwyn-Mayer (MGM) Pictures sought a globally recognized artist for the franchise's next theme. Madonna, one of the most prominent figures in pop music, was selected as their top choice. She co-wrote and co-produced the track with Mirwais Ahmadzaï, with additional composition by Michel Colombier. Musically, "Die Another Day" blends electroclash and dance music with orchestral strings, and features lyrics exploring psychological themes such as ego destruction, including a reference to Sigmund Freud. The song plays during the film's opening sequence, in which James Bond—portrayed by Pierce Brosnan—is tortured in North Korea.

After an early leak in late September, "Die Another Day" was officially released in the United States on October 22, 2002, and in most European markets six days later. It was added to Madonna's ninth studio album, American Life (2003), and included on her compilation albums Celebration (2009) and Finally Enough Love: 50 Number Ones (2022). Upon release, critical reception was mixed to negative, with some reviewers ranking it among the weaker entries in the Bond theme catalogue. Nonetheless, the song received nominations for the Golden Globe Award for Best Original Song and two Grammy Awards: Best Dance Recording and Best Short Form Music Video.

Commercially, "Die Another Day" proved successful. In the United States, it peaked at number eight on the Billboard Hot 100—making it the first Bond theme to reach the chart's top ten since 1985—and was the best-selling dance single of both 2002 and 2003. It reached number one in Canada, Italy, and Spain, and entered the top ten in several other countries, including a peak at number three in the United Kingdom. The accompanying music video, directed by Swedish collective Traktor, features Madonna in Bond-inspired scenes, including a torture chamber and a fencing duel with her doppelgänger. With a production cost of $6.1 million ($10.92 million in 2025 dollars), it is the second most expensive video ever made. Its use of Jewish symbolism attracted controversy from some religious scholars. Madonna performed "Die Another Day" live on her Re-Invention (2004) and Celebration (2023–2024) concert tours, while a remixed version was used a video interlude on 2008―2009's Sticky & Sweet Tour.

== Background and development ==
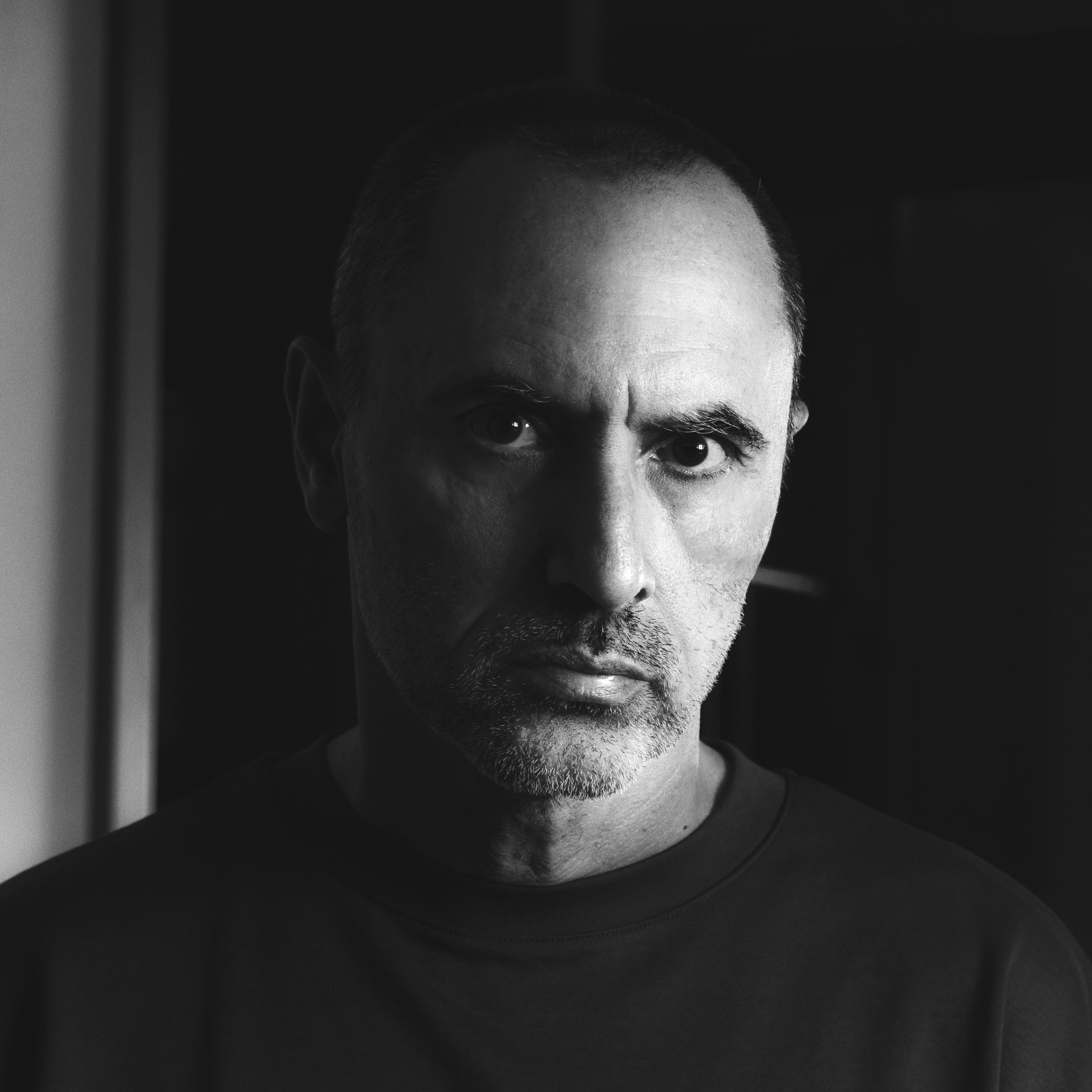
Mirwais Ahmadzaï co-wrote and co-produced "Die Another Day" alongside Madonna.

In wake of the September 11 attacks, Madonna and producer Mirwais Ahmadzaï had begun work on her ninth studio album, American Life (2003). Their recording sessions were briefly paused as the singer took on acting roles in the film Swept Away (2002)—directed by her then-husband Guy Ritchie—and in the West End play Up For Grabs. Around this time, Metro-Goldwyn-Mayer (MGM) Pictures was developing the twentieth James Bond film, Die Another Day (2002). Although the franchise's previous entry, The World Is Not Enough (1999), was a commercial success, grossing US$362 million worldwide, its eponymous theme song by alternative rock band Garbage underperformed in the United States. Seeking a more high-profile artist, MGM turned to Madonna, whose 1999 single "Beautiful Stranger"—recorded for Austin Powers: The Spy Who Shagged Me—had been a commercial hit and earned a Grammy Award for Best Song Written for Visual Media.

By early 2002, reports surfaced that Madonna was in talks to write and perform Die Another Day's theme song and possibly make a cameo appearance. She confirmed her involvement in a March interview on Larry King Live, where she explained her unconventional approach: "Everybody wants to do the theme song of a James Bond movie, and I never liked to do what everybody else likes to do. [...] I thought about it and I said, you know what? James Bond needs to get techno". The song originated from a demo with electronica influences Madonna and Ahmadzaï created during the American Life sessions. Initially met with skepticism by MGM executives and director Lee Tamahori—who was not convinced with its "stops and starts" and felt lacked emotional resonance—Madonna reworked the track after viewing a rough cut of the film. She eventually renamed it "Die Another Day", a change that helped secure the studio's approval. According to producer Michael G. Wilson, the song went through "various interpolations" before reaching its final form. Madonna's cameo was confirmed on July. She was cast as Verity, a fencing instructor she described as the only woman not interested in Bond.

== Recording and composition ==
"Die Another Day"
20-second audio sample of "Die Another Day". It features Madonna chanting "I guess I'll die another day" over electroclash beats and atmospheric strings. The first refrain ends with a pointed nod to Austrian neurologist Sigmund Freud.

To merge the electronic production crafted by Madonna and Ahmadzaï with the orchestral tradition expected of a James Bond theme, French composer Michel Colombier was enlisted to add "cinematic" strings. Recorded with a 60-piece ensemble at AIR Lyndhurst Studios, Colombier's arrangements were later digitally deconstructed by Ahmadzaï, who adopted a minimalist, futuristic approach aligned with his ongoing work on American Life. The result was a hybrid of glitchy beats and live instrumentation, described by Colombier as "completely Mirwais"—a manipulation of real strings into audio fragments "chopped like fabric".

Lyrically, Madonna took a psychological angle on the Bond trope of good versus evil, framing the conflict as an internal battle. "It's about destroying your ego," she explained, adding that the lyrics were a metaphor for "fighting myself." Departing from past Bond songs, "Die Another Day" omits references to the titular character, instead invoking Austrian neurologist Sigmund Freud and his theory of the death drive in lines like: "Sigmund Freud, analyze this / I'm gonna keep this secret / I'm gonna delay my pleasure / I'm gonna destroy my ego."

Musically, the song has been noted a "pounding" electroclash dance track composed in C minor, set at 124 beats per minute. (Note: Per multiple sources) Its autotuned vocals and fragmented production recall earlier Madonna singles such as "Everybody" (1982) and "Music" (2000), while the orchestral opening nods to "Papa Don't Preach" (1986). Critics noted the track's experimental nature, with The Village Voice likening its dissonant finale to the microhouse genre—a "cacophony of harmonic fragments". Madonna later called it one of her favorite songs for its "cinematic" atmosphere, its "chilling" strings, and the opportunity to work with a live orchestra.

== Usage on Die Another Day and release ==
"Die Another Day" plays over the film's opening sequence, in which James Bond (Pierce Brosnan) is shown imprisoned and tortured in a North Korean military facility. Anita Camrata, executive vice president of MGM Music, remarked that the song "nailed" the essence of the scene and helped "set up the story." Its early placement in the film also allowed composer David Arnold to focus more fully on the overall score. However, longtime Bond title sequence designer Daniel Kleinman later admitted he was not fond of the choice: "If I had a decision about which music track would have gone with [that sequence], I probably wouldn't have chosen that particular song."

In the United States, the physical single of "Die Another Day" was released on October 22, 2002. It was originally scheduled for October 10, but was leaked ten days earlier to a New York radio station. According to website Hollywood.com, Madonna and her team were reportedly "beside themselves" over the premature leak. The single was released in most European countries on October 28. (Note: See sources cited on "Weekly charts" section) It was later added to American Life, and included on Madonna's compilation albums Celebration (2009) and Finally Enough Love: 50 Number Ones (2022), the latter featuring a remix by Deepsky. Additional official remixes were produced by Deepsky, Victor Calderone, Dirty Vegas and Thunderpuss.

== Critical reception and recognition ==
Upon release, "Die Another Day" received mixed to negative reviews and has often been cited as one of the weakest entries in the Bond theme song canon. Criticism was given to its heavy use of Auto-Tune, perceived lack of melody and detachment from the Bond aesthetic. (Note: Attributed to multiple references) Positive feedback came from Entertainment Weekly's Craig Seymour, who praised its "dance-floor urgency" and self-referential lyrics. James Hannaham, writing for Spin magazine, was also favorable, calling it a brilliant, melodramatic piece. Others, however, were far less impressed: Billboard referred to it as "disjointed" and "nonsensical", while Rikky Rooksby—author of The Complete Guide to the Music of Madonna—criticized its "repetitive" melody and claimed it marked a decline in Bond songwriting. Additional reviewers dismissed the song as "cheerless", "half-dead", and "rubbish".

Despite its initial reception, retrospective opinions have grown more favorable. In a 2006 MORI poll for the Channel 4 program James Bond's Greatest Hits, "Die Another Day" ranked 9th among 22 Bond themes and was the overwhelming favorite among respondents under 24. The Daily Telegraph later hailed it as "brutally modern" and "evocative of the dark heart of Bond", while Vogue magazine celebrated its bold break from ballad tradition, calling it "hilariously early-naughts sounding" yet still "one of the greats". Critics like Samuel Murrian, Jon O'Brien, and Matthew Jacobs acknowledged it as a divissive "weird fit" for Bond, but praised its role in modernizing the franchise's sound. Music historian Jon Burlingame deemed it the "most sonically edgy" Bond theme, and author Daryl Easlea highlighted its "poignancy" and "experimental darkness". According to biographer Mary Gabriel, much of the backlash was likely amplified by Madonna's role in the critically panned Swept Away, with music critics "feeling obligated" to dislike the song. In 2009, Freaky Trigger reviewer Tom Ewing named it Madonna's most radical 2000s single, as well as "one of her most divisive", opining that although James Bond 'purists' disliked "its lurching, patchwork aggression", it had aged well. "At the time the main reference point seemed to be Akufen", Ewing writes, "[which] gives you an idea of how odd, even in the surprise-rich charts of the time, this record sounded."

Although critically divisive, "Die Another Day" still garnered notable award recognition. It was nominated for Best Original Song at the 60th Golden Globe Awards, but lost to U2's "The Hands That Built America" from Gangs of New York. At the 46th Annual Grammy Awards, the song earned two nominations: Best Dance Recording, which went to Kylie Minogue's "Come Into My World", and Best Short Form Music Video, awarded to "Hurt" by Johnny Cash. In contrast, the track was also nominated for Worst Original Song at the 23rd Golden Raspberry Awards, where Madonna was named Worst Supporting Actress for her cameo in the film.

== Chart performance ==
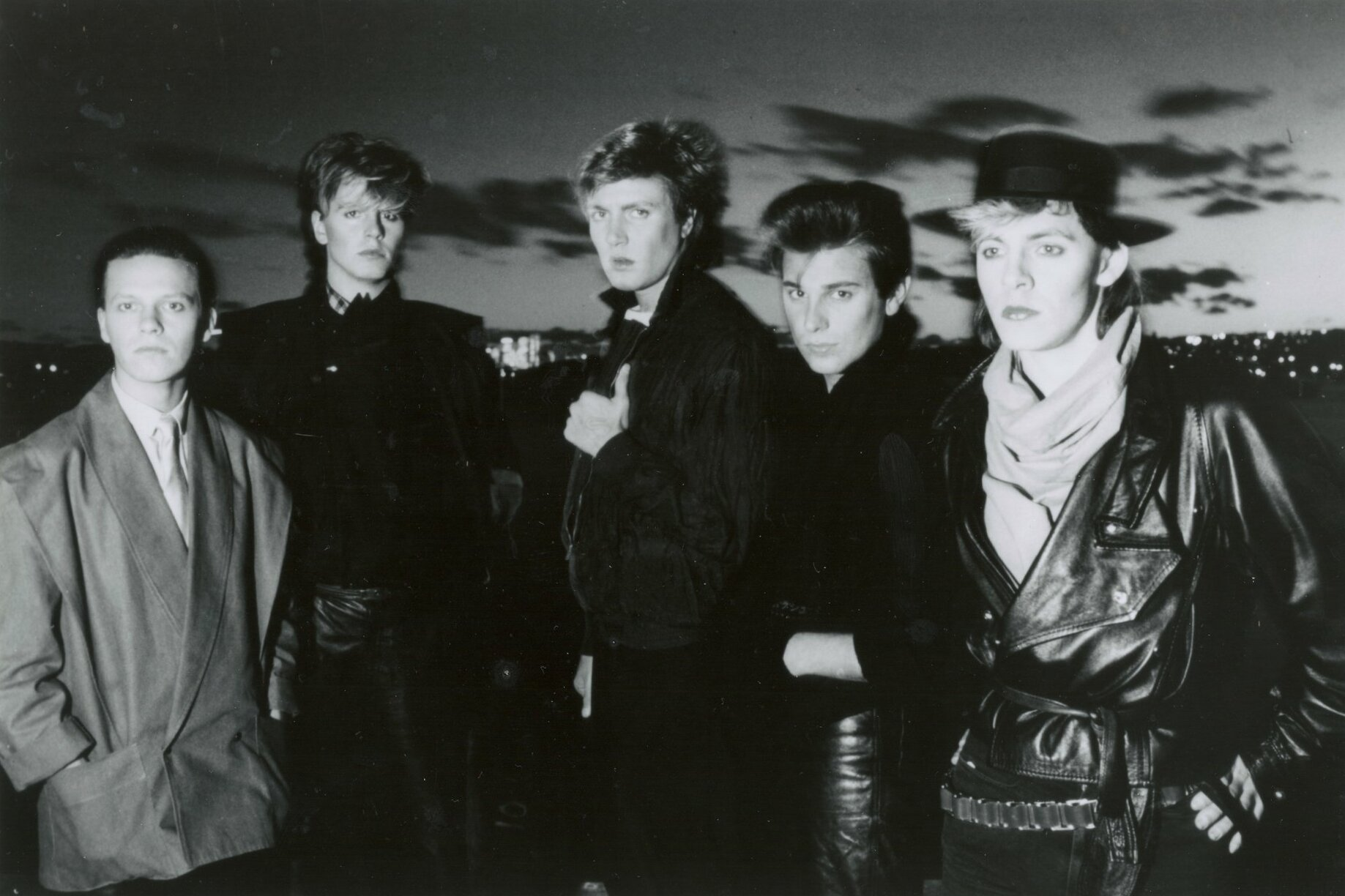
"Die Another Day" became only the second James Bond theme to reach the top ten of the Billboard Hot 100, following "A View to Kill" (1985) by Duran Duran (picture).

"Die Another Day" achieved strong commercial success worldwide. In the United States, the song debuted at number 41 on the Billboard Hot 100—then the highest debut of 2002—and later peaked at number 8. It marked Madonna's 35th top-ten hit, pushing her ahead of the Beatles and placing her just one behind Elvis Presley's record at the time. It also became the first James Bond theme to reach the Hot 100's top ten since Duran Duran's "A View to Kill" in 1985, and would remain the last until "Skyfall" by Adele a decade later. On Billboard's Hot Dance Club Songs chart, it became Madonna's 28th number-one single, and was the best-selling dance single of both 2002 and 2003. By 2013, it had sold over 232,000 digital downloads in the US, ranking among Madonna's top pre-2005 digital singles.

In Canada, "Die Another Day" peaked at number one and remained there for four weeks, earning double platinum certification. The song also performed strongly across Europe, hitting number one in Italy and Spain, and reaching the top ten in countries such as Germany, Sweden, and the Netherlands. In the United Kingdom, it debuted and peaked at number three with first-week sales of 52,500 copies—held off the top spot by DJ Sammy and Yanou's rendition of Bryan Adams' "Heaven", and "Dilemma" by Nelly and Kelly Rowland. It ended the year as the UK's 80th best-selling single and was certified silver in 2015. Additional certifications included gold in France and Australia, where the song reached number five. In New Zealand, it was less successful, peaking at number 22.

== Music video ==
=== Background and filming ===
The music video for "Die Another Day" was directed by Swedish collective Traktor—Mats Lindberg, Pontus Löwenhielm, and Ole Sanders—known for their work in television advertising. Cinematography was handled by Harris Savides. With a production budget of $6.1 million ($10.92 million in 2025 dollars), it became the second most expensive music video ever made, behind only "Scream" (1995) by Michael and Janet Jackson. Filming took place in August 2002 at Hollywood Center Studios in California.

Traktor was contacted months earlier with a handwritten letter and a demo from Madonna, initially prompting skepticism. After confirming the offer, Sanders met with Bond producer Barbara Broccoli at London's Pinewood Studios and later with Madonna herself. According to Sanders, the singer was meticulous, clear, and highly involved in the creative process, demanding precise and well-prepared contributions from the team. The video was conceived as a standalone piece, "Bond-inspired" but containing no footage from the film.

Madonna described its theme as "don't fuck with me [...] pain is an illusion and death is just a doorway". She portrays a secret agent in a torture chamber and engages in a fencing duel with a doppelgänger—referencing her role as Verity. Post-production was led by London's Moving Picture Company (MPC), where extensive visual effects were applied, including CGI wounds, green screen battles, and stylized blood made from ketchup and Worcestershire sauce. The final frame, a reimagining of the Bond gun barrel sequence, was captured in 2K resolution and color-graded directly from the film negatives to enhance clarity and texture.

=== Synopsis and release ===
Scene of "Die Another Day" in which two Madonnas―one in black, the other in white―fight each other.

It opens with Madonna being dragged by soldiers into a torture chamber, battered and marked with three Hebrew letters—Lamed, Aleph and Vav—on her forearm. After being violently thrown around and submerged in icy water, she breaks into a defiant, provocative dance amid chains and broken glass. Intercut throughout is a fencing duel between two Madonnas—one in black, one in white—inside a sterile glass-lit room. Their inflicted wounds mirror those of the tortured Madonna. The sequence features nods to past Bond films, including a portrait of Pierce Brosnan and a character with "deadly bowler hats", portrayed by the nephew of actor Harold Sakata, who starred in Goldfinger (1964) as Oddjob.

In the final act, Madonna wraps phylacteries around her arm and hides behind an electric chair before being strapped in by her captors. As one soldier pulls the switch, the white Madonna defeats the black one with a speargun. The tortured Madonna vanishes, leaving only the burned Hebrew letters on the chair, much to the captors' shock. The video ends with her escaping the chamber, followed by the Bond gun barrel sequence.

The video premiered on MTV on October 10, 2002, alongside an episode of Making the Video. It was later included on the enhanced edition of the film's soundtrack and the DVD release, and featured again in Madonna's 2009 compilation Celebration: The Video Collection.

=== Analysis and reception ===
Santiago Fouz-Hernández, co-author of Madonna's Drowned Worlds, interpreted the fencing duel between Madonna and her doppelgänger as a symbolic split of identity. Mary Gabriel further interpreted the white Madonna's triumph over the black-clad version as a metaphorical "death of the ego". The Hebrew letters—lamed, aleph, and vav—seen tattooed on Madonna's arm and later scorched into the electric chair, form one of the 72 names of God and are linked to ego transcendence in Kabbalistic tradition. Joanna Rydzewska, writing in Representing Gender in Cultures, saw the video's violence as a reflection of Madonna's tumultuous marriage to actor Sean Penn, contrasting with her image as a fiercely independent artist. Gabriel concluded that despite being surrounded by male captors, "[Madonna's] the toughest of them all".

The video's use of Jewish symbolism sparked some controversy. Rabbi Yitzhak Bazri publicly condemned Madonna for wearing phylacteries—a ritual typically reserved for men—calling it "forbidden" and "disgraceful". Michael Berg, one of Madonna's Kabbalah advisers, explained that phylacteries represent a spiritual shift from selfishness to generosity, though he acknowledged it was rare for women to wear them and some might see it as sacrilegious. Madonna's publicist Liz Rosenberg defended the video, saying the singer's intentions were "honorable". Gabriel also noted that not all reactions were negative; some Jewish scholars believed Madonna's performance could even inspire lapsed Jews to reconnect with their faith.

For Parade, Samuel R. Murrian suggested the visual upstaged the Die Another Day film itself, while TheBacklot's Louis Virtel ranked it 25th among Madonna's best videos. At the 2003 MTV Video Music Awards, "Die Another Day" was nominated for Best Video from a Film but lost to Eminem's "Lose Yourself". Nevertheless, it won Soundtrack Video of the Year at the MVPA Awards.

== Live performances ==
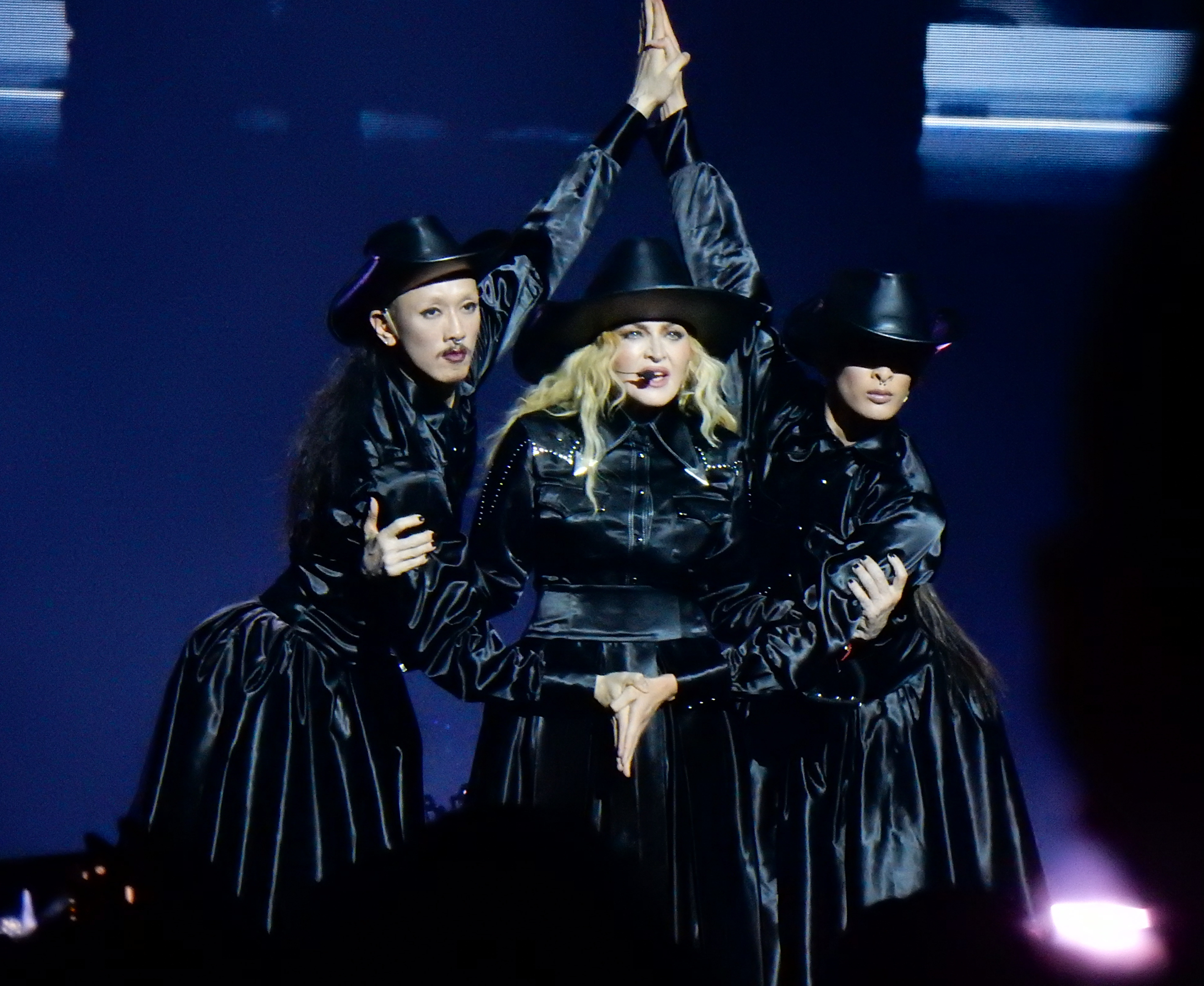
Madonna singing "Die Another Day" on the Celebration Tour (2023―2024)

Initial reports by The Observer suggested Madonna would sing "Die Another Day" before Queen Elizabeth II at the film's London premiere, though said performance did not materialize. A tango-inspired version was later featured on 2004's Re-Invention World Tour, with "abstract" ballroom choreography, Madonna in circus-themed costuming, and visuals of X-rays and a dying old man. The number concluded with the singer strapped to an electric chair, a moment Toronto Sun critic Jane Stevenson called "wonderfully inventive". A recording of the performance appeared on her first live album, I'm Going to Tell You a Secret (2006).

A remix by DJ Enferno was used as video interlude on 2008―2009's Sticky & Sweet Tour. Onstage, two dancers dressed as boxers fought in a stylized match, while video screens showed a battered and bleeding Madonna, also in boxing gear. Slant Magazine's Paul Schrodt praised the visceral staging, noting the singer's willingness to "get dirty" for her art. The number was included on the Sticky & Sweet Tour live album release (2010), filmed in Buenos Aires.

On July 26, 2012, during the MDNA Tour, Madonna performed a mashup of "Die Another Day" and MDNA album track "Beautiful Killer" at Paris's Olympia hall. A decade later, it was included on the Celebration Tour (2023–2024), opening with a quote by Greek–Armenian philosopher George Gurdjieff flashing on screen: "To be born, we must first die, and to die, we must first awake". Dressed in leather cowboy hats and dusters, Madonna and her dancers delivered an "intricately choreographed" routine amid laser beams and mystical undertones. Variety's Mark Sutherland praised the spectacle but criticized the lack of a live band during the "glitchy" segment.

== Track listing and formats ==
- UK and US 2 × 12-inch promo vinyl
1. A "Die Another Day" (Dirty Vegas Main Mix) – 10:08
2. B1 "Die Another Day" (Thee RetroLectro Mix) – 6:59
3. B2 "Die Another Day" (Deepsky Remix) – 7:27
4. C "Die Another Day" (Thunderpuss Club Mix) – 9:25
5. D "Die Another Day" (Thee Die Another Dub) – 8:26
- UK, US and European 2 × 12-inch vinyl
1. A "Die Another Day" (Dirty Vegas Main Mix) – 10:08
2. B "Die Another Day" (Thunderpuss Club Mix) – 9:25
3. C1 "Die Another Day" (Thee RetroLectro Mix) – 6:59
4. C2 "Die Another Day" (Deepsky Remix) – 7:27
5. D "Die Another Day" (Dirty Vegas Dub) – 9:10
- US 7-inch vinyl
1. A "Die Another Day" (Radio Edit) – 3:27
2. B "Die Another Day" (Album Version) – 4:38
- US CD single
1. "Die Another Day" (Radio Edit) – 3:27
2. "Die Another Day" (Dirty Vegas Main Mix) – 10:08
- European CD single
1. "Die Another Day" (Radio Edit) – 3:27
2. "Die Another Day" (Thunderpuss Club Mix) – 9:25
3. "Die Another Day" (Thee RetroLectro Mix) – 6:59
- US, European, Australia and Japanese CD maxi-single
1. "Die Another Day" (Radio Edit) – 3:27
2. "Die Another Day" (Dirty Vegas Main Mix) – 10:08
3. "Die Another Day" (Thee RetroLectro Mix) – 6:59
4. "Die Another Day" (Thunderpuss Club Mix) – 9:25
5. "Die Another Day" (Deepsky Remix) – 7:27
6. "Die Another Day" (Brother Brown's Bond-Age Club) – 7:51
- German and Australian CD single
1. "Die Another Day" (Radio Edit) – 3:27
2. "Die Another Day" (Dirty Vegas Main Mix) – 10:08
3. "Die Another Day" (Deep Sky Edit) – 4:06

== Credits and personnel ==
Credits adapted from the liner notes of the Die Another Day soundtrack and the American Life album.

- Madonna – lead vocals, background vocals, songwriter, producer
- Mirwais Ahmadzaï – songwriter, producer, programming
- Tim Young – audio mastering at Metropolis Studios, London
- Mark "Spike" Stent – audio mixing at Olympic Studios and Westlake Audio
- Michel Colombier – strings arrangement
- Geoff Foster – strings engineer at AIR Lyndhurst Studios, London
- Tom Hannen – assistant engineer
- Simon Changer – assistant engineer
- Tim Lambert – assistant engineer
- Mert and Marcus – photography
- Frank Maddocks – art direction, design

== Charts ==
=== Weekly charts ===
Weekly chart performance for "Die Another Day"
Chart (2002–2003)	Peak position
Australia (ARIA)	5
Australian Dance (ARIA)	3
Austria (Ö3 Austria Top 40)	2
Belgium (Ultratop 50 Flanders)	7
Belgium (Ultratop 50 Wallonia)	9
Canada (Nielsen SoundScan)	1
Canada CHR (Nielsen BDS)	1
Croatia International Airplay (HRT)	4
Czech Republic (ČNS IFPI)	13
Denmark (Tracklisten)	2
El Salvador (Notimex)	4
Europe (Eurochart Hot 100)	3
Finland (Suomen virallinen lista)	4
France (SNEP)	15
Germany (GfK)	4
Greece (IFPI Greece)	2
Hungary (Rádiós Top 40)	19
Hungary (Single Top 40)	2
Ireland (IRMA)	9
Italy (FIMI)	1
Japan (Oricon Singles Chart)	80
Netherlands (Dutch Top 40)	4
Netherlands (Single Top 100)	5
New Zealand (Recorded Music NZ)	22
Norway (VG-lista)	5
Panama (Notimex)	1
Portugal (AFP)	1
Romania (Romanian Top 100)	1
Scottish Singles Sales (Official Charts)	4
Spain (Promusicae)	1
Sweden (Sverigetopplistan)	4
Switzerland (Schweizer Hitparade)	4
UK Singles (Official Charts)	3
Uruguay (Notimex)	1
US Billboard Hot 100	8
US Adult Pop Airplay (Billboard)	23
US Dance Club Songs (Billboard)	1
US Dance Singles Sales (Billboard)	1
US Pop Airplay (Billboard)	4
US Rhythmic Airplay (Billboard)	22

=== Year-end charts ===
2002 year-end chart performance for "Die Another Day"
Chart (2002)	Position
Australia (ARIA)	82
Australian Dance (ARIA)	18
Austria (Ö3 Austria Top 40)	60
Belgium (Ultratop 50 Flanders)	77
Belgium (Ultratop 50 Wallonia)	65
Brazil (Crowley)	64
Canada (Nielsen SoundScan)	2
Europe (Eurochart Hot 100)	71
France (SNEP)	84
Italy (FIMI)	7
Netherlands (Dutch Top 40)	66
Netherlands (Single Top 100)	71
Spain (AFYVE)	5
Sweden (Hitlistan)	56
Switzerland (Schweizer Hitparade)	44
UK Singles (OCC)	80
UK Airplay (Music Week)	74
US Hot Singles Sales (Billboard)	21
US Maxi-Singles Sales (Billboard)	1

2003 year-end chart performance for "Die Another Day"
Chart (2003)	Position
Australian Dance (ARIA)	10
Italy (FIMI)	47
Romania (Romanian Top 100)	93
US Dance Singles Sales (Billboard)	1
US Hot Singles Sales (Billboard)	8

=== Decade-end charts ===
Decade-end chart performance for "Die Another Day"
Chart (2000–2009)	Position
US Dance Club Songs (Billboard)	18

== Certifications and sales ==
Certifications and sales for "Die Another Day"
Region	Certification	Certified units/sales
Australia (ARIA)	Gold	35,000^{^}
Belgium (BRMA)	Gold	25,000^{*}
Canada (Music Canada)	2× Platinum	20,000^{^}
France (SNEP)	Gold	250,000^{*}
Greece (IFPI Greece)	Gold	10,000^{^}
United Kingdom (BPI)	Silver	225,936
United States	—	422,000 (Note: In the US, "Die Another Day" has sold 190,000 physical units, and 232,000 digital units, bringing its sales total to 422,000 units.)
^{*} Sales figures based on certification alone.^{^} Shipments figures based on certification alone.

== Release history ==
Release dates and formats for "Die Another Day"
Region	Date	Format(s)	Label(s)	Ref.
United States	October 22, 2002	12-inch vinyl; maxi CD	Warner Bros.	
Germany	October 28, 2002	CD; maxi CD	Warner Music	
United Kingdom	October 28, 2002	Cassette; maxi CD (Note: In Australia and the UK, "Die Another Day" was made available in two maxi CD variants.)	Maverick	
France	October 29, 2002	Maxi CD	Maverick	
Australia	November 4, 2002	Maxi CD	Warner Music	
Australia	November 25, 2002	12-invh vinyl	Warner Music	
United States	November 26, 2002	7-inch vinyl	Warner Bros.	
Japan	November 27, 2002	Maxi CD	Warner Music	

== See also ==
- Outline of James Bond
- List of most expensive music videos
- List of number-one singles of 2002 (Canada)
- List of number-one hits of 2002 (Italy)
- List of number-one singles of 2000s in Romania
- List of number-one singles of 2002 (Spain)
- List of number-one dance singles of 2002 (U.S.)
- List of Romanian Top 100 number ones of the 2000s
- List of Madonna tribute albums

== Bibliography ==
- Burlingame, Jon (2012). The Music of James Bond. Oxford University Press. ISBN 9780199986767.
- Easlea, Daryl (2012). Madonna: Blond Ambition. Backbeat Books. ISBN 978-1-61-713034-2.
- Fouz-Hernández, Santiago; Jarman-Ivens, Freya (2004). Madonna's Drowned Worlds. Ashgate Publishing, Ltd. ISBN 0-7546-3372-1.
- Gabriel, Mary (2023). Madonna: A Rebel Life. Hachette UK. ISBN 978-0316456449.
- H. Oleksy, Elzbieta; Rydzewska, Joanna (2004). Representing Gender In Cultures. Peter Lang. ISBN 9783631506677.
- O'Brien, Lucy (2008). Madonna: Like an Icon. Transworld Publishers. ISBN 9780552153614.
- Rooksby, Rikky (2004). The Complete Guide to the Music of Madonna. Omnibus Press. ISBN 0-7119-9883-3.
