= This Is How (We Want You to Get High) =

Single by George Michael

from the album Last Christmas: The Original Motion Picture Soundtrack
- Released: 6 November 2019
- Recorded: 2012–2015
- Studio: AIR (London)
- Genre: Pop
- Length: 4:00 (single version); 5:40 (extended version)
- Label: Sony
- Songwriters: George Michael; James Jackman
- Producers: George Michael; James Jackman

George Michael singles chronology
"Fantasy" (2017)	"This Is How (We Want You to Get High)" (2019)	"Always" (2020)

Music video
- "This Is How (We Want You to Get High)" on YouTube

"This Is How (We Want You to Get High)" is a song by English singer-songwriter George Michael, released posthumously as a single on 6 November 2019, nearly three years after Michael's death. It was featured in the 2019 film, Last Christmas, and appeared on the film's official soundtrack.

== Background ==
"This Is How (We Want You to Get High)" was conceived as a backing track originally given to Michael by his frequent collaborator James Jackman in 2012. According to Jackman, "George phoned me one evening, really excited and said, 'I've got the most amazing hook over your track.' [...] He said, 'I can really hear this working' and played it down the phone. It was classic George Michael, very immediate."

In September 2018, it was reported that Emilia Clarke and Henry Golding would star in a London-set romantic comedy taking place at Christmas, titled Last Christmas. Paul Feig was set to direct, with Emma Thompson and Greg Wise co-writing the screenplay. In October, it was announced that Thompson would star as well, and that the film would feature the music of Michael (who died in 2016), including "Last Christmas", and previously unreleased tracks. Feig told in an interview to BBC News that Michael was about to compile his new album before his death. He described "This Is How (We Want You to Get High)" as "a very celebratory song, I would dare say. And we were able to play the entire song, which is almost six minutes long, in the film. Because when you get a song that has never been heard, you don't want to just use, like, 15 seconds of it. The song starts at the end of the film, and then goes into the credits." Last Christmas was released on 8 November 2019 in the United States, and 15 November 2019 in the United Kingdom.

== Track listing ==
Digital download
No.	Title	Length
1.	"This Is How (We Want You to Get High)" (clean version)	4:00
2.	"This Is How (We Want You to Get High)" (explicit version)	4:00
3.	"This Is How (We Want You to Get High)" (extended)	5:40
Total length:		13:40

== Charts ==
Chart performance for "This Is How (We Want You to Get High)"
Chart (2019)	Peak position
Belgium (Ultratip Bubbling Under Flanders)	13
Belgium (Ultratip Bubbling Under Wallonia)	25
UK Singles Downloads (OCC)	10
UK Singles Sales (OCC)	10

== Release history ==
Country	Date	Format	Label	Ref.
Various	6 November 2019	Digital download; streaming	Sony	
