= Round Here (George Michael song) =

Single by George Michael

from the album Patience
- Released: 1 November 2004
- Genre: Pop; indie rock
- Length: 5:54
- Label: Sony BMG
- Songwriter: George Michael
- Producer: George Michael

George Michael singles chronology
"Flawless (Go to the City)" (2004)	"Round Here" (2004)	"John and Elvis Are Dead" (2005)

Music video
- "Round Here" on YouTube

"Round Here" is a song by English singer-songwriter George Michael from his fifth studio album, Patience. It was released on 1 November 2004 and reached number thirty-two on the UK Singles Chart. The song is about Michael's childhood and how he remembers his first day at school.

== Track listing ==
Enhanced CD single

1. "Round Here" – 5:54
2. "Patience" – 2:53
3. "Round Here" (video) – 4:56

== Music video ==
The music video (directed by Andy Morahan) includes recording the song in studio, plus some clips of Kingsbury, London, where Michael was born.

== Charts ==
Chart (2004)	Peak position
Belgium (Ultratip Bubbling Under Wallonia)	16
Europe (European Hot 100 Singles)	95
Italy (FIMI)	30
Scotland Singles (OCC)	44
Switzerland (Schweizer Hitparade)	55
UK Singles (OCC)	32
