= My Mother Had a Brother =

Song by George Michael

from the album Patience
- Released: 15 March 2004
- Genre: Pop; ballad
- Length: 6:19
- Label: Aegean; Sony; Epic
- Songwriter: George Michael
- Producer: George Michael

"My Mother Had a Brother" is a song by English singer-songwriter George Michael, featured on his fifth studio album, Patience (2004). The track is widely regarded as one of Michael's most personal and emotionally revealing works, addressing themes of suicide, family trauma, generational repression, and homosexuality.

== Background and composition ==
George Michael wrote "My Mother Had a Brother" as a tribute to his maternal uncle, who died by suicide on the day Michael was born. In a 2004 interview with BBC Jo Whiley, Michael explained that his uncle was gay and had struggled to live openly during a time of societal rejection and stigma in the UK. Michael revealed that the contrast between his uncle’s fate and his own success as an openly gay man later in life served as the emotional core of the song.

The lyrics convey guilt and sadness for the generational differences in acceptance. As Michael told The Times, "This song was my way of telling that story. My uncle never got to live his truth, and I did. I was trying to honour him."

Musically, the song is structured as a slow-building ballad with sparse instrumentation, emphasizing Michael’s vocal performance. Critics noted the fusion of classical motifs with pop elements, creating an atmosphere of introspection.

== Critical reception ==
"My Mother Had a Brother" was praised for its lyrical vulnerability and narrative depth. The Guardian described it as "a devastating piece of confessional songwriting," contrasting sharply with the more commercial tracks on Patience. Rolling Stone commented that the song "offers a window into a private pain, delivered with remarkable grace."

== Live performances ==
Though the song was not released as a single, it was performed during Michael's 25 Live tour, where he introduced it with brief personal anecdotes.

== Legacy ==
The song has since been viewed by critics and fans as one of the emotional anchors of Patience. Biographer Rob Jovanovic described it as "Michael at his most reflective—an artist unafraid to explore pain and guilt in his lyrics."

In retrospective reviews, the song has been interpreted as part of a broader cultural shift in early 2000s pop towards more open discussions of mental health and identity.
