= John and Elvis Are Dead =

Single by George Michael

from the album Patience
- B-side: "Edith & the Kingpin"; "For the Love (Of You)"
- Released: 3 October 2005
- Genre: Pop; soul
- Length: 4:23
- Label: Sony BMG
- Songwriter(s): George Michael; David Austin
- Producer(s): George Michael

George Michael singles chronology
| "Round Here" (2004) | "John and Elvis Are Dead" (2005) | "An Easier Affair" (2006) |

Music video
- "John and Elvis Are Dead" on YouTube

"John and Elvis Are Dead" is a song by English singer-songwriter George Michael from his fifth studio album, Patience (2004). It was co-written by childhood friend David Austin. It was released on 3 October 2005 as a download-only single and was therefore unable to chart in the United Kingdom under the chart rules at that time. The song marks Michael's final single from a studio album.

== Music video ==
Directed by Anthea Benton, the music video did not receive heavy airplay, although it remains popular among Michael's fans. It features, among many famous faces both alive and dead at the time of the release of the song, footage of those named in the title: John Lennon and Elvis Presley. In addition to John and Elvis, Marvin Gaye is also mentioned in the chorus of the song. Footage of Freddie Mercury from Queen's music video "Bohemian Rhapsody" is also used, although he is not mentioned. Die Welt noted the religious tones of the song and video.

People shown in the video in order of appearance are:

- Aretha Franklin
- Stevie Wonder
- Buzz Aldrin planting the first American flag on the Moon on July 21, 1969
- Phil Daniels and Leslie Ash driving a Lambretta scooter on Goldhawk Road, Shepherd’s Bush in West London from the film Quadrophenia, based on the rock opera of the same name by The Who
- Elton John as the Pinball Wizard in the 1975 movie Tommy
- David Johansen, vocalist of New York Dolls
- Paul Weller, lead singer of the British band The Jam
- Susan Janet Ballion, known professionally as Siouxsie Sioux, singer of the British band Siouxsie and the Banshees
- Debbie Harry, lead singer of Blondie
- Vivienne Westwood, British fashion designer
- Kathleen Cleaver, activist of the American human rights movement Black Panthers Party
- David Bowie performing "Ashes to Ashes".
- Queen performing "Bohemian Rhapsody".
- Phan Thi Kim Phuc and other children from the South Vietnamese village of Trang Bang running away from a napalm attack on 8 June 1972
- John Lennon
- Lady Diana on the day of her marriage with Prince Charles.
- Nelson Mandela, elected first black president of South Africa after he had been convicted and jailed from June 12, 1964, to February 11, 1990, for fighting for human rights.
- Mother Teresa of Calcutta
- John Lennon and Yoko Ono, being interviewed in their New York apartment.
- Pope John Paul II
- Marvin Gaye
- Elvis Presley

== Track listing ==
Digital EP

1. "John and Elvis Are Dead" – 4:23
2. "Edith & the Kingpin" (live at Abbey Road) – 3:46
3. "Praying for Time" (live at Abbey Road) – 4:57
4. "For the Love (Of You)"
5. "Precious Box" (Shapeshifters remix)
