= Last Christmas (soundtrack) =

Last Christmas: The Original Motion Picture Soundtrack

Soundtrack album by George Michael and Wham!
- Released: 8 November 2019
- Length: 71:59
- Label: Legacy

George Michael chronology
Listen Without Prejudice / MTV Unplugged (2017)	Last Christmas: The Original Motion Picture Soundtrack (2019)

Wham! chronology
The Best of Wham!: If You Were There... (1997)	Last Christmas: The Original Motion Picture Soundtrack (2019)	The Singles: Echoes from the Edge of Heaven (2023)

Last Christmas: The Original Motion Picture Soundtrack is the soundtrack album for the 2019 film Last Christmas directed by Paul Feig. It was released on 8 November 2019 by Legacy Recordings, on the date of the film's release. The album consists of songs performed solely by George Michael and with Andrew Ridgeley as Wham!, including 14 existing songs, as well as a previously unreleased song originally completed in 2015 titled "This Is How (We Want You to Get High)". It additionally featured a bonus track, released on the Japanese edition. The album charted internationally in 2019 and received positive reviews.

== Background ==
"I was a casual fan; I knew the hits; I didn't know the deep tracks. When I discovered songs like 'Heal the Pain', which I hadn't heard before, suddenly I was like, 'This is the movie.' And I kept having that experience with these songs and then the movie almost started to want these songs, as weird as it sounds. We'd be in the editing room and [think] 'We need a song here.' And you look at the song and you think, 'Wait, this matches perfectly, tonally and with the lyrics and all.' So we went from maybe we were going to have five songs to having 15 songs."

— Paul Feig on using George Michael's songs in the film

Last Christmas is based on Michael and Ridgeley's eponymous song released in 1984, and also inspired from their music. Feig told in an interview to BBC News, that Michael was about to compile his new album before his death in 2016. Hence, he discovered the unreleased song "This Is How (We Want You to Get High)" that was recorded in 2015, and included it as a part of the soundtrack, which Feig had ultimately said, "It's a very celebratory song, I would dare say. And we were able to play the entire song, which is almost six minutes long, in the film. Because when you get a song that has never been heard, you don't want to just use, like, 15 seconds of it. The song starts at the end of the film, and then goes into the credits." Livingstone, the film's producer who had consulted Michael in the past and considered his involvement before his death, referred to the film as "the last sanctioned project he signed off on".

Feig felt that Michael's music affects the story, further adding: "There are a couple of sections where the actors are actually interacting with the music and other sections where George's music is driving, or underscoring the story. So it's a nice mix of being neither a jukebox movie nor straight up musical."

== Release ==
The album was released on digital, CD and two-disc vinyl formats on 8 November 2019, by Legacy Recordings. The album consists of remastered and edited versions of songs produced by George Michael and Wham! with an additional track on the Japanese edition.

== Reception ==
Pip-Eliwood Hughes of Entertainment Focus wrote "Whether or not audiences are loving Last Christmas in cinemas, this soundtrack should get plenty of attention. It's a whistlestop tour of George Michael's remarkable career and there's no doubt he had a lasting impact on music. Had his life not been cut short, he would have made plenty more music to add to his legacy. At least we'll always have these songs and Last Christmas is a concise history of the iconic star's long-lasting legacy."

== Track listing ==
Last Christmas: The Original Motion Picture Soundtrack track listing
No.	Title	Length
1.	"Last Christmas"	4:24
2.	"Too Funky" (single edit)	3:46
3.	"Fantasy"	5:01
4.	"Praying for Time" (remastered)	4:41
5.	"Faith" (remastered)	3:16
6.	"Waiting for That Day" (remastered)	4:51
7.	"Heal the Pain" (remastered)	4:45
8.	"One More Try" (remastered)	5:50
9.	"Fastlove" (part 1)	5:29
10.	"Everything She Wants" (edit)	5:29
11.	"Wake Me Up Before You Go-Go" (edit)	3:52
12.	"Move On"	4:47
13.	"Freedom! '90" (remastered)	6:30
14.	"Praying for Time" (MTV Unplugged version)	5:15
15.	"This Is How (We Want You to Get High)"	4:01
Total length:		71:59

Japanese version (bonus track)
No.	Title	Length
16.	"Last Christmas" (Pudding mix)	6:49
Total length:		78:48

== Charts ==
=== Weekly charts ===
Weekly chart performance for Last Christmas
Chart (2019–2026)	Peak position
Australian Albums (ARIA)	7
Austrian Albums (Ö3 Austria)	60
Belgian Albums (Ultratop Flanders)	74
Belgian Albums (Ultratop Wallonia)	82
Canadian Albums (Billboard)	2
Dutch Albums (Album Top 100)	13
French Albums (SNEP)	178
German Albums (Offizielle Top 100)	85
Irish Albums (Official Charts)	26
Italian Albums (FIMI)	70
Portuguese Albums (AFP)	33
Spanish Albums (Promusicae)	37
UK Albums (Official Charts)	9
UK Soundtrack Albums (Official Charts)	1
US Billboard 200	16
US Soundtrack Albums (Billboard)	2

=== Year-end charts ===
2020 year-end chart performance for Last Christmas
Chart (2020)	Position
US Soundtrack Albums (Billboard)	24

2021 year-end chart performance for Last Christmas
Chart (2021)	Position
US Soundtrack Albums (Billboard)	20

2022 year-end chart performance for Last Christmas
Chart (2022)	Position
US Soundtrack Albums (Billboard)	25

2025 year-end chart performance for Last Christmas
Chart (2025)	Position
US Soundtrack Albums (Billboard)	17

== Score album ==
Last Christmas score track listing
No.	Title	Length
1.	"Secret Garden"	2:24
2.	"Upward-Looking Stranger"	0:52
3.	"The Dane"	1:21
4.	"You Again"	1:43
5.	"Stupid Stupid Girl"	1:43
6.	"Homeless Again"	1:14
7.	"Self-Pity Party"	3:26
8.	"Walk This Way"	1:37
9.	"Santa and the Dane"	1:17
10.	"Looking for Tom"	0:47
11.	"The Scar"	6:38
12.	"Busking"	0:45
13.	"Riches"	0:44
14.	"Back from County Brexit"	1:55
15.	"Take Care"	2:39
Total length:		29:05
