= Flawless (Go to the City) =

2004 single by George Michael

Single by George Michael

from the album Patience
- B-side: "Please Send Me Someone (Anselmo's Song)"
- Released: 28 June 2004
- Length: 6:51 (album version); 4:50 (single version); 3:53 (video version)
- Label: Aegean; Sony Music UK
- Songwriters: George Michael; Paul Alexander; Nashom Wooden; Gary Turnier; Eric Matthew; Olivier Stumm
- Producer: George Michael

George Michael singles chronology
| "Amazing" (2004) | "Flawless (Go to the City)" (2004) | "Round Here" (2004) |

Music video
- "Flawless (Go to the City)" on YouTube

"Flawless (Go to the City)" is a song co-written and performed by English singer-songwriter George Michael and released by Sony BMG on 28 June 2004. It samples "Flawless" (2001), originally recorded by the electronic music band the Ones, which in turn samples "Keep On Dancin'" (1978), originally recorded by Gary's Gang, and "Romeo and Juliet" by Alec R. Costandinos. The song was taken from Michael's album Patience.

The single charted at No. 8 on the UK Singles Chart. It became a dance hit, especially in the United States, where it reached No. 1 on Billboard's Dance Club Play and Dance Singles Sales charts.

== Music video ==
The song's music video (directed by Jake Scott), which was in one long take co-conceived by Michael with concept developer Andrew Trovaioli, begins with a man in his hotel room bathroom, urinating. As the occupant freshens up and as the song builds up to its main dance beat, several people of various ethnic groups also enter the room. The dancers begin to undress and re-dress themselves, all as if they have either just got out of the shower themselves, or come home from work. Michael appears in the centre of the room, singing while seated on the bed. The camera zooms out to show the full hotel suite when the entire cast performs a brief, synchronized dance sequence. After this exchange, a hotel employee comes by the door with room service as the occupant is still dressing himself. The employee dances briefly as the occupant turns away to grab a pen to sign for the meal. As the song fades out, the dancers vacate when the occupant sits down to dinner in front of the television, with Michael turning out the lights and leaving the room last.

== Track listing ==
UK CD single 1

1. "Flawless (Go to the City)" (radio edit) – 4:50
2. "Please Send Me Someone (Anselmo's Song)" (alternative version edit) – 5:02

UK CD single 2

1. "Flawless (Go to the City)" (album version) – 6:51
2. "Flawless (Go to the City)" (Jack 'N' Rory vocal mix) – 6:44
3. "Flawless (Go to the City)" (Shapeshifters remix) – 7:06
4. "Flawless (Go to the City)" (Boxer mix) – 5:56
5. "Flawless (Go to the City)" (The Sharp Boys Hot Fridge vocal mix) – 8:03

== Charts ==
=== Weekly charts ===
| Chart (2004) | Peak position |
|---|---|
| Australia (ARIA) | 26 |
| Austria (Ö3 Austria Top 40) | 72 |
| Belgium (Ultratop 50 Flanders) | 35 |
| Belgium (Ultratip Bubbling Under Wallonia) | 2 |
| Denmark (Tracklisten) | 8 |
| Germany (GfK) | 54 |
| Hungary (Single Top 40) | 4 |
| Hungary (Dance Top 40) | 9 |
| Ireland (IRMA) | 23 |
| Ireland Dance (IRMA) | 2 |
| Italy (FIMI) | 7 |
| Netherlands (Single Top 100) | 30 |
| Scottish Singles Sales (Official Charts) | 8 |
| Spain (Promusicae) | 2 |
| Switzerland (Schweizer Hitparade) | 36 |
| UK Singles (Official Charts) | 8 |
| US Dance Airplay (Billboard) | 18 |
| US Dance Club Songs (Billboard) | 1 |
| US Dance Singles Sales (Billboard) | 1 |
| US Hot Singles Sales (Billboard) | 22 |

=== Year-end charts ===
| Chart (2004) | Position |
|---|---|
| UK Singles (OCC) | 129 |
| US Dance Club Play (Billboard) | 40 |

== Release history ==
| Region | Date | Format(s) | Label(s) | Ref. |
|---|---|---|---|---|
| Denmark | 28 June 2004 | 12-inch vinyl; CD | Aegean; Sony Music UK | |
| United Kingdom | 28 June 2004 | 12-inch vinyl; CD | Aegean; Sony Music UK | |
| Australia | 5 July 2004 | CD | Aegean; Epic | |

== See also ==
- List of number-one dance singles of 2004 (U.S.)
