= Shoot the Dog =

2002 single by George Michael

Single by George Michael

from the album Patience
- Released: 29 July 2002
- Genre: Synth-pop
- Length: 5:01
- Label: Polydor
- Songwriters: George Michael; Philip Oakey; Ian Burden
- Producer: George Michael

George Michael singles chronology
"Freeek!" (2002)	"Shoot the Dog" (2002)	"Amazing" (2004)

"Shoot the Dog" is a song by British singer-songwriter George Michael, released as the second single from his fifth and final studio album, Patience, though released a year and a half prior to the album. It was his last release for Polydor Records, after which he departed from that label and returned to Sony Music, on which the album Patience, including the song "Shoot the Dog", was released. The song is a protest song referring to (and critical of) British Prime Minister Tony Blair and American President George W. Bush. Released on 29 July 2002, it peaked at number one in Denmark and number 12 in the United Kingdom.

The music video for the song is completely animated. The single marked 20 years since the release of Wham!'s first single, "Wham Rap! (Enjoy What You Do)", another politically charged song written by Michael. "Shoot the Dog" samples the Human League's 1981 song "Love Action (I Believe in Love)". It also samples the "That's right!" vocal from the Silver Convention's 1976 song "Get Up and Boogie", as well as the "Gotta get up" vocal from Michael's own song "Fastlove" (1996).

== Lyrics ==
Michael has said of the song:

'Shoot the Dog' is simply my attempt to contribute to the public debate that I feel should be taking place regarding Iraq and Saddam Hussein. [...] I have tried to convey my message with humour, because the public is rightfully scared of these issues, and humour has often been a useful aide to political debate.

== Music video ==
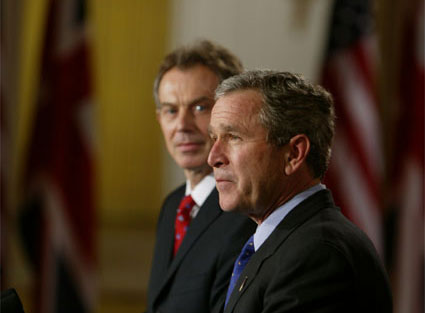
"Shoot the Dog' is a protest song referring to (and critical of) British Prime Minister Tony Blair and American President George W. Bush, who are both spoofed in the song's music video

The music video featured animation provided by the satirical British cartoon series 2DTV. It originally premiered as a 'world exclusive' on MTV and VH1 simultaneously on July 2, 2002, and was the number-one music video on rotation between July and August 2002. VH1 broadcast the video several days before the song first saw radio play.

The video depicts a frustrated general attempting to explain the geopolitical situation surrounding the war on terror to President Bush using Michael's music. Tony Blair is satirised as a literal lapdog of the Bush administration, playing "fetch" and being petted by Bush. The video also depicts Michael as a parody of Homer Simpson, who is bullied by a next door neighbour (an allegory for the U.S.'s alleged envy of Iraq's rich oil reserves, which is thought by critics to have been a primary motivation for the war on terror), and Michael attempting to seduce Cherie Blair into having her husband stop going along with Bush. A caricature of Geri Halliwell makes a cameo appearance in which she tries to join the video as one of Michael's backup singers.

== Track listings ==
UK, South African, Australian, and Japanese CD single

1. "Shoot the Dog" (explicit album version)
2. "Shoot the Dog" (Moogymen mix)
3. "Shoot the Dog" (Alexkid Shoot the Radio remix)
4. "Shoot the Dog" (video)

UK cassette single

1. "Shoot the Dog" (explicit album version)
2. "Shoot the Dog" (Moogymen remix)

European and Japanese DVD single

1. "Shoot the Dog" – 5:35
2. "Freeek!" – 4:33

== Charts ==
Chart (2002)	Peak position
Australia (ARIA)	36
Austria (Ö3 Austria Top 40)	41
Belgium (Ultratop 50 Flanders)	46
Belgium (Ultratip Bubbling Under Wallonia)	1
Canada (Nielsen SoundScan)	31
Denmark (Tracklisten)	1
Europe (European Hot 100 Singles)	28
France (SNEP)	59
Germany (GfK)	44
Hungary (Single Top 40)	7
Ireland (IRMA)	23
Italy (FIMI)	5
Netherlands (Single Top 100)	26
Portugal (AFP)	2
Romania (Romanian Top 100	21
Scotland Singles (OCC)	15
Spain (Promusicae)	4
Sweden (Sverigetopplistan)	39
Switzerland (Schweizer Hitparade)	14
UK Singles (OCC)	12

== Release history ==
Region	Version	Date	Format(s)	Label(s)	Ref.
United Kingdom	"Shoot the Dog"	29 July 2002	CD; cassette	Polydor	
Australia	"Shoot the Dog"	5 August 2002	CD	Polydor	
Japan	"Shoot the Dog"	21 August 2002	CD	Polydor	
Japan	"Shoot the Dog" / "Freeek!"	4 December 2002	DVD	Polydor	

== See also ==
- "Land of Confusion" by Genesis (a protest song that featured caricatures of celebrities and politicians, provided by Spitting Image, in the music video)
- List of number-one songs of the 2000s (Denmark)
