= Heal the Pain =

1991 single by George Michael

Single by George Michael

from the album Listen Without Prejudice Vol. 1
- B-side: "Soul Free"
- Written: June 1990
- Released: 4 February 1991
- Genre: Pop; folk-pop
- Length: 4:46
- Label: Epic
- Songwriter: George Michael
- Producer: George Michael

George Michael singles chronology
"Freedom! '90" (1990)	"Heal the Pain" (1991)	"Cowboys and Angels" (1991)

Licensed audio
- "Heal the Pain" on YouTube

"Heal the Pain" is a song written and performed by English singer-songwriter George Michael and released on Epic Records in February 1991. A contemplative, acoustic guitar-based love song, it was the fourth of five UK singles taken from his second solo album, Listen Without Prejudice Vol. 1 (1990).

The song entered the UK singles chart in February 1991 and peaked at number 31. It followed a pattern of being slightly lower than its predecessor (the previous three singles had peaked at numbers 6, 23 and 28, respectively). One more single from the album would continue the pattern, by not even breaking the threshold of the top 40. "Soul Free", also taken from Listen Without Prejudice Vol. 1, appeared as the B-side. For the fourth US single, Columbia Records used "Soul Free" as the A-side and "Cowboys and Angels" as the B-side, but the single did not chart.

The band Lemon Jelly used an uncredited sample of the track on the B-side of their single "Rolled/Oats". Brazilian singers Fernanda Takai and Samuel Rosa recorded a version of the song in Portuguese titled "Pra Curar Essa Dor", for Takai's fourth studio album, Na Medida do Impossível, released in 2014.

== Critical reception ==
Adam Sweeting from The Guardian named "Heal the Pain" one of the "best tracks" of Listen Without Prejudice Vol. 1. He added that the song "with its close harmonies and neck-brushing acoustic guitars, is the Paul McCartney ballad the Fab One never wrote." A reviewer from Music & Media wrote, "Comforting, Beatles-type pop. If the Beatles are the healer, Michael is the dealer." Alan Jones from Music Week named it Pick of the Week, declaring it as a "gentle acoustically jangling, intimately sung ballad", noting that it was Michael's personal favourite. He concluded, "Not a Top 10 hit, but a breath of fresh air."

== Personnel ==
Personnel taken from Listen Without Prejudice Vol. 1 liner notes.

- George Michael – vocals, acoustic guitar solos
- Danny Cummings – percussion
- Phil Palmer – guitars
- Deon Estus – bass

== Charts ==
=== Weekly charts ===
Chart (1991)	Peak position
Belgium (Ultratop 50 Flanders)	36
Europe (Eurochart Hot 100)	57
Europe (European Hit Radio)	6
Ireland (IRMA)	16
Luxembourg (Radio Luxembourg)	17
Netherlands (Dutch Top 40)	16
Netherlands (Single Top 100)	25
UK Singles (OCC)	31
UK Airplay (Music Week)	1

=== Year-end charts ===
Chart (1991)	Position
Europe (European Hit Radio)	78

== 2006 version ==
"Heal the Pain"

Promotional single by George Michael and Paul McCartney

from the album Twenty Five (US release)
- Released: 2008
- Recorded: week of 28 November 2005
- Genre: Pop
- Length: 4:46
- Label: Epic
- Songwriter: George Michael
- Producer: George Michael

George Michael singles chronology
"This Is Not Real Love" (2006)	"Heal the Pain" (2008)	"December Song (I Dreamed of Christmas)" (2008)

Paul McCartney singles chronology
"Nod Your Head" (2007)	"Heal the Pain" (2008)	"Sing the Changes" (2008)

In 2005, it was announced that Michael would be recording a version of the track with Paul McCartney, in whose style the song was written. Michael appeared on the Chris Evans show on BBC Radio 2 on 5 December 2005, and announced that he had recorded the song with McCartney "last week" but did not know what he was going to do with it yet. The track was included on the greatest hits collection Twenty Five (2006), and was released as a promotional single from the US release of the album in 2008.
