= David Austin (singer) =

British singer and songwriter

- Born: David Mortimer
- Origin: United Kingdom
- Genres: Pop
- Occupations: Songwriter; record producer; film-maker; artist manager
- Formerly of: Boogie Box High

David Austin (born David Mortimer) is a British singer and songwriter, who released the single "Turn to Gold", co-written with George Michael in 1984. It reached No. 68 in the UK Singles Chart. The single featured backing vocals from Michael, who called Austin his best friend in the documentary film, A Different Story.

== Early life and career ==
Austin was born to Irish parents. His father manufactured trumpets and other instruments for the British music company Boosey & Hawkes. By the age of six, Austin had learned to use a Revox recording machine and recorded several songs with Michael, including "Crocodile Rock" by Elton John, "Wig-Wam Bam" by the Sweet—Michael's favorite band—and their first co-written original, "The Music Maker of the World". During 1979–1980, Austin performed in a short-lived ska band called the Executive, along with Michael, Andrew and Paul Ridgeley, Andrew Leaver, Jamie Gould, and Tony Bywaters.

Austin's debut single, "Turn to Gold", was released in May 1984, and featured Michael on backing vocals. His follow-up single, "This Boy Loves the Sun", was released in the late summer of 1984, but did not chart. A third single, "Love While You Can" was released only in Japan. This also featured uncredited vocals by Michael.

Formerly busking partners, Austin and Michael's joint work included the download-only single "John and Elvis Are Dead", "You Have Been Loved" and "Look at Your Hands" from Michael's debut studio album, Faith. Co-written by Austin, "December Song (I Dreamed of Christmas)" was a Christmas single released by Michael on 14 December 2009.

Along with Michael, Austin directed the documentary film George Michael: Freedom, detailing Michael's early solo career and his court case with his record label, Sony Music. An edited version of the film was aired in October 2017 on Channel 4; the original cut premiered in theatres worldwide on 22 June 2022, under the title Freedom Uncut.

He appears as a guitarist in Wham!'s video for the song "The Edge of Heaven".
