= Freeek! =

2002 single by George Michael

Single by George Michael

from the album Patience
- B-side: "The Long and Winding Road"
- Released: 18 March 2002
- Genre: Funk; urban pop
- Length: 4:33
- Label: Polydor; Aegean
- Songwriters: George Michael; Moogymen
- Producer: George Michael

George Michael singles chronology
"If I Told You That" (2000)	"Freeek!" (2002)	"Shoot the Dog" (2002)

"Freeek!" is a song written and performed by English singer George Michael. The song contains samples from "Try Again" by Aaliyah, "Breathe and Stop" by Q-Tip, and "N.T." by Kool & the Gang. A remastered version called "Freeek! '04" was later included on Michael's fifth and final studio album, Patience (2004).

The single was released on 18 March 2002; the first of six to come from Patience, although the album itself was not released until 2004. The song peaked at number seven on the UK Singles Chart and also charted within the top ten in many other European countries. It topped the charts of Denmark, Hungary, Italy, Portugal, and Spain and reached number five in Australia.

== Music video ==
The music video for "Freeek!", directed by Joseph Kahn, incorporates a futuristic theme, including cyborgs and sophisticated technology recalling the film Blade Runner, with a sexually aggressive tone. The directorial effects in the video were first used in Janet Jackson's "Doesn't Really Matter" video, also directed by Kahn.

With a production budget of $2 million (equivalent to $3,580,019 in 2025), the music video for "Freeek!" was among the most expensive music videos made.

== Track listings ==
UK and Australian CD1

1. "Freeek!"
2. "Freeek!" (The Scumfrogs mix)
3. "Freeek!" (Moogymen mix)

UK and Australian CD2

1. "Freeek!"
2. "Freeek!" (Max Reich mix)
3. "The Long and Winding Road" (Beatles cover)

UK cassette single and European CD single

1. "Freeek!"
2. "The Long and Winding Road" (Beatles cover)

Japanese CD single

1. "Freeek!"
2. "Freeek!" (The Scumfrogs mix)
3. "Freeek!" (Moogymen mix)
4. "Freeek!" (Max Reich mix)
5. "The Long and Winding Road" (Beatles cover)

== Charts ==
=== Weekly charts ===
Chart (2002)	Peak position
Australia (ARIA)	5
Australian Dance (ARIA)	2
Austria (Ö3 Austria Top 40)	7
Belgium (Ultratop 50 Flanders)	21
Belgium (Ultratop 50 Wallonia)	11
Denmark (Tracklisten)	1
Europe (European Hot 100 Singles)	1
Finland (Suomen virallinen lista)	6
France (SNEP)	7
Germany (GfK)	7
Greece (IFPI)	4
Hungary (Mahasz)	1
Ireland (IRMA)	14
Italy (FIMI)	1
Japan (Oricon)	93
Netherlands (Dutch Top 40)	8
Netherlands (Single Top 100)	12
New Zealand (Recorded Music NZ)	15
Norway (VG-lista)	7
Portugal (AFP)	1
Romania (Romanian Top 100)	9
Scottish Singles Sales (Official Charts)	9
Spain (Promusicae)	1
Sweden (Sverigetopplistan)	26
Switzerland (Schweizer Hitparade)	2
UK Singles (Official Charts)	7

=== Year-end charts ===
Chart (2002)	Position
Europe (European Hot 100 Singles)	99
Italy (FIMI)	19
Netherlands (Dutch Top 40)	147
Switzerland (Schweizer Hitparade)	66
UK Singles (OCC)	117

== Certifications and sales ==
Region	Certification	Certified units/sales
Australia (ARIA)	Gold	35,000^{^}
^{^} Shipments figures based on certification alone.

== Release history ==
Region	Version	Date	Format(s)	Label(s)	Ref(s).
United Kingdom	"Freeek!"	18 March 2002	CD	Polydor; Aegean	
Australia	"Freeek!"	18 March 2002	CD	Polydor; Aegean	
Japan	"Freeek!"	20 March 2002	CD	Polydor; Aegean	
Japan	"Shoot the Dog" / "Freeek!"	4 December 2002	DVD	Polydor	

== See also ==
- List of number-one hits of 2002 (Italy)
- List of number-one singles of 2002 (Spain)
- List of number-one songs of the 2000s (Denmark)
