= George Michael discography =

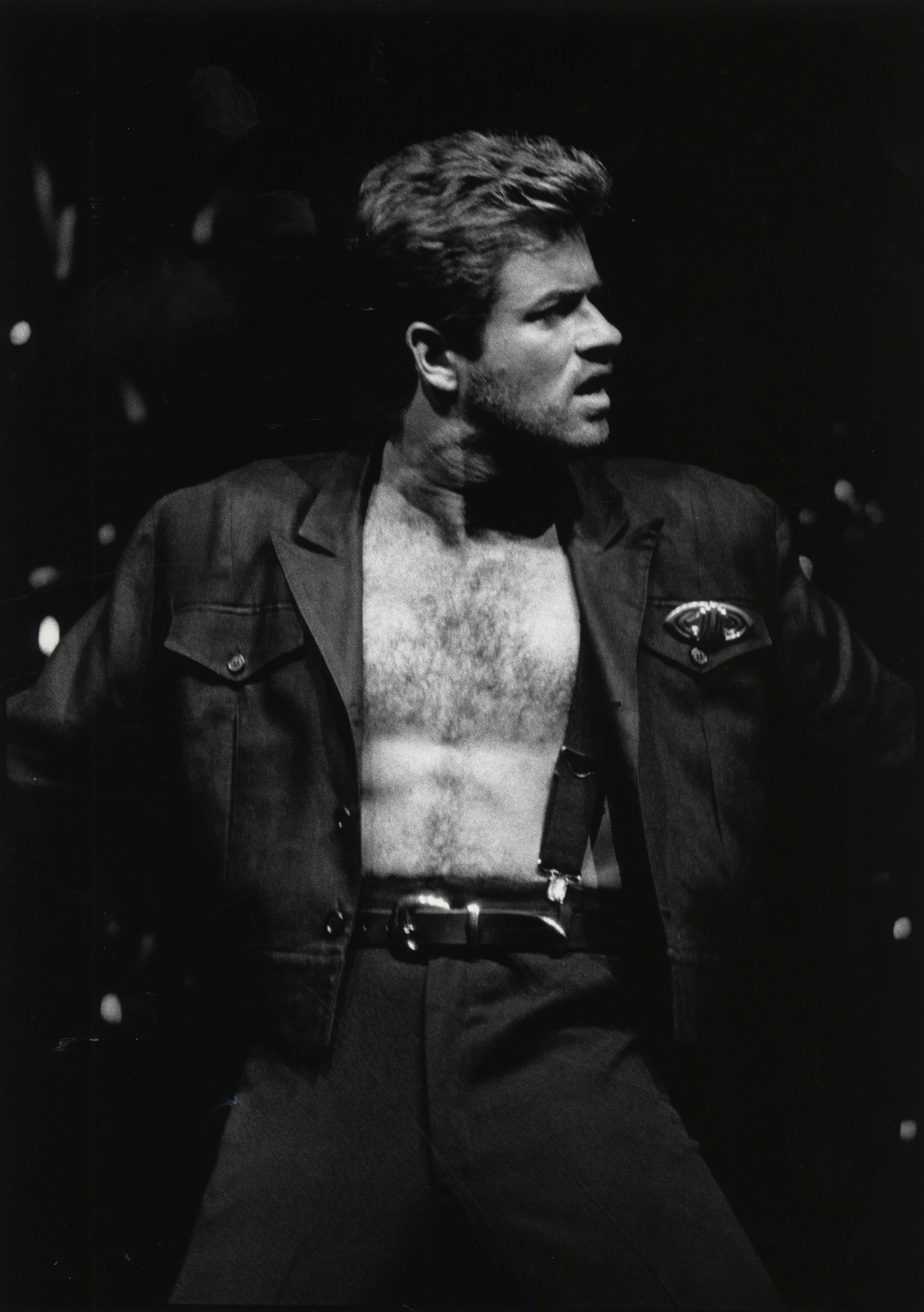
- Michael onstage during the Faith Tour in 1988
- Studio albums: 5
- Extended plays: 1
- Live albums: 2
- Compilation albums: 2
- Singles: 44
- Promotional singles: 8
- Video albums: 5
- Music videos: 36

The English singer-songwriter George Michael released five studio albums, two compilation albums, two live albums, one extended play, 44 singles, eight promotional singles, 36 music videos, and five video albums. In his career, Michael sold an estimated 100 million to 125 million records worldwide, making him one of the world's best-selling artists of all time.

Michael's debut solo album, Faith, was released by Columbia Records in the United States and sibling label Epic Records in the United Kingdom in late 1987. It included the singles "I Want Your Sex", "Faith" (the Billboard Hot 100 year-end number-one single of 1988 in the United States), "Father Figure", "One More Try", "Monkey" and "Kissing a Fool". The album peaked at number one in the UK Albums Chart, and was certified 4× Platinum by the British Phonographic Industry (BPI). It also peaked at number one on the US Billboard 200 and was certified Diamond for sales of over 10 million copies. Also in 1987, Michael collaborated with Aretha Franklin on the UK and US number one single "I Knew You Were Waiting (For Me)". In September 1990, Michael released his second album, Listen Without Prejudice Vol. 1, which peaked at number one in the UK, number two in the US, and was certified 4× Platinum by the BPI. The album spawned the singles "Praying for Time", "Waiting for That Day", "Freedom! '90", "Heal the Pain", "Cowboys and Angels" and "Soul Free".

In November 1991, Michael released "Don't Let the Sun Go Down on Me", a duet with Elton John; it reached number one in the UK and US. In 1992, Michael recorded "Too Funky", for the charity project Red Hot + Dance; the song reached number four in the UK and number ten in the US. In 1993, Michael released his version of "Somebody to Love", which was performed at the Freddie Mercury Tribute Concert with Queen. It debuted at number one in the UK and was certified Gold. In early 1996, Michael released "Jesus to a Child", a UK number-one single. The follow-up, "Fastlove", also peaked at number one in the UK. Following "Fastlove", the album Older was released, in May 1996. Other singles from the album included "Spinning the Wheel", "Star People '97" and the double A-sides "Older" / "I Can't Make You Love Me" and "You Have Been Loved" / "The Strangest Thing '97". All of these reached the UK top three. Michael released his first greatest hits collection, Ladies & Gentlemen: The Best of George Michael, in November 1998; it contained the new songs "Outside" and "As", a duet with Mary J. Blige. The album was Michael's most successful in the UK, reaching number one and it was certified 9× Platinum.

Michael's fourth solo album, Songs from the Last Century, was released in December 1999 and included cover versions of popular songs. His next album, Patience, was released in March 2004 and peaked at number one in the UK. Twenty Five, released in 2006, was Michael's second greatest hits album, celebrating the 25th anniversary of his music career. It debuted at number one in the UK. The album contains songs mainly from Michael's solo career and two new songs: "An Easier Affair" and "This Is Not Real Love" (a duet with Mutya Buena, a member of the Sugababes). In December 2008, Michael released a new track "December Song (I Dreamed of Christmas)" on his website for free. The following year, "December Song (I Dreamed of Christmas)" was officially released as a commercial single. This was followed by "True Faith" (which was a UK top 30 and Irish top 40 hit, and an extensive re-working of the New Order song); and "You and I", another charity single. His next single was "White Light", and it was a commercial success, reaching number 15 on the UK singles chart. The song has also charted in Belgium, Germany, the Netherlands, and Switzerland.

== Albums ==
=== Studio albums ===
List of albums, with selected chart positions and certifications
| Title | Details | Peak chart positions | | | | | | | | | | Sales | Certifications |
| Title | Details | UK | AUS | AUT | FRA | GER | IRE | NLD | SWE | SWI | US | Sales | Certifications |
|---|---|---|---|---|---|---|---|---|---|---|---|---|---|
| Faith | Released: 30 October 1987; Label: Epic (#460000); Formats: CD, CS, LP, MD | 1 | 3 | 3 | 52 (Note: Chart position of 2011 remastered release) | 3 | 52 | 1 | 4 | 4 | 1 | WW: 20,000,000; UK: 1,300,000 | BPI: 4× Platinum; ARIA: 5× Platinum; BVMI: Gold; GLF: Gold; IFPI SWI: 2× Platinum; NVPI: Platinum; RIAA: Diamond; SNEP: 2× Platinum |
| Listen Without Prejudice Vol. 1 | Released: 3 September 1990; Label: Epic (#467295); Formats: CD, CS, LP, MD, DCC | 1 | 2 | 5 | 2 | 7 | 3 | 2 | 3 | 3 | 2 | WW: 8,000,000; UK: 1,412,663 | BPI: 4× Platinum; ARIA: 2× Platinum; BVMI: Gold; GLF: Platinum; IFPI AUT: Gold; IFPI SWI: Platinum; NVPI: Platinum; RIAA: 2× Platinum; SNEP: Platinum |
| Older | Released: 13 May 1996; Label: Virgin (#V2802); Formats: CD, CS, LP, MD | 1 | 1 | 1 | 1 | 3 | 2 | 1 | 1 | 2 | 6 | UK: 1,800,000; US: 881,000 | BPI: 6× Platinum; ARIA: 2× Platinum; BVMI: Platinum; GLF: Gold; IFPI AUT: Gold; IFPI SWI: Platinum; NVPI: Platinum; RIAA: Platinum; SNEP: 2× Gold |
| Songs from the Last Century | Released: 6 December 1999; Label: Virgin (#V2920); Formats: CD, CS, MD | 2 | 12 | 12 | 7 | 4 | 7 | 6 | 16 | 6 | 157 | WW: 3,600,000; UK: 600,000; US: 152,000 | BPI: 2× Platinum; ARIA: Gold; BVMI: Gold; IFPI SWI: Gold; SNEP: 2× Gold |
| Patience | Released: 15 March 2004; Label: Sony Music (#515402-2); Formats: CD, digital download | 1 | 2 | 3 | 4 | 1 | 2 | 1 | 1 | 2 | 12 | WW: 4,000,000; UK: 700,000; US: 381,000 | BPI: 2× Platinum; ARIA: Platinum; BVMI: Platinum; GLF: Gold; IFPI AUT: Gold; IFPI SWI: Gold; NVPI: Gold; SNEP: Gold |

=== Live albums ===
| Title | Details | Peak chart positions | | | | | | | | Sales | Certifications |
| Title | Details | UK | AUS | AUT | GER | IRE | NLD | SWI | US | Sales | Certifications |
|---|---|---|---|---|---|---|---|---|---|---|---|
| Symphonica | Released: 14 March 2014; Label: Virgin EMI; Formats: Blu-ray Audio, CD, digital download, LP | 1 | 11 | 7 | 6 | 1 | 2 | 6 | 60 | UK: 200,000 | BPI: Gold |
| The Faith Tour | Released: 6 November 2026; Label: Sony Music; Formats: CD, LP, Blu-ray audio, digital | 7 | 44 | 6 | 5 | 29 | 13 | 7 | — | | |
"—" denotes a recording that did not chart.

=== Compilation albums ===
| Title | Details | Peak chart positions | | | | | | | | | Sales | Certifications |
| Title | Details | UK | AUS | AUT | GER | IRE | NLD | SWE | SWI | US | Sales | Certifications |
|---|---|---|---|---|---|---|---|---|---|---|---|---|
| Ladies & Gentlemen: The Best of George Michael | Released: 9 November 1998; Label: Epic (#491705); Formats: CD, MD, CS | 1 | 2 | 2 | 3 | 1 | 2 | 2 | 5 | 24 | WW: 9,000,000; US: 1,100,000; UK: 2,500,000 | BPI: 9× Platinum; ARIA: 7× Platinum; BVMI: 3× Gold; GLF: Platinum; IFPI AUT: Platinum; IFPI SWI: Platinum; NVPI: 2× Platinum; RIAA: 2× Platinum; SNEP: 2× Platinum |
| Twenty Five | Released: 11 November 2006; Label: Sony BMG (#88697009002); Formats: CD, digital download | 1 | 9 | 19 | 13 | 3 | 2 | 3 | 2 | 12 | UK: 900,000 | BPI: 5× Platinum; ARIA: 2× Platinum; BVMI: Gold; IFPI SWI: Platinum; IRMA: 3× Platinum; SNEP: Gold |
"—" denotes a recording that did not chart or was not released in that territory.

=== Video albums ===
| Title | Details | Certifications |
|---|---|---|
| Faith | Released: 9 August 1988; Label: CMV Enterprises; Format: VHS | RIAA: 2× Platinum |
| George Michael | Released: 5 November 1990; Label: CMV Enterprises; Format: VHS | RIAA: Platinum |
| Ladies & Gentlemen: The Best of George Michael | Released: 29 November 1999; Label: SMV Enterprises; Format: DVD, VHS | ARIA: 3× Platinum; ABPD: Gold |
| Twenty Five | Released: 13 November 2006; Label: Sony BMG; Format: DVD | ARIA: 2× Platinum |
| Live in London | Released: 7 December 2009; Label: Sony Music; Format: DVD, Blu-ray | ARIA: 2× Platinum; BPI: Platinum |

== Extended plays ==
| Title | Details | Peak chart positions | | | | | | | | | | Sales | Certifications |
| Title | Details | AUS | AUT | CAN | FRA | GER | IRE | NLD | SWE | SWI | US | Sales | Certifications |
|---|---|---|---|---|---|---|---|---|---|---|---|---|---|
| Five Live (with Queen and Lisa Stansfield) (Note: In some markets (such as the United Kingdom), Five Live charted as a single, not an EP.) | Released: 19 April 1993; Label: Parlophone (#0777-7- 89418-2-8); Formats: CD, CS, LP | 17 | 2 | 32 | 12 | 8 | 1 | 2 | 45 | 6 | 46 | US: 358,000 | BPI: Gold; BVMI: Gold; IFPI SWI: Gold; NVPI: Platinum; SNEP: Gold |

== Singles ==
List of singles, with selected chart positions and certifications, showing year released and album name
| Title | Year | Peak chart positions | | | | | | | | | | Certifications | Album |
| Title | Year | UK | AUS | AUT | FRA | GER | IRE | NLD | SWE | SWI | US | Certifications | Album |
|---|---|---|---|---|---|---|---|---|---|---|---|---|---|
| "Careless Whisper" (Note: "Careless Whisper" is sometimes credited to "Wham!", or "Wham! featuring George Michael".) | 1984 | 1 | 1 | 2 | 3 | 3 | 1 | 1 | 2 | 1 | 1 | BPI: 3× Platinum; ARIA: 2× Platinum; RIAA: 7× Platinum; SNEP: Silver | Make It Big |
| "A Different Corner" | 1986 | 1 | 4 | 6 | 16 | 7 | 2 | 2 | 18 | 3 | 7 | BPI: Gold | Music from the Edge of Heaven |
| "I Knew You Were Waiting (For Me)" (with Aretha Franklin) | 1987 | 1 | 1 | 9 | — | 5 | 1 | 1 | 4 | 5 | 1 | BPI: Platinum; ARIA: Gold | Aretha |
| "I Want Your Sex" | 1987 | 3 | 2 | 2 | 11 | 3 | 1 | 1 | 8 | 4 | 2 | RIAA: Platinum | Faith |
| "Faith" | 1987 | 2 | 1 | 4 | 22 | 5 | 2 | 1 | 9 | 4 | 1 | BPI: 2× Platinum; ARIA: 2× Platinum; RIAA: Gold | Faith |
| "Hard Day" | 1987 | — | — | — | — | — | — | — | — | — | — | | Faith |
| "Father Figure" | 1988 | 11 | 5 | 17 | 37 | 18 | 2 | 2 | — | 13 | 1 | BPI: Platinum; ARIA: Gold | Faith |
| "One More Try" | 1988 | 8 | 34 | 19 | 5 | 22 | 1 | 4 | 4 | 4 | 1 | RIAA: Gold; SNEP: Silver; BPI: Silver | Faith |
| "Monkey" | 1988 | 13 | 12 | 22 | 34 | 24 | 8 | 7 | — | 5 | 1 | | Faith |
| "Kissing a Fool" | 1988 | 18 | 55 | — | 45 | 44 | 9 | 13 | — | — | 5 | | Faith |
| "Praying for Time" | 1990 | 6 | 16 | 20 | 19 | 19 | 3 | 11 | 9 | 6 | 1 | BPI: Silver | Listen Without Prejudice Vol. 1 |
| "Waiting for That Day" | 1990 | 23 | 50 | — | — | — | 11 | 79 | — | — | 27 | | Listen Without Prejudice Vol. 1 |
| "Freedom! '90" | 1990 | 28 | 18 | 25 | 23 | 41 | 17 | 15 | 20 | — | 8 | BPI: Platinum; ARIA: Platinum; RIAA: Gold | Listen Without Prejudice Vol. 1 |
| "Heal the Pain" (original version) | 1991 | 31 | — | — | — | — | 16 | 16 | — | — | — | | Listen Without Prejudice Vol. 1 |
| "Cowboys and Angels" | 1991 | 45 | 164 | — | 36 | — | 15 | 15 | — | — | — | BPI: Silver | Listen Without Prejudice Vol. 1 |
| "Soul Free" (Note: "Soul Free" was released commercially in Australia, Japan and North America only.) | 1991 | — | 95 | — | — | — | — | — | — | — | — | | Listen Without Prejudice Vol. 1 |
| "Don't Let the Sun Go Down on Me" (with Elton John) | 1991 | 1 | 3 | 2 | 1 | 4 | 2 | 1 | 2 | 1 | 1 | BPI: Platinum; ARIA: Platinum; RIAA: Gold; SNEP: Silver | Duets |
| "Too Funky" | 1992 | 4 | 3 | 9 | 5 | 12 | 5 | 3 | 7 | 6 | 10 | ARIA: Platinum; RIAA: Gold | Red Hot + Dance |
| "Somebody to Love" (with Queen) | 1993 | 1 | 19 | 15 | 16 | 21 | 1 | 6 | — | — | 30 | BPI: Silver | Five Live EP |
| "Killer / Papa Was a Rollin' Stone" | 1993 | — | — | — | 197 | — | 1 | — | — | — | 69 | | Five Live EP |
| "Jesus to a Child" | 1996 | 1 | 1 | 11 | 7 | 12 | 1 | 2 | 2 | 4 | 7 | BPI: Platinum; ARIA: Platinum; RIAA: Gold; SNEP: Gold | Older |
| "Fastlove" | 1996 | 1 | 1 | 13 | 10 | 25 | 5 | 12 | 7 | 13 | 8 | BPI: Platinum; ARIA: Platinum; RIAA: Gold; SNEP: Gold | Older |
| "Spinning the Wheel" | 1996 | 2 | 14 | 29 | — | 67 | 14 | 24 | 18 | 24 | — | BPI: Silver | Older |
| "Older" / "I Can't Make You Love Me" | 1997 | 3 | 61 | — | — | — | 6 | 46 | 60 | — | — | BPI: Silver | Older |
| "Star People '97" | 1997 | 2 | 51 | 37 | — | 64 | 7 | 40 | 37 | 28 | — (Note: "Star People '97" did not enter the Billboard Hot 100, but peaked at number one on the Bubbling Under Hot 100 Singles chart.) | BPI: Silver | Older |
| "Waltz Away Dreaming" (with Toby Bourke) | 1997 | 10 | — | — | — | — | — | — | — | — | — | | Room 21 |
| "You Have Been Loved" | 1997 | 2 | 75 | — | — | — | 11 | 44 | 53 | — | — | BPI: Silver | Older |
| "Outside" | 1998 | 2 | 13 | 17 | 26 | 30 | 7 | 14 | 15 | 19 | — | BPI: Gold; ARIA: Gold | Ladies & Gentlemen: The Best of George Michael |
| "As" (featuring Mary J. Blige) | 1999 | 4 | 45 | — | 27 | 38 | 12 | 9 | 27 | 22 | — | BPI: Gold | Ladies & Gentlemen: The Best of George Michael |
| "If I Told You That" (with Whitney Houston) | 2000 | 9 | 37 | — | — | 58 | 25 | 31 | 44 | 33 | — | | Whitney: The Greatest Hits |
| "Freeek!" | 2002 | 7 | 5 | 7 | 7 | 7 | 14 | 12 | 26 | 2 | — | ARIA: Gold | Patience |
| "Shoot the Dog" | 2002 | 12 | 36 | 41 | 59 | 44 | 23 | 26 | 39 | 14 | — | | Patience |
| "Amazing" | 2004 | 4 | 6 | 23 | 37 | 19 | 4 | 9 | 16 | 10 | — (Note: "Amazing" did not enter the Billboard Hot 100, but peaked at number eight on the Hot Singles Sales chart.) | BPI: Silver; ARIA: Gold | Patience |
| "Flawless (Go to the City)" | 2004 | 8 | 26 | 72 | — | 54 | 23 | 30 | — | 36 | — (Note: "Flawless (Go to the City)" did not enter the Billboard Hot 100, but peaked at number 22 on the Hot Singles Sales chart.) | | Patience |
| "Round Here" | 2004 | 32 | — | — | — | — | — | — | — | 55 | — | | Patience |
| "John and Elvis Are Dead" (Note: "John and Elvis Are Dead" was not eligible to chart due to UK chart rules at that time.) | 2005 | — | — | — | — | — | — | — | — | — | — | | Patience |
| "An Easier Affair" | 2006 | 13 | 36 | 58 | 87 | 44 | 20 | 37 | 23 | 28 | — | | Twenty Five |
| "This Is Not Real Love" (featuring Mutya Buena) | 2006 | 15 | — | 62 | — | — | 27 | 32 | — | 36 | — | | Twenty Five |
| "December Song (I Dreamed of Christmas)" (Note: "December Song (I Dreamed of Christmas)" was originally released as a free download in December 2008 and was not eligible to chart, but was re-released as a paid download in December 2009, and therefore became eligible.) | 2008 | 14 | — | 63 | — | 37 | 40 | 18 | 43 | — | — | | Non-album singles |
| "True Faith" | 2011 | 27 | — | — | — | — | — | 38 | — | — | — | | Non-album singles |
| "White Light" | 2012 | 15 | 88 | 53 | 73 | 21 | 32 | 6 | — | 34 | — | | Non-album singles |
| "Let Her Down Easy" | 2014 | 53 | — | — | — | — | — | — | — | — | — | | Symphonica |
| "Fantasy" (featuring Nile Rodgers) | 2017 | 85 | — | — | — | — | — | — | — | — | — | | Listen Without Prejudice / MTV Unplugged |
| "This Is How (We Want You to Get High)" | 2019 | — (Note: "This Is How (We Want You to Get High)" did not enter the UK Singles Top 100 Chart, but peaked at number 10 on both the UK Singles Downloads and Singles Sales charts.) | — | — | — | — | — | — | — | — | — | | Last Christmas |
| "Always" (with Waze & Odyssey, Mary J. Blige and Tommy Theo) | 2020 | — | — | — | — | — | — | — | — | — | — | | Non-album single |
"—" denotes a recording that did not chart or was not released in that territory.

=== Promotional or limited release ===
List of promotional singles, with selected chart positions, showing year released and album name
| Title | Year | Peak chart positions | Album |
| Title | Year | CAN | Album |
|---|---|---|---|
| "I Believe (When I Fall in Love It Will Be Forever)" | 1991 (Note: Promoted to urban radio in February 1992.) | 90 | Non-album single |
| "These Are the Days of Our Lives" (with Queen and Lisa Stansfield) | 1993 | — | Five Live |
| "You Know That I Want To" / "Safe" | 1996 | — | Non-album single (Note: Issued in support of the Spinning the Wheel EP.) |
| "Roxanne" | 1999 | — | Songs from the Last Century |
| "Miss Sarajevo" | 1999 | — | Songs from the Last Century |
| "Heal the Pain" (featuring Paul McCartney) (Note: Paul McCartney is often uncredited on "Heal the Pain".) | 2008 | — | Twenty Five |
| "You and I" | 2011 | — | Non-album single |
| "Going to a Town" | 2014 | — | Symphonica |
| "Feeling Good" | 2014 | — | Symphonica |

== Other charted songs ==
List of songs, with selected chart positions, showing year released and album name
| Title | Year | Peak chart positions | Album |
| Title | Year | US | Album |
|---|---|---|---|
| "Mother's Pride" | 1990 | 46 (Note: Peak position as of March 1991) | Listen Without Prejudice Vol. 1 |

== Other appearances ==
List of songs, showing year released and album name
| Title | Year | Album |
|---|---|---|
| "Turn to Gold" | 1984 | Turn to Gold |
| "The Last Kiss" | 1985 | Romance |
| "Nikita" | 1985 | Ice on Fire |
| "Wrap Her Up" | 1985 | Ice on Fire |
| "Learn to Say No" (with Jody Watley) | 1987 | Jody Watley |
| "Jive Talkin'" | 1987 | Outrageous |
| "Heaven Help Me" | 1989 | Spell |
| "Red Dress" | 1990 | Son of Albert |
| "Someday" | 1991 | Change |
| "Tonight" | 1991 | Two Rooms: Celebrating the Songs of Elton John & Bernie Taupin |
| "I'm Your Man" | 1995 | I've Gotta Have It All |
| "You Spin Me Round" | 1995 | Non-album single |
| "Chameleon (Shed Your Skin)" | 1997 | Smoke + Mirrors |
| "The Grave" | 2003 | Hope (War Child) |
| "Blame It on the Sun" (with Ray Charles) | 2005 | Genius & Friends |
| "How Do You Keep the Music Playing?" (with Tony Bennett) | 2006 | Duets: An American Classic |
| "We Are Cinderella" | 2021 | This Time Tomorrow |

== Remix and production credits ==
List of songs, showing year released, artist and album name
| Title | Year | Artist | Album |
|---|---|---|---|
| "Me or the Rumours" (The George Michael mix) | 1989 | Deon Estus | Spell |
| "Only You" (Laker Boy mix) | 1991 | Praise | Praise |
| "Someday" | 1991 | Pepsi & Shirlie | Change |
| "One Nation Under a Groove" (Note: Produced under the alias "Laker Boy".) | 1991 | Jay Henry | Non-album single |
| "Tripping on Your Love" (George Michael Metropolis mix) | 1991 | Bananarama | Pop Life |
| "Brother Louie" (Note: Produced under the alias "James Kennedy", the name of Michael's close friend Andros Georgiou's firstborn son.) | 1993 | Louie Louie | Let's Get Started |
| "We Are Cinderella" | 2021 | Sleeper | This Time Tomorrow |

== Music videos ==
List of music videos, showing year released and directors
| Title | Year | Director(s) |
|---|---|---|
| "Careless Whisper" | 1984 | Duncan Gibbins |
| "A Different Corner" | 1986 | Andy Morahan |
| "I Knew You Were Waiting (For Me)" (with Aretha Franklin) | 1987 | Brian Grant |
| "I Want Your Sex" | 1987 | Andy Morahan |
| "Faith" | 1987 | Andy Morahan |
| "Father Figure" | 1987 | Andy Morahan |
| "One More Try" | 1988 | Tony Scott |
| "Monkey" | 1988 | Andy Morahan |
| "Kissing a Fool" | 1988 | George Michael and Andy Morahan |
| "Praying for Time" | 1990 | Michael Borofsky |
| "Freedom! '90" | 1990 | David Fincher |
| "Don't Let the Sun Go Down on Me" (with Elton John) | 1991 | Andy Morahan |
| "Too Funky" | 1992 | George Michael and Thierry Mugler |
| "Killer / Papa Was a Rollin' Stone" | 1993 | Marcus Nispel |
| "Jesus to a Child" | 1996 | Howard Greenhalgh |
| "Fastlove" | 1996 | Vaughan Arnell and Anthea Benton |
| "Spinning the Wheel" | 1996 | Vaughan Arnell and Anthea Benton |
| "Star People '97" | 1997 | Milton Lage |
| "Older" | 1997 | Andy Morahan |
| "Waltz Away Dreaming" (with Toby Bourke) | 1997 | The New Renaissance |
| "Outside" | 1998 | Vaughan Arnell |
| "As" (featuring Mary J. Blige) | 1999 | Big TV! |
| "Roxanne" | 1999 | Joanna Bailey |
| "If I Told You That" (with Whitney Houston) | 2000 | Kevin Bray |
| "Freeek!" | 2002 | Joseph Kahn |
| "Shoot the Dog" | 2002 | 2DTV |
| "Amazing" | 2004 | Matthew Rolston |
| "Flawless (Go to the City)" | 2004 | Jake Scott |
| "Round Here" | 2004 | Andy Morahan |
| "John and Elvis Are Dead" | 2005 | Anthea Benton |
| "An Easier Affair" | 2006 | Jake Nava |
| "December Song (I Dreamed of Christmas)" | 2009 | M.I.E. |
| "True Faith" | 2011 | M.I.E. |
| "White Light" | 2012 | Ryan Hope |
| "Let Her Down Easy" | 2014 | Vaughan Arnell |
| "Fantasy" (featuring Nile Rodgers) | 2017 | —N/a |
| "This Is How (We Want You to Get High)" | 2019 | —N/a |
