= Twenty Five (video) =

2006 video by George Michael

Video by George Michael
- Released: November 2006
- Recorded: 1984–2006
- Length: 265:00
- Label: Sony BMG

George Michael chronology
Ladies & Gentlemen: The Best of George Michael (1998)	Twenty Five (2006)	Live in London (2009)

Twenty Five is a video album by the English singer-songwriter George Michael, issued on DVD in November 2006 alongside the release of his compilation Twenty Five. The set includes 40 promotional videos recorded over more than two decades, among them seven created with Wham!. Presented as a two‑disc collection, it covers different phases of Michael's solo career, his collaborations, and the visual approaches associated with his work during the 1980s, 1990s, and 2000s. The release formed part of a wider anniversary campaign marking 25 years since the beginning of his recording career.

== Background ==
In mid‑2006, Michael and his label prepared an audio and video retrospective intended to document his work with Wham! and his subsequent solo output. The video component was developed in parallel with the companion compilation album Twenty Five, with both projects structured to provide a chronological overview of his singles, collaborations, and visual style across the 1980s, 1990s, and 2000s. The DVD brought together material originally issued across various formats, including early Wham! clips, videos produced during his solo breakthrough, and later works created for his albums in the 2000s.

== Content ==
The two‑disc set includes 40 promotional videos recorded at different points in Michael's career, beginning with early clips created with Wham! and continuing through his solo releases in the 1980s, 1990s, and 2000s. The first disc centres on material from his early solo albums, while the second disc contains later singles, collaborations, and videos produced for his 2000s releases. Twenty Five was issued on DVD in November 2006 in conjunction with the promotional activities surrounding the compilation album of the same name.

== Track listing ==
=== Disc one ===
1. "Club Tropicana"
2. "Wake Me Up Before You Go-Go"
3. "Freedom"
4. "Last Christmas"
5. "Everything She Wants"
6. "I'm Your Man"
7. "The Edge of Heaven"
8. "Careless Whisper"
9. "A Different Corner"
10. "I Knew You Were Waiting (For Me)" (with Aretha Franklin)
11. "I Want Your Sex"
12. "Faith"
13. "Father Figure"
14. "One More Try"
15. "Monkey"
16. "Kissing a Fool"
17. "Freedom! '90"
18. "Don't Let the Sun Go Down on Me" (with Elton John)
19. "Too Funky"

=== Disc two ===
1. "Fastlove"
2. "Jesus to a Child"
3. "Spinning the Wheel"
4. "Older"
5. "Outside"
6. "As" (with Mary J. Blige)
7. "Freeek!"
8. "Amazing"
9. "John and Elvis Are Dead"
10. "Flawless (Go to the City)"
11. "Shoot the Dog"
12. "Roxanne"
13. "An Easier Affair"
14. "If I Told You That" (with Whitney Houston)
15. "Waltz Away Dreaming"
16. "Somebody to Love" (with Queen)
17. "I Can't Make You Love Me"
18. "Star People '97"
19. "You Have Been Loved"
20. "Killer/Papa Was a Rollin' Stone"
21. "Round Here"

== Charts ==
Chart (2006)	Peak position
Australian Music DVDs Chart	11
Belgian (Flanders) Music DVDs Chart	2
Belgian (Wallonia) Music DVDs Chart	4
Dutch Music DVDs Chart	4
Danish Music DVDs Chart	5
Irish Music DVDs Chart	1
New Zealand Music DVDs Chart	4
Spanish Music DVDs Chart	2
Swedish Music DVDs Chart	3

== Certifications and sales ==
Region	Certification	Certified units/sales
Australia (ARIA)	2× Platinum	30,000^{^}
Italy	—	12,000
France (SNEP)	Platinum	20,000^{*}
^{*} Sales figures based on certification alone.^{^} Shipments figures based on certification alone.
