= Ladies & Gentlemen: The Best of George Michael (video) =

Video by George Michael
- Released: 29 November 1999
- Recorded: 1984–1998
- Genres: Dance-pop; R&B
- Length: 165:00
- Label: SMV Enterprises

George Michael chronology
George Michael (1990)	Ladies & Gentlemen: The Best of George Michael (1999)	Twenty Five (2006)

Ladies & Gentlemen: The Best of George Michael is a video album by the English singer-songwriter George Michael, released on 29 November 1999 as a companion to the greatest hits album of the same name. It includes 23 music videos and an exclusive interview with Michael Parkinson.

== Track listing ==
1. "Outside"
2. "Fastlove"
3. "Spinning the Wheel"
4. "Freedom! '90"
5. "Killer"
6. "Papa Was a Rollin' Stone"
7. "Too Funky"
8. "Faith"
9. "I Want Your Sex"
10. "Jesus to a Child"
11. "Waltz Away Dreaming" (with Toby Bourke)
12. "Father Figure"
13. "Don't Let the Sun Go Down on Me" (with Elton John)
14. "Kissing a Fool"
15. "I Knew You Were Waiting (For Me)" (with Aretha Franklin)
16. "Somebody to Love" (Live) (with Queen)
17. "Monkey"
18. "One More Try"
19. "Star People '97" (Live from Unplugged)
20. "I Can't Make You Love Me" (Live from Unplugged)
21. "A Different Corner"
22. "You Have Been Loved" (Live from Unplugged)
23. "Careless Whisper"
- Interview with Michael Parkinson

== Certifications ==
Region	Certification	Certified units/sales
Australia (ARIA)	3× Platinum	45,000^{^}
Brazil (Pro-Música Brasil)	Gold	25,000^{*}
France (SNEP)	2× Platinum	40,000^{*}
Germany (BVMI)	Gold	25,000^{^}
United Kingdom (BPI)	4× Platinum	200,000^{*}
^{*} Sales figures based on certification alone.^{^} Shipments figures based on certification alone.
