= Live in London (George Michael video) =

2009 video by George Michael

George Michael - Live in London

Video by George Michael
- Released: 7 December 2009
- Recorded: 24-25 August 2008
- Venues: Earls Court, London
- Genres: R&B; pop; dance-pop
- Length: 133 minutes 191 minutes (Both discs)
- Label: Sony Music

George Michael chronology
Twenty Five (2006)	George Michael - Live in London (2009)	Symphonica (2014)

George Michael - Live in London is a live concert film and video release by the English singer-songwriter George Michael, detailing his two performances at London's Earls Court Exhibition Centre on 24 and 25 August 2008 as part of his 25 Live tour. It was released in the DVD (two-disc release) and Blu-ray (with DTS-HD Master Audio and Dolby Digital 5.1 multichannel sound) formats on 7 December 2009 in the United Kingdom, Europe and Australia, and on 8 December 2009 in the United States and Canada.

== Background ==
In 2006, George Michael embarked on his first tour in 15 years, 25 Live. The tour was Michael's first following the conclusion of the Cover to Cover tour in 1991. In 2008, Michael announced two special concerts entitled "The Final Two", which took place at the Earls Court Exhibition Centre in London on 24 and 25 August that year. Moreover, another two "final" concerts were announced in Copenhagen and Abu Dhabi.

== Content ==
The Live in London DVD was recorded and filmed during the two consecutive nights at the Earls Court on 24 and 25 August 2008, and reflects the final set list of the tour. The DVD is a mesh of the two shows, the differences between which can be seen at various times (e.g. the conga player changes between two different players during "Too Funky" and Michael can be seen standing in different places from shot to shot, as in the extended part of "Fastlove", once on the main stage, then a second later at the end of the catwalk stage extension, as well as during the intro of "Outside", once waiting behind the LED stage wall to open for Michael to walk through, then moments later he enters the stage from the right side, not using the door in the LED wall).

== Track listing ==
=== Disc 1 ===
1. "Waiting (Reprise)" (Michael)
2. "Fastlove" (Michael/Rushen/Douglas)
3. "I'm Your Man" (Michael)
4. "Flawless (Go to the City)" (Michael/Alexander/Wooden/Turnier/Matthew/Stumm)
5. "Father Figure" (Michael)
6. "You Have Been Loved" (Michael/Austin)
7. "An Easier Affair" (Michael/Cushnan/Ambrose/Flynn)
8. "Everything She Wants" (Michael)
9. "One More Try" (Michael)
10. "A Different Corner" (Michael)
11. "Too Funky" (Michael)
12. "Shoot the Dog" (Michael/Oakey/Burden)
13. "John and Elvis Are Dead" (Michael/Austin)
14. "Faith" (Michael)
15. "Spinning the Wheel" (Michael/Douglas)
16. "Feeling Good" (Bricusse/Newley)
17. "Roxanne" (Sting)
18. "My Mother Had a Brother" (Michael)
19. "Amazing" (Michael/Douglas)
20. "Fantasy" (Michael)
21. "Outside" (Michael)
22. "Careless Whisper" (Michael/Ridgeley)
23. "Freedom! '90" (Michael)

=== Disc 2 ===
This disc contains the following bonus features:

- Documentaries
  - "I'd Know Him a Mile Off!"
    - Produced by Lisa Johnson, Filmed and directed by David Austin. Made by G K Panayioutou.
- Bonus tracks:
  - "Precious Box" (Michael)
  - "Jesus to a Child" (Michael)
  - "The First Time Ever I Saw Your Face" (McCall)

== Credits ==
- George Michael – vocals
- Chris Cameron – musical director, keyboards, arranger
- Danny Cummings – percussion
- Lea Mullen – percussion
- Phil Palmer – guitars
- Andy Hamilton – sax, keyboards, EWI
- Steve Walters – bass
- Mike Brown – guitars
- Carlos Hercules – drums
- Graham Kearns – guitars
- Luke Smith – keyboards
- Shirley Lewis – backing vocals
- Jay Henry – backing vocals
- Lincoln Jean-Marie – backing vocals
- Lori Perry – backing vocals
- Sharon Perry – backing vocals
- Lucy Jules – backing vocals

== Charts ==
Chart (2009)	Peak position
Dutch Music DVDs Chart	2
New Zealand Music DVDs Chart	2
Spanish Music DVDs Chart	10
Swiss Music DVDs Chart	5
UK Music Videos Chart	3

Chart (2010)	Peak position
Australian Music DVDs Chart	1
Austrian Music DVDs Chart	9
Belgian (Flanders) Music DVDs Chart	2
Belgian (Wallonia) Music DVDs Chart	2
Danish Music DVDs Chart	2
Swedish Music DVDs Chart	10

Chart (2023)	Peak position
UK Music Videos Chart	1

== Certifications and sales ==
Region	Certification	Certified units/sales
Australia (ARIA)	2× Platinum	30,000^{^}
France (SNEP)	Gold	7,500^{*}
Germany (BVMI)	Gold	25,000^{^}
Ireland (IRMA)	Gold	2,000^{^}
United Kingdom (BPI)	Platinum	50,000^{*}
^{*} Sales figures based on certification alone.^{^} Shipments figures based on certification alone.
