= Ladies & Gentlemen: The Best of George Michael =

Greatest hits album by George Michael
- Released: 9 November 1998
- Recorded: 1984–1998
- Genre: Pop
- Length: 147:25
- Label: Epic
- Producer: George Michael

George Michael chronology
Older (1996)	Ladies & Gentlemen: The Best of George Michael (1998)	Songs from the Last Century (1999)

Singles from Ladies & Gentlemen: The Best of George
- 1. "Outside" Released: 19 October 1998; 2. "As" Released: 1 March 1999

Ladies & Gentlemen: The Best of George Michael is the first compilation album by George Michael, released on 9 November 1998. The collection of 29 songs (28 on the North American release) is separated into two halves, with each CD of the double set containing music of a particular theme and mood. The first CD, titled "For the Heart", predominantly contains Michael's hit ballads, while the second CD, "For the Feet", comprises mostly his popular dance tunes. A DVD release, also titled Ladies & Gentlemen: The Best of George Michael, followed in 1999, featuring 23 music videos from Michael's career. After his death in December 2016, it was revealed by Michael's friend Geri Halliwell on The One Show that all of the British profits from the album went to the charity Terrence Higgins Trust, of which Michael was a patron.

== Background and production ==
Ladies & Gentlemen is notable for containing a large number of compilation tracks and duets that have not previously appeared on a George Michael album, including his US and UK number-one duet with Aretha Franklin, "I Knew You Were Waiting (For Me)", previously available on Franklin's 1986 album Aretha; "Desafinado", the duet in Portuguese with Brazilian singer Astrud Gilberto; and the Elton John duet "Don't Let the Sun Go Down on Me", from John's 1993 album Duets. Most of the tracks are in their full, original album versions. "Careless Whisper" is the single version, "A Different Corner" was remixed for this compilation, "Fantasy" is the original 1990 version (not the "Fantasy 98" remix which appeared on the "Outside" singles in the same period). "I Want Your Sex" is presented as "Part II – Brass in Love" only, without the more widely publicized "Part I – Lust" section and "Monkey", which was included on the US and Japanese editions, is presented as the single version remixed by Jimmy Jam and Terry Lewis in the US edition.

Ladies & Gentlemen was released by Sony Music Entertainment as a condition of Michael severing his contractual ties with the label amid a great deal of acrimony and publicity prior to the release of Older in 1996. However, singles from Older do appear on this compilation. Michael would later return to Sony to release his 2004 album Patience.

== Singles ==
"Outside" was the first single from the album. The song was a humorous look at his arrest shortly before the release of the album for soliciting a policeman in a public restroom. "As", Michael's duet with Mary J. Blige, was released as the second single in many territories around the world. It reached number four on the UK Singles Chart. The track was left off the North American release of the album. There were rumours that Blige's label was uncomfortable with Michael being gay, but this is contradicted by Blige's embracing of her large gay fan base. Michael cited Blige's record company president for pulling the track after Michael's arrest for committing a lewd act.

== Critical reception ==
Professional ratings
Review scores
Source	Rating
AllMusic	4.5/5 stars
The Daily Vault	A−
Entertainment Weekly	B
Jam! Showbiz	4/5 stars
MSN Music	4.5/5 stars
The Rolling Stone Album Guide	3/5 stars

The album received critical acclaim from music critics. Stephen Thomas Erlewine from AllMusic gave the album four and a half stars out of five and wrote that while "listening to both discs in a row is a little exhausting" the album "comes close to being definitive." Richard John from Jam! Showbiz gave the album 4 out of five stars and said that "over the course of Ladies & Gentlemen, you really get a feel for the growth and progress in Michael's musical output" and conclude that "for fans of George Michael or quality pop-soul-funk-dance" the album "is a worthy purchase". Alison Bellach from The Daily Vault gave the album an A− and wrote that "the collection is amazing" and that she was "pleased to note that the album included "Don't Let the Sun Go Down on Me", a duet with Elton John recorded for the Duets album", but she complained about "the version of "I Want Your Sex" that was chosen" because according to her "the original was something I could laugh at or snicker about" and the chosen version "doesn't even afford the listener a standard melody."

== Commercial performance ==
In the United Kingdom the album opened at No. 1 on 21 November 1998 and stayed at the top of the chart for eight weeks, it dropped to No. 2 on 16 January 1999 and was present in the top 10 for 23 weeks. It remained on the chart for 119 weeks. It was certified 9× Platinum by the BPI on 11 January 2019 denoting shipments of 2.7 million units. The week following Michael's death, the album had a 5,625% surge in sales and streams and re-entered the UK Albums Chart at No. 8; two weeks later it moved to No. 4 and stayed there for two weeks. In 2017 alone, it was on the chart for 23 weeks.

In the United States the album debuted and peaked at No. 24 on the Billboard 200 with 50,000 copies sold during the week of 28 November 1998, the next week it dropped to No. 39 and remained on the chart for 27 weeks. It was certified 2× Platinum by the RIAA on 5 October 2000 for shipments of 2 million units. As of October 2006, the album had sold 1.1 million copies according to Nielsen SoundScan. The week after Michael's death, the album re-entered at No. 84 on the Billboard 200 with 11,000 units sold.

== Track listing ==
All tracks are written by and produced by George Michael, except where noted.

Disc one: For the Heart
No.	Title	Writer(s)	Original Album	Length
1.	"Jesus to a Child"		Older	6:49
2.	"Father Figure"		Faith	5:41
3.	"Careless Whisper" (7" version)	Michael; Andrew Ridgeley	Make It Big	5:00
4.	"Don't Let the Sun Go Down on Me"	John; Bernie Taupin	Non-Album Single	5:47
5.	"You Have Been Loved"	Michael; David Austin	Older	5:28
6.	"Kissing a Fool"		Faith	4:36
7.	"I Can't Make You Love Me"	Allen Shamblin; Mike Reid	"Older" Double A-side	5:20
8.	"Heal the Pain"		Listen Without Prejudice Vol. 1	4:46
9.	"A Moment with You"		New Recording	5:43
10.	"Desafinado" (with Astrud Gilberto)	Antônio Carlos Jobim; Newton Ferriera de Mendonça	"Older" B-side	3:19
11.	"Cowboys and Angels"		Listen Without Prejudice Vol.1	7:14
12.	"Praying for Time"		Listen Without Prejudice Vol.1	4:41
13.	"One More Try"		Faith	5:53
14.	"A Different Corner" (Single Edit)		Music from the Edge of Heaven (Album Version)	4:03
15.	"Waltz Away Dreaming" (with Toby Bourke; cassettes only)	Bourke; Michael	Non-Album Single	4:44

Disc two: For the Feet
No.	Title	Writer(s)	Original Album	Length
1.	"Outside"		New Recording	4:44
2.	"As" (with Mary J. Blige)	Stevie Wonder	New Recording	4:47
3.	"Fastlove"	Michael; Patrice Rushen; Freddie Washington; Terri McFaddin	Older	5:31
4.	"Too Funky"		Red Hot + Dance	3:45
5.	"Freedom! '90"		Listen Without Prejudice Vol. 1	6:28
6.	"Star People '97"		Older (Original)	5:39
7.	"Killer/Papa Was a Rollin' Stone"	Adamski; Seal; Norman Whitfield; Barrett Strong	Five Live	4:16
8.	"I Want Your Sex" (Part II)		"I Want Your Sex" B-side	4:38
9.	"The Strangest Thing '97"		Older (Original)	4:41
10.	"Fantasy"		"Waiting For That Day" B-side	5:02
11.	"Spinning the Wheel"	Michael; Douglas	Older	6:09
12.	"Waiting for That Day"	Michael; Jagger–Richards	Listen Without Prejudice Vol. 1	4:50
13.	"I Knew You Were Waiting (For Me)" (with Aretha Franklin)	Simon Climie; Dennis Morgan	Aretha	3:58
14.	"Faith"		Faith	3:14
15.	"Somebody to Love" (with Queen)	Freddie Mercury	Five Live	5:23

North American second disc
No.	Title	Writer(s)	Original Album	Length
1.	"Outside"		New Recording	4:44
2.	"Fastlove"		Older	5:31
3.	"Too Funky"		Red Hot + Dance	3:45
4.	"Freedom! '90"		Listen Without Prejudice Vol. 1	6:28
5.	"Star People '97"		Older (Original)	5:39
6.	"Killer/Papa Was a Rollin' Stone"		Five Live	4:16
7.	"I Want Your Sex" (Part II)		"I Want Your Sex" B-side	4:38
8.	"Monkey" (7" Version)		Faith	4:47
9.	"Spinning the Wheel"	Michael; Douglas	Older	6:09
10.	"Waiting for That Day / You Can't Always Get What You Want"	Michael; Jagger–Richards	Listen Without Prejudice Vol. 1	4:50
11.	"I Knew You Were Waiting (For Me)" (with Aretha Franklin)	Climie; Morgan	Aretha	3:59
12.	"Hard Day"		Faith	4:54
13.	"Faith"		Faith	3:13
14.	"Somebody to Love" (with Queen)	Mercury	Five Live	5:24

Japanese second disc
No.	Title	Writer(s)	Original Album	Length
1.	"Outside"		New Recording	4:44
2.	"As" (with Mary J. Blige)	Wonder	New Recording	4:46
3.	"Fastlove"	Michael; Rushen; Washington; McFaddin	Older	5:30
4.	"Too Funky"		Red Hot + Dance	3:44
5.	"Freedom! '90"		Listen Without Prejudice Vol. 1	6:29
6.	"Star People '97"		Older (Original)	5:38
7.	"Killer/Papa Was a Rollin' Stone"	Adamski; Seal; Whitfield; Strong	Five Live	4:16
8.	"I Want Your Sex" (Part II)		"I Want Your Sex" B-side	4:37
9.	"Monkey"		Faith	5:06
10.	"Spinning the Wheel"	Michael; Douglas	Older	6:08
11.	"Waiting for That Day"	Michael; Jagger–Richards	Listen Without Prejudice Vol. 1	4:50
12.	"I Knew You Were Waiting (For Me)" (with Aretha Franklin)	Climie; Morgan	Aretha	3:58
13.	"Hard Day"		Faith	4:48
14.	"Faith"		Faith	4:16
15.	"Somebody to Love" (with Queen)	Mercury	Five Live	5:25

== Charts ==
=== Weekly charts ===
Chart (1998–1999)	Peak position
Australian Albums (ARIA)	2
Austrian Albums (Ö3 Austria)	2
Belgian Albums (Ultratop Flanders)	2
Belgian Albums (Ultratop Wallonia)	3
Canadian Albums (Billboard)	10
Danish Albums (Hitlisten)	1
Dutch Albums (Album Top 100)	2
European Albums (Top 100)	1
Finnish Albums (Suomen virallinen lista)	5
French Compilations (SNEP)	1
German Albums (Offizielle Top 100)	3
Hungarian Albums (MAHASZ)	1
Irish Albums (IRMA)	1
Japanese Albums (Oricon)	23
New Zealand Albums (RMNZ)	3
Norwegian Albums (VG-lista)	1
Portuguese Albums (AFP)	8
Scottish Albums (Official Charts)	1
Spanish Albums (PROMUSICAE)	4
Swedish Albums (Sverigetopplistan)	2
Swiss Albums (Schweizer Hitparade)	5
UK Albums (Official Charts)	1
US Billboard 200	24

=== Year-end charts ===
Chart (1998)	Position
Australian Albums (ARIA)	16
Belgian Albums (Ultratop Flanders)	8
Belgian Albums (Ultratop Wallonia)	14
Danish Albums (Hitlisten)	14
Dutch Albums (MegaCharts)	33
European Albums (Music & Media)	38
German Albums (Offizielle Top 100)	75
New Zealand Albums (Recorded Music NZ)	40
Norwegian Christmas Period Albums (VG-lista)	1
Swedish Albums (Sverigetopplistan)	37
UK Albums (OCC)	2

Chart (1999)	Position
Australian Albums (ARIA)	19
Austrian Albums (Ö3 Austria)	28
Belgian Albums (Ultratop Flanders)	27
Belgian Albums (Ultratop Wallonia)	18
Danish Albums (Hitlisten)	18
Dutch Albums (MegaCharts)	5
European Albums (Top 100)	8
French Compilations (SNEP)	3
German Albums (Offizielle Top 100)	12
New Zealand Albums (Recorded Music NZ)	18
Norwegian Winter Period Albums (VG-lista)	10
Swedish Albums (Sverigetopplistan)	80
Swiss Albums (Schweizer Hitparade)	45
UK Albums (OCC)	22
US Billboard 200	167

Chart (2000)	Position
Finnish Foreign Albums (Suomen virallinen lista)	100

Chart (2017)	Position
Australian Albums (ARIA)	88
UK Albums (OCC)	30

== Certifications and sales ==
Region	Certification	Certified units/sales
Argentina (CAPIF)	Gold	30,000^{^}
Australia (ARIA)	7× Platinum	490,000^{^}
Austria (IFPI Austria)	Platinum	50,000^{*}
Belgium (BRMA)	2× Platinum	100,000^{*}
Brazil (Pro-Música Brasil)	Gold	100,000^{*}
Canada (Music Canada)	2× Platinum	200,000^{^}
Denmark (IFPI Danmark)	10× Platinum	200,000^{‡}
Finland (Musiikkituottajat)	Gold	33,000
France (SNEP)	2× Platinum	600,000^{*}
Germany (BVMI)	3× Gold	750,000^{^}
Italy (FIMI)	Gold	25,000^{‡}
Netherlands (NVPI)	2× Platinum	200,000^{^}
New Zealand (RMNZ)	4× Platinum	60,000^{^}
Norway (IFPI Norway)	Platinum	50,000^{*}
Poland (ZPAV)	Platinum	100,000^{*}
Spain (Promusicae)	2× Platinum	200,000^{^}
Sweden (GLF)	Platinum	80,000^{^}
Switzerland (IFPI Switzerland)	Platinum	50,000^{^}
United Kingdom (BPI)	9× Platinum	2,700,000^{^}
United States (RIAA)	2× Platinum	1,100,000
Summaries
Europe (IFPI)	6× Platinum	6,000,000^{*}
Worldwide	—	9,000,000
^{*} Sales figures based on certification alone.^{^} Shipments figures based on certification alone.^{‡} Sales+streaming figures based on certification alone.

== See also ==
- Ladies & Gentlemen: The Songs of George Michael, an album by Anthony Callea.
