= Ladies and Gentlemen =

Ladies and Gentlemen may refer to:

- Ladies and gentlemen (salutation), a common introductory phrase

== Film and television ==
- Ladies & Gentlemen (2015 film), an Indian Telugu-language film
- Ladies & Gentlemen (TV series), a 2021 Bangladeshi drama series
- Ladies and Gentlemen (Comedy Showcase), a 2007 one-off British comedy special
- "Ladies and Gentlemen" (Master of None), a 2015 television episode

== Music ==
=== Albums ===
- Ladies and Gentlemen (Lou Bega album), 2001
- Ladies and Gentlemen (Marcia Hines album), 1977
- Ladies & Gentlemen: The Best of George Michael, 1998
- Ladies & Gentlemen: The Songs of George Michael, by Anthony Callea, 2014
- Ladies and Gentlemen: Barenaked Ladies and The Persuasions, 2017
- Ladies and Gentlemen... Mr. B.B. King, 2012
- Ladies and Gentlemen... The Bangles!, 2014
- Ladies and Gentlemen... the Grateful Dead, 2000
- Ladies & Gentlemen, by the Infamous Stringdusters, 2016

=== Songs ===
- "Ladies and Gentlemen" (song), by Saliva, 2006
- "Ladies and Gentlemen", by City and Colour from The Hurry and the Harm, 2013
- "Ladies & Gentlemen", by Short Stack from Stack Is the New Black, 2009

=== Videos ===
- Ladies & Gentlemen: The Best of George Michael (video), 1999
- Ladies and Gentlemen: The Rolling Stones, a 1974 concert movie

== Other ==
- Ladies and Gentlemen (play), a 1939 play by Charles MacArthur and Ben Hecht
- Ladies and Gentlemen (Warhol series) (1975), a series of paintings by Andy Warhol
- Ladies & Gentlemen, the company at the centre of the 2009 Enten controversy

== See also ==
- Ladies and Gentleman, a 2013 Indian Malayalam-language film
- Lady and Gent, a 1932 American film
- Lady & Gentlemen, a 2011 album by LeAnn Rimes
