= Cowboys and Angels =

Cowboys and Angels may refer to:

- "Cowboys and Angels" (George Michael song), from the album Listen Without Prejudice Vol. 1
- "Cowboys and Angels" (Dustin Lynch song)
- Cowboys & Angels, a 2003 film
