= Older (George Michael album) =

Studio album by George Michael
- Released: 13 May 1996
- Recorded: 1994–1996
- Studio: Sarm West (London)
- Genres: Pop; R&B; jazz fusion; soul
- Length: 58:56
- Labels: Virgin; Aegean; DreamWorks; Sony Music
- Producers: George Michael; Jon Douglas

George Michael chronology
Five Live (with Queen and Lisa Stansfield) (1993)	Older (1996)	Ladies & Gentlemen: The Best of George Michael (1998)

Alternative cover
- Older & Upper cover

Singles from Older
- 1. "Jesus to a Child" Released: 8 January 1996; 2. "Fastlove" Released: 22 April 1996; 3. "Spinning the Wheel" Released: 19 August 1996; 4. "Older" / "I Can't Make You Love Me" Released: 13 January 1997; 5. "Star People '97" Released: 4 March 1997; 6. "You Have Been Loved" / "The Strangest Thing '97" Released: 8 September 1997

Older is the third solo studio album by English singer-songwriter George Michael, released on 13 May 1996 in Europe by Virgin Records and Aegean Records. The American release, which occurred one day later, was the first album released by DreamWorks Records. It was Michael's first studio album since 1990's Listen Without Prejudice Vol. 1 – the five-and-a-half-year gap was due to the legal battle that Michael experienced with his former record company Sony Music. Michael dedicated two years to the recording of Older, and the album found him exploring new musical territories in a more serious fashion compared to his previous work.

At the time of release, the album was a huge commercial hit, particularly in Europe. In the UK, the album was particularly notable for producing a record six top three hit singles in a two-year span. The high sales of the album prompted a re-issue of the album, titled Older & Upper, eighteen months after the original release.

== Background ==
Following the release of Listen Without Prejudice Vol. 1 (1990), George Michael accused record label owners Sony Music of failing to promote the album as well as lacklustre support for his charity recordings (particularly contributions to the Red Hot AIDS Benefit Series) and requested to be released from his contract. A bitter legal battle ensued through the courts, ultimately resulting in a loss to Michael. During the court battle, Michael stated that he would refuse to release any new material through Sony under his name should he lose the lawsuit. Whilst essentially holding true to his word, Michael was not completely absent from the recording world during the six years between Listen Without Prejudice and Older.

After a huge hit with a live duet with Elton John on "Don't Let the Sun Go Down on Me" (that reached number one in both the UK and the US), Michael contributed several tracks to the charity album Red Hot + Dance in 1992 (with one song, "Too Funky", being released as a single and reaching worldwide top 10 positions). The same year, he performed live at the Freddie Mercury Tribute Concert at Wembley Stadium; in 1993, an EP of Michael's performances with Queen and Lisa Stansfield, entitled Five Live was released, and reached No. 1 in the UK.

== Musical style and composition ==
Older found Michael experimenting with new musical styles and expanding his artistic horizons. Particularly notable was the jazz flavour of the album's sound. The album marked a departure from the synthesised production of his previous projects, delivering a more organic sound with the inclusion of brass and strings. Michael was particularly inspired by the music of Brazilian composer Antônio Carlos Jobim. Another big influence was the album's producer, Jon Douglas, who has mixed several George Michael songs as B-sides. They first met when Douglas produced Lisa Moorish's version of "I'm Your Man" in 1995, to which Michael provided backing vocals. Michael and Douglas began to work together soon after, and they co-wrote "Spinning the Wheel" together and also co-wrote and produced "Fastlove". Douglas also played keyboards on those tracks. The album is dedicated to Jobim and Anselmo Feleppa, Michael's partner who died from AIDS-related complications in 1993.

Overall, the style of the album was melancholy, dark and sad. Michael complemented this departure making a dramatic change of his clothes, hair style and overall appearance. The long blonde hair, beard and jeans that Michael was known for during the late eighties were replaced with a buzz cut black hair and mostly leather clothes. Michael commented, on The Oprah Winfrey Show, about his new appearance:

"The way my image changed in Europe was that I looked very different, I had very short hair—I had really a kind of gay look in a way. I think I was trying to tell people I was okay with it [being gay], I just really didn't want to share it with journalists. The album I made in the middle nineties called Older was a tribute to Anselmo, really; there was a dedication to him on the album and fairly obvious male references. To my fans and the people that were really listening, I felt like I was trying to come out with them."

Michael grew back a longer hair style during 1998, as was first shown on the video he recorded for "Outside", premiered near the end of that year.

== Critical reception ==
Professional ratings
Review scores
Source	Rating
AllMusic	3/5 stars
Entertainment Weekly	C
The Guardian	3/5 stars
Los Angeles Times	2.5/4 stars
Music Week	5/5 stars
NME	9/10
Pitchfork	8.0/10
Rolling Stone	3/5 stars
Rolling Stone (Germany)	4/5 stars
Yahoo! Music UK	8/10 stars

Upon release, Older was met with widespread acclaim from music critics.

Stephen Thomas Erlewine from AllMusic website described Older as Michael's serious bid for artistic credibility, contrasting it with his earlier, more upbeat work. He notes a shift from catchy dance-pop to pretentious ballads, with even the dance track "Fastlove" lacking energy. While acknowledging Michael's craftsmanship, Erlewine criticizes the album's earnestness and argues that its melodies often fail to make an impact, leading to a lack of engagement.

David Browne from Entertainment Weekly observes that Older reflects Michael's struggles and quest for artistic maturity. He notes the album cover hints at a more introspective artist and describes the songs as melancholic, portraying Michael as a victim of his circumstances. While not deeming the album disreputable, Browne criticizes it for being tentative and bland, suggesting that Michael's recent experiences have led to music that resists emotional connection, making the album uniquely honest but joyless.

Elysa Gardner's review from Los Angeles Times critiques Michael's pursuit of artistic maturity, suggesting it has led to a decline in the album's quality. She finds many tracks uninspired and lacking emotional depth compared to his earlier work. While "Fastlove" and "Star People" maintain some charm, the ballads feel bland and weak. Gardner expresses concern that Michael's introspection may stifle his creativity, leaving fans missing his former vibrancy.

Paul Moody's review from NME highlights Michael's introspective shift, following a six-year hiatus since Listen Without Prejudice Vol. 1. According to him the somber album cover mirrors his mood, and the music combines sophisticated soul with reflective lyrics, and while tracks like "Fastlove" showcase a playful side, others, like "Jesus to a Child", convey deeper emotions. Ultimately, the reviewer commends Michael's successful transformation, awarding the album a 9/10 rating.

== Commercial performance ==
Older was a huge commercial success, especially in the European markets. In the UK the album debuted at No. 1 with 281,000 copies sold in its first week, becoming one of the biggest debuts ever in British history (it currently ranks as the 23rd fastest-selling album in the UK). At that point, it was Virgin's fastest-selling album of all time; it was later surpassed by the Spice Girls. It became Michael's biggest-selling album in his homeland, achieving over 1.8 million copies sold, and receiving a 6× Platinum certification by the BPI on 5 December 1997. In the UK, it spent a total of 147 weeks inside the top 200, 99 of them on the top 75, and 35 of them on the top 10 (including 23 consecutive weeks). The steady sales of the album were the result of good promotion market and the release of six hit singles throughout a two-year period. All of these singles (except for the one for the title track) were released and promoted as EP's, in two available formats, most of them containing previously unreleased material (including live tracks, alternate versions and, in the case for the Spinning the Wheel EP, two new studio recordings of brand-new George Michael compositions). None of these singles were promoted with live performances at Top of the Pops, only their music videos were played. All of this helped to push the album sales from one week to another, with the album usually returning to the top 10 in the British charts. For example, when "Star People '97" was released in mid-1997, Older achieved a 21–14–10–7 progression on the charts. Very much the same happened when "You Have Been Loved/The Strangest Thing '97" was issued as the sixth single (sixteen months after the original release of the album), and Older showed a 24–14–7 move on the UK charts. As of April 2019, Older was the 97th best-selling album of all time in the UK.

In the United States, however, the album somewhat stalled and was received with lukewarm success. There (and in Canada), the album release was particularly notable as it was the first album released by the now-defunct DreamWorks Records. Despite leading singles "Jesus to a Child" and "Fastlove" reaching the top 10 of the Billboard Hot 100, debut sales for the album were disappointing. The album debuted and peaked at No. 6 on the Billboard 200 the week of 1 June 1996 with 99,000 units sold, the next week it dropped to No. 9 and remained on the chart for 24 weeks, it was certified platinum by the RIAA on 21 August 1996 for shipments of one million units. As of October 2006, it has sold 881,000 copies in the US, according to Nielsen SoundScan. By February 1997, the album is said to have sold 5,000,000 copies worldwide, according to Billboard.

== Singles ==
Older was particularly notable for the release of its six singles. All of them reached the UK top 3, hitting a record for the most singles in the British top 3 released from a single album. At the time of release of the fifth of them, "Star People '97", chart specialist James Masterson noted Michael's success on the UK Singles Chart, writing: "Ironically enough denied by the very man who some say he is trying to emulate (Gary Barlow), George Michael nonetheless makes an impressive top 3 entry with this single. The Older album has now proved itself to be far and away his most commercially successful recording ever. Five singles now lifted and every single one has been a top 3 hit. Compare this with the two top 3 hits produced by Faith and Listen Without Prejudice's scant total of one top tenner and one single which missed the top 40 altogether. This sustained single success has, of course, been achieved with a little help from marketing tricks such as remixes – or in this case a new recording of the album track which gives it a much-needed transformation into a deserved commercial smash."

- "Jesus to a Child". The song had already debuted at the MTV European Music Awards in November 1994, and was used to raise £50,000 for the charity "Help a London Child" with Michael matching every listener's pledge on a pound for pound basis. After its official release, the song debuted at number one in the UK in January 1996 replacing Michael Jackson's "Earth Song" after six weeks at the top. "Jesus to a Child" was Michael's first number one single in the UK as a solo artist since "A Different Corner" reached the summit back in 1986. The single was certified Silver in the UK by the BPI, recognising over 200,000 copies sold. In the US the song was a hit, reaching number 7 in the Billboard Hot 100. (The RIAA awarded the single with Gold status just as the follow-up, "Fastlove", was released.) Two formats of the single were released, both including an instrumental version of the track "Older" (the sung version wasn't revealed until the release of the album five months later). The music video for the song found Michael lip-synching lyrics in front of a camera for the first time since the video for "Kissing a Fool" from 1988.
- "Fastlove". It was released in the UK on 22 April 1996 and debuted straight at number one, where it stayed for three weeks. It was certified Gold for over 400,000 copies sold. This was the first time that a George Michael album included two singles released before the album itself. The song includes a riff from the 1982 hit "Forget Me Nots" by Patrice Rushen (in this case sung by Jo Bryant). The track earned Michael the Ivor Norvello Award for most performed work in 1996. The single was released in two formats in the United Kingdom, and both included a revised dance version of "I'm Your Man" (entitled "I'm Your Man '96"), that was produced by Michael and Jon Douglas. The single premiered a "Fastlove Part II", linking the original song and the new version of "I'm Your Man" into one mix. The video for the song was one of Michael's most memorable, and won the MTV Europe International Viewers Choice Award at the MTV Music Video Awards in September 1996. The song reached number 8 in America, where it was certified Gold by the RIAA, and became his last single to appear on the Billboard charts to date.
- "Spinning the Wheel". It was released in the UK on 19 August 1996. It debuted at number 2; the single was kept off the top spot by Spice Girls' "Wannabe". It reached also Silver status. Also released in two formats, it was particularly notable for including (and being promoted for) two brand-new songs – "Safe" and "You Know That I Want To" – that were exclusive to the first CD.
- "Older" / "I Can't Make You Love Me". It was released in the UK on 13 January 1997. Due to its only-one-format release, it was the poorest-seller of all the Older singles, and also the one with the lowest chart position (number 3) (this poor commercial performance was despite being released after the post-Christmas session and the inclusion of new material). It stayed in the top 10 for one week, and slipped out the UK top 40 just three weeks later. The single was promoted as a double A-side with a previously unreleased recording of "I Can't Make You Love Me", and was counted that was in the UK Singles Chart. The song received airplay and was also available as a promo CD issued to British radios and clubs. The track was recorded live at Michael's MTV Unplugged performance at Three Mills Island Studios in London, on 11 October 1996 (the applause was edited out of the track, apparenting to be a studio recording). The single also included a live version of "The Strangest Thing", recorded live at the BBC Radio Theatre on 8 October 1996.
- "Star People '97". It was released in the UK on 28 April 1997. It reached number 2 there, kept off the top spot by Gary Barlow's "Love Won't Wait". "Star People '97" was a re-recording and remixed version of the album version of "Star People". The vocals were recorded soon after Michael lost his mother. The new recording incorporates extensive sampling from "Burn Rubber on Me" by the Gap Band. The single was released in two formats, featuring MTV Unplugged performances of Wham!'s "Everything She Wants" and "Star People". The single is noted for being the last official George Michael single to be released in the US, but it did not reach the charts there.
- "You Have Been Loved" / "The Strangest Thing '97". It was released in the UK on 8 September 1997. The final single issued from Older, it reached number 2 in the UK, where it was kept off the summit by Elton John's blockbuster charity single "Candle in the Wind '97". It was also released as a double-A sided single, with a remixed version of "The Strangest Thing". The song "You Have Been Loved" was a tribute to Anselmo Feleppa, Michael's lover who died from AIDS in 1993. Michael dedicated Older to both Feleppa "who changed the way I look at my life" and Jobim "who changed the way I listened to music."

== Awards and live shows ==
In 1996, Michael was voted 'Best British Male', at the MTV Europe Awards and the BRITs; and at The Ivor Novello Awards, he was awarded the prestigious title of 'Songwriter of The Year' for the third time.

At the beginning of October 1996, Michael performed his first live shows for five years with a gig for BBC Radio 1 followed by an Unplugged session for MTV. The Radio 1 audience consisted of just 200 people and the MTV Unplugged session slightly larger at 500. Both audiences included competition winners, some of whom had flown to London from all over the world, as well as various specially invited guests.

== Re-releases ==
The album was re-released on 1 December 1997 in a CD box set titled Older & Upper including two discs, both in gold (instead of the original black from Older):

1. the original album;
2. an extra disc, titled Upper, packaged in a cardboard sleeve with the same cover as the box (which was a close-up of Michael's green eye from the original Older album).

Alongside interactive elements, the Upper compact disc includes six tracks previously released on the singles from the album, notably featuring a version of "Fastlove (Part II)", only found on the second "Fastlove" promo single as "Fully Extended Mix – edit", differing both from the one included on the "Fastlove" single (running at 9:27) and from the edited version (4:39) included on the first "Fastlove" promo.

When released, Older & Upper was not listed in the UK charts as a different album than the original Older, and helped the album to jump from No. 65 to No. 36 during the competitive Christmas season.

The album received a remastered expanded edition reissue on 30 September 2022 from Sony Music and Michael's own label, Aegean Records, comprising the original Older album, the Upper disc and three bonus CDs, containing remixes and live recordings of Older-era tracks. The album charted at number 2 on the UK Official Albums Chart Top 100 on 7 October 2022.

== Track listing ==
All tracks written and produced by George Michael, except where noted.

Standard edition
No.	Title	Writer(s)	Producer(s)	Length
1.	"Jesus to a Child"			6:51
2.	"Fastlove"	Michael; Patrice Rushen; Freddie Washington; Terri McFaddin	Michael; Jon Douglas	5:25
3.	"Older"			5:33
4.	"Spinning the Wheel"	Michael; Douglas	Michael; Douglas	6:22
5.	"It Doesn't Really Matter"			4:50
6.	"The Strangest Thing"			6:02
7.	"To Be Forgiven"			5:21
8.	"Move On"			4:45
9.	"Star People"			5:16
10.	"You Have Been Loved"	Michael; David Austin		5:31
11.	"Free"			3:01
Total length:				58:57

Older & Upper – bonus disc
No.	Title	Writer(s)	Producer(s)	Length
1.	"Fastlove" (Part II)	Michael; Rushen; Washington; McFaddin	Michael; Douglas	4:56
2.	"Spinning the Wheel" (Forthright Edit)	Michael; Douglas	Michael; Douglas	4:42
3.	"Star People '97" (Radio Version)		Michael; Douglas	5:41
4.	"The Strangest Thing '97" (Radio Version)		Michael; Douglas	4:41
5.	"You Know That I Want To"	Michael; Douglas	Michael; Douglas	4:36
6.	"Safe"			4:24
7.	"Interactive elements" (Music videos for "Jesus to a Child", "Fastlove", and "Spinning the Wheel", as well as various internet links.)
Total length:				29:00

2022 expanded edition – includes three further discs
No.	Title	Writer(s)	Length
1.	"Fastlove" (A/C Summer Mix)	Michael; Rushen; Washington; McFaddin	4:45
2.	"Star People '97" (Radio Edit)		4:42
3.	"Freedom '94" (Live Version)		6:07
4.	"One More Try" (Live Gospel Version)		5:26
5.	"Star People" (Unplugged)		6:07
6.	"Spinning the Wheel" (Radio Edit)	Michael; Douglas	5:01
7.	"Fastlove" (Promo Edit)	Michael; Rushen; Washington; McFaddin	4:45
8.	"Jesus to a Child" (Special Radio Edit)		4:16
9.	"Spinning the Wheel" (Forthright Dub Mix)	Michael; Douglas	6:40
10.	"Star People" (Forthright Club Mix)		9:19
11.	"Fastlove" (Forthright Extended 12" Mix)	Michael; Rushen; Washington; McFaddin	9:21
12.	"Star People" (Forthright Dub Mix)		7:32
13.	"I'm Your Man" (The Jon Douglas Remix)		4:06
14.	"Fastlove" (Part II – Fully Extended Mix)	Michael; Rushen; Washington; McFaddin	9:32
15.	"Spinning the Wheel" (Forthright Extended 12" Club Mix)	Michael; Douglas	8:15
16.	"Star People" (Galaxy Dub Mix)		7:13
17.	"Fastlove" (Forthright Remix 7" Version)	Michael; Rushen; Washington; McFaddin	4:27
18.	"I Can't Make You Love Me" (Studio Version)		5:19
19.	"Desafinado" (with Astrud Gilberto)	Antônio Carlos Jobim; Newton Mendonça	3:22
20.	"The Strangest Thing" (Live)		6:05
21.	"Star People" (Forthright Radio Edit)		4:29
22.	"The Strangest Thing '97" (Loop Ratz Mix)		8:49
23.	"Fastlove" (Forthright Dub Remix)	Michael; Rushen; Washington; McFaddin	8:25
24.	"Jesus to a Child" (Radio Edit)		6:06
25.	"Spinning the Wheel" (The Jon Douglas Remix)	Michael; Douglas	6:41
26.	"Star People" (Galaxy Mix)		8:11
27.	"Older" (Instrumental)		5:21
Total length:			170:17

== Personnel ==
- George Michael – lead vocals, bass guitar, keyboards, drums, percussion, programming, arranger, producer
- Hugh Burns – guitar
- Danny Jacob – guitar
- Alan Ross – guitar
- John Themis – guitar
- David Austin – keyboards
- Chris Cameron – keyboards, strings
- David Clews – keyboards
- Nick Murdoch – piano
- Jon Douglas – keyboards, producer ("Fastlove", "Spinning the Wheel"), arranger ("Spinning the Wheel")
- Jo Garland – backing vocals
- David Clayton – programming
- Pete Gleadall – programming
- Steve McNichol – programming
- Stuart Brooks – trumpet, flugelhorn
- John Thirkell – trumpet, flugelhorn
- Steve Sidwell – trumpet
- Chris Davis – saxophone
- Phillip Smith – saxophone
- Andy Hamilton – tenor saxophone
- Fayyaz Virji – trombone
- Brad Branson – photography
- Charlie Brocco – engineer
- Paul Gomersall – engineer
- Chris Porter – engineer
- Ren Swan – engineer

== Charts ==
=== Weekly charts ===
Weekly chart performance for Older
Chart (1996–2017)	Peak position
Australian Albums (ARIA)	1
Austrian Albums (Ö3 Austria)	1
Belgian Albums (Ultratop Flanders)	3
Belgian Albums (Ultratop Wallonia)	2
Canada Top Albums/CDs (RPM)	3
Canadian Albums (The Record)	5
Czech Albums (ČNS IFPI)	3
Danish Albums (Hitlisten)	1
Dutch Albums (Album Top 100)	1
European Albums (Billboard)	1
Finnish Albums (Suomen virallinen lista)	3
French Albums (SNEP)	2
German Albums (Offizielle Top 100)	3
Hungarian Albums (MAHASZ)	1
Irish Albums (IRMA)	2
Italian Albums (FIMI)	2
Japanese Albums (Oricon)	3
New Zealand Albums (RMNZ)	1
Norwegian Albums (VG-lista)	1
Polish Albums (ZPAV)	11
Portuguese Albums (AFP)	1
Scottish Albums (Official Charts)	1
Spanish Albums (PROMUSICAE)	1
Swedish Albums (Sverigetopplistan)	1
Swiss Albums (Schweizer Hitparade)	2
UK Albums (Official Charts)	1
US Billboard 200	6
US Cashbox Top 200 Albums	3

Weekly chart performance for Older (2022 expanded edition)
Chart (2022)	Peak position
UK Albums (Official Charts)	2

=== Year-end charts ===
1996 year-end chart performance for Older
Chart (1996)	Position
Australian Albums (ARIA)	15
Austrian Albums (Ö3 Austria)	14
Canadian Albums (RPM)	15
Dutch Albums (MegaCharts)	26
European Albums (Top 100)	5
French Albums (SNEP)	12
German Albums (Offizielle Top 100)	19
Italian Albums (Hit Parade)	4
Japanese Albums (Oricon)	116
New Zealand Albums (Recorded Music NZ)	16
Norwegian Albums (VG-lista)	11
Norwegian End of School Period Albums (VG-lista)	3
Spanish Albums (PROMUSICAE)	4
Swedish Albums & Compilations (Sverigetopplistan)	21
Swiss Albums (Schweizer Hitparade)	11
UK Albums (OCC)	5
US Billboard 200	99

1997 year-end chart performance for Older
Chart (1997)	Position
Belgian Albums (Ultratop Wallonia)	83
Dutch Albums (MegaCharts)	26
European Albums (Top 100)	35
German Albums (Offizielle Top 100)	89
UK Albums (OCC)	13

1998 year-end chart performance for Older
Chart (1998)	Position
UK Albums (OCC)	121

== Certifications ==
Sales and certifications for Older
Region	Certification	Certified units/sales
Australia (ARIA)	2× Platinum	140,000^{^}
Austria (IFPI Austria)	Gold	25,000^{*}
Belgium (BRMA)	Platinum	50,000^{*}
Brazil (Pro-Música Brasil)	Gold	100,000^{*}
Canada (Music Canada)	2× Platinum	200,000^{^}
Denmark (IFPI Danmark)	7× Platinum	140,000^{‡}
France (SNEP)	Platinum	300,000^{*}
Germany (BVMI)	Platinum	500,000^{^}
Iceland	—	3,590
Italy	—	400,000
Japan (RIAJ)	Gold	201,970
Netherlands (NVPI)	Platinum	100,000^{^}
New Zealand (RMNZ)	Platinum	15,000^{^}
Norway (IFPI Norway)	Platinum	50,000^{*}
Poland (ZPAV)	Platinum	100,000^{*}
Spain (Promusicae)	2× Platinum	200,000^{^}
Sweden (GLF)	Gold	50,000^{^}
Switzerland (IFPI Switzerland)	Platinum	50,000^{^}
United Kingdom (BPI)	6× Platinum	1,800,000
United States (RIAA)	Platinum	1,000,000^{^}
Summaries
Europe (IFPI)	5× Platinum	5,000,000^{*}
^{*} Sales figures based on certification alone.^{^} Shipments figures based on certification alone.^{‡} Sales+streaming figures based on certification alone.
