= Anthea Benton =

British video director

- Occupations: television commercial and music video director

Anthea Benton is a British television commercial and music video director, best known for her adverts for Stella Artois and Levi's.

== Career ==
Benton began her career as a Fashion Designer and moved into directing in 1982 as half of the directing duo Vaughan and Anthea (with Vaughan Arnell). The two worked together for over a decade, initially concentrating on music videos, making a number of memorable promos in the burgeoning field including Dead or Alive's "You Spin Me Round (Like a Record)", Jamiroquai's "Space Cowboy", Take That's "Back for Good", Anggun's "Snow on the Sahara" and George Michael's "Fastlove" and "Spinning the Wheel".

In 1992 the duo moved into commercials, creating Wrangler's DJ commercial, the first European advert to feature young black urban culture. The duo's commercials won a large number of awards, with Levi's Creek picking up two prestigious D&AD awards for Best Direction and Best Commercial. Their work for Stella Artois launched the brands distinctive style of honouring European cinema, with its nod to Jean de Florette. Their second advert for Stella, Les Nouvelles Chaussures won that year's D&AD award for Best Direction.

Their work was defined by strong art direction, an awareness for fashion, and an ability to set trends, especially in terms of the music used. For Levi's Planet the duo selected a little heard track called Spaceman by Babylon Zoo. The track was to go on to sell 418,000 copies in a week, a record at the time, propelling it to number one in the UK singles chart.

In 1996 the duo decided to split, with both continuing to direct commercials and music videos. Benton went on to direct commercials for brands including Sony, T-Mobile, Audi, Levi's, Peugeot, Adidas, Hyundai and Barclaycard.

She continues to direct acclaimed work, recently working with actresses Anna Friel and Keeley Hawes in commercials for Pantene and Boots No7, respectively, and for House of Fraser, represented by Fresh Film. Featured in Shots magazine's list of the top 100 creative people, Benton is currently working on her first feature script.
