= Vaughan Arnell =

British music video director

- Born: 14 August 1961 (age 65); Chertsey, Surrey, England
- Occupation: Director
- Years active: 1981–present

Vaughan Arnell (born 14 August 1961) is a British music video and television commercial director. Although having done films for high-profile clients in the TV commercial field, including Nestlé and Levi's, he is best known for his directorial work for music videos, including George Michael's "Fastlove" (1996), Spice Girls' "Say You'll Be There" (1996), One Direction's "Kiss You" (2013), and Sam Smith and Normani's "Dancing with a Stranger" (2019). He is also a frequent collaborator of music artist Robbie Williams. With Anthea Benton, Arnell previously formed the directorial team Vaughan & Anthea.

== Videography ==
- Flex, Stranded In The Jungle 1982
- Flex, Androgny 1992
- Dead or Alive – You Spin Me Round (Like a Record) (1984) (co-directed with Anthea Benton)
- Dead or Alive – Brand New Lover (1986) (co-directed with Anthea Benton)
- Curiosity Killed the Cat – Down to Earth (1986)
- Terence Trent D'Arby – Dance Little Sister (1987)
- Julia Fordham – The Comfort of Strangers (1988)
- Terence Trent D'Arby – Wishing Well (1988)
- Terence Trent D'Arby – Sign Your Name (1988)
- The Pasadenas – Tribute (Right On) (1988)
- Matt Bianco – Good Times (1988)
- Associates – Fever (1990)
- Eros Ramazzotti – Se bastasse una canzone (1990)
- Propaganda – Heaven Give Me Words (1990)
- Soul II Soul – Move Me No Mountain (1992)
- Jamiroquai – Space Cowboy (1994) (co-directed with Anthea Benton)
- Take That – Back for Good (1995)
- George Michael – Fastlove (1996) (co-directed with Anthea Benton)
- George Michael – Spinning the Wheel (1996) (co-directed with Anthea Benton)
- Spice Girls – Say You'll Be There (1996)
- Tevin Campbell – Could You Learn to Love (1997)
- Jamiroquai – Alright (1997)
- Jimmy Ray – Are You Jimmy Ray? (1997)
- Robbie Williams – Angels (1997)
- Robbie Williams – Let Me Entertain You (1998)
- All Saints – Bootie Call (1998)
- Robbie Williams – Millennium (1998)
- George Michael – Outside (1998)
- Geri Halliwell – Look at Me (1999)
- 21st Century Girls – 21st Century Girls (1999)
- All Saints – Pure Shores (2000)
- The Charlatans – Impossible (2000)
- Robbie Williams – Rock DJ (2000)
- Texas – In Demand (2000)
- Texas – Inner Smile (2000)
- Robbie Williams – Supreme (2000)
- Robbie Williams – The Road to Mandalay (2001)
- Robbie Williams – Eternity (2001)
- Robbie Williams & Nicole Kidman – Somethin' Stupid (2001)
- Blazin' Squad – Crossroads (2002)
- Big Brovaz – Nu Flow (2002)
- Robbie Williams – Feel (2002)
- David Gray – Be Mine (2003)
- Big Brovaz – Baby Boy (2003)
- Robbie Williams – Radio (2004)
- Charlotte Church – Crazy Chick (2005)
- Will Young – Switch It On (2005)
- Robbie Williams – Sin Sin Sin (2006)
- Paloma Faith – New York (2009)
- Robbie Williams – Bodies (2009)
- Robbie Williams & Gary Barlow – Shame (2010)
- One Direction – Live While We're Young (2012)
- One Direction – Little Things (2012)
- Olly Murs – Army of Two (2013)
- One Direction – Kiss You (2013)
- John Newman – Love Me Again (2013)
- James Blunt – Bonfire Heart (2013)
- Olly Murs – Hand on Heart (2013)
- James Blunt – Heart To Heart (2013)
- George Michael – Let Her Down Easy (2014)
- The Script – Superheroes (2014)
- James Blunt – Postcards (2014)
- James Blunt – When I Find Love Again (2014)
- Elvis Presley with the Royal Philharmonic Orchestra – The Wonder of You featuring Kate Moss (2016)
- Robbie Williams – Party Like a Russian (2016)
- Robbie Williams – The Heavy Entertainment Show (2016)
- James Blunt – Love Me Better (2017)
- Rick Astley – Beautiful Life (2018)
- Sam Smith & Normani – Dancing with a Stranger (2019)
- Pet Shop Boys — Monkey Business (2020)
- James Blunt – Monsters (2020)
- James Blunt - The Girl That Never Was (2023)
- Take That - Sweet July (2026)

== Commercials ==
- Aviva – Name Change, I Am John
- BBC – If You Love Something
- BT – Getoutthere.com
- Carlsberg – Bank
- ClearScore – Ruby
- Dogs Trust – Corky
- Dreamcast – Shave
- Emirates – Tomorrow
- Eurostar – Cheese, Meeting
- Ford Focus C-Max – Metaphors
- Guinness – Free In
- Home Fire Action Plan – Get Out Alive
- Horlicks – Made For Evenings
- Hostelworld – Charlie Sheen
- House of Fraser – Bring Merry Back, The Blackout
- Ikea – Walkaway
- Impulse – Positive Thoughts
- Intel - Multiply
- Justerini & Brooks – Sol's Big Night Out
- Levi's – Creek
- Lexus – Make Waves
- Marks & Spencer – Christmas Wouldn't Be Christmas Without, Dinner, Everybody Dance
- Nescafé – Allotment, Ford Cortina, Wave
- Orange – Group Talk Plans
- Pepsi – Blue Card
- PokerStars – The Game
- Powergen – Boxes
- Range Rover LSE – Thoughts, Afterthoughts
- Rover 45 – Pinball
- Royal Air Force – Payload
- Samaritans – Buckaroo, Dino Hunt, Space Invaders, Table Football
- Sky – Treat Yourself
- Sky VIP – Something Special For Everyone
- Smirnoff – Reflection
- Starlight – Pool
- Stella Artois – Red Shoes
- The Sunday Times – Dury On Life
- Wrangler – DJ
