= Turn to Gold =

Single by David Austin

from the album Turn to Gold
- B-side: "Turn to Gold" (instrumental)
- Released: 21 May 1984
- Genre: Pop
- Label: Parlophone
- Songwriters: David Austin; George Michael
- Producer: George Michael

David Austin singles chronology
"Turn to Gold" (1984)	"This Boy Loves the Sun" (1984)

Remix cover
- 12" single sleeve

Licensed audio
- "Turn to Gold" on YouTube

"Turn to Gold" is a 1984 hit single by David Austin. It was co-written and produced by George Michael. Michael provides accompanying vocals on the song with Austin.

The song is the title track of a mini-album by Austin. Michael co-wrote and/or sang back-up on most of the LP's other songs. The album contained an extended remix of "Turn to Gold", which was also released.

"Turn to Gold" was released in Europe and Japan but not North America. It reached number 68 on the UK Singles Chart during the summer of 1984.

== Critical reception ==
In a review for No. 1 magazine, Karen Swayne described the song as "a bit Wham-my in a bold, brassy swinging funk kind of way".

== Charts ==
Chart (1984)	Peak position
UK Singles (OCC)	68
