= Waltz Away Dreaming =

Single by Toby Bourke with George Michael

from the album Room 21 and Ladies & Gentlemen: The Best of George Michael (cassette version only)
- B-side: "Things I Said Tonight" (live demo version); "Sunshine on Saturday"; "Love Is Not Faith"; "House of Love"
- Written: 1994
- Released: 26 May 1997; 1999 ('99)
- Recorded: March 1997
- Genre: Pop
- Length: 4:44
- Label: Aegean; Virgin
- Songwriters: Toby Bourke; George Michael
- Producers: Toby Bourke; George Michael

George Michael singles chronology
"Star People '97" (1997)	"Waltz Away Dreaming" (1997)	"You Have Been Loved" / "The Strangest Thing '97" (1997)

Music video
- "Waltz Away Dreaming" on YouTube

"Waltz Away Dreaming" is a song by Irish singer Toby Bourke and English singer George Michael. It was released as a single on 26 May 1997 in the United Kingdom, and later appeared on Bourke's 2000 album, Room 21. The song was a top ten hit, charting at number ten on the UK Singles Chart, and staying in the charts for four weeks. It remains as Bourke's only hit.

== Background and recording ==
"Waltz Away Dreaming" was written by Bourke in 1994, the year he and Michael first met. In 1996, Bourke was signed to Michael's newly launched record label, Aegean Records, and – at Michael's request – recorded a demo version of the song at a studio in Shepherd's Bush, London. The song was eventually recorded as a tribute to Michael's mother, Lesley Angold, who died on 26 February 1997. According to Bourke, "He [Michael] was utterly focused on this track. Lesley died on (Wednesday) and we were both in the studio on Saturday starting this."

The song was slightly remixed by Tim Hammill and released as "Waltz Away Dreaming '99" in Europe.

"Waltz Away Dreaming" has not appeared on any of Michael's studio albums. It did eventually appear in 1998 on his greatest hits album Ladies & Gentlemen: The Best of George Michael, but only on the cassette version. A music video was also made for the single.

== Critical reception ==
British magazine Music Week rated the song three out of four, describing it as "a low-key, folksy ballad written by the pair in tribute to George Michael's late mother. With plenty of profile, it could be a hit."

== Track listing ==
- UK CD (Aegean AECD01)
1. "Waltz Away Dreaming" – 4:44
2. "Things I Said Tonight" (live demo version) – 4:39
- French CD single (XIII Bis 6400990)
1. "Waltz Away Dreaming" (new version) – 4:44
2. "House of Love"
3. "Waltz Away Dreaming" (video clip)
- UK cassette single (Aegean AEMC01)

A-side

1. "Waltz Away Dreaming" – 4:44
2. "Things I Said Tonight" (live demo version) – 4:39

B-side

1. "Waltz Away Dreaming" – 4:44
2. "Things I Said Tonight" (live demo version) – 4:39
- Italian 12" The Remixes (Arcade LC-CODE 0160)

A-side

1. "Waltz Away Dreaming '99" (Mauro Davide club remix) – 5:50
2. "Waltz Away Dreaming '99" (B&A remix) – 6:40

B-side

1. "Waltz Away Dreaming '99" (ATM club mix) – 5:30
2. "Waltz Away Dreaming '99" (Soul Sweet) – 4:35
- Dutch, German and Italian CD "Waltz Away Dreaming '99"

(CNR 5300347 / Arcade ARC311 (Netherlands) / CNR ARC 1007–8 (Germany) / ICE 991001 CDS)

1. "Waltz Away Dreaming '99" – 4:46
2. "Waltz Away Dreaming" (original version) – 4:42
3. "Sunshine on Saturday" – 3:54
4. "Love Is Not Faith" – 5:09
- EU CD "Waltz Away Dreaming '99" (CNR 5300346)
1. "Waltz Away Dreaming '99" – 4:46
2. "Waltz Away Dreaming" (original version) – 4:42

== Charts ==
Chart (1997)	Peak position
Europe (Eurochart Hot 100)	92
Scottish Singles Sales (Official Charts)	19
UK Singles (Official Charts)	10
