= Cowboys and Angels (George Michael song) =

1991 single by George Michael

Single by George Michael

from the album Listen Without Prejudice Vol. 1
- B-side: "Something to Save"
- Written: March 1989
- Released: 18 March 1991
- Genre: Jazz
- Length: 7:14 (album version); 4:34 (radio edit)
- Label: Epic
- Songwriter: George Michael
- Producer: George Michael

George Michael singles chronology
"Heal the Pain" (1991)	"Cowboys and Angels" (1991)	"Soul Free" (1991)

Licensed audio
- "Cowboys and Angels" on YouTube

"Cowboys and Angels" is a song written and performed by English singer-songwriter George Michael, released on Epic Records on 18 March 1991 as the fifth single from his second solo album, Listen Without Prejudice Vol. 1 (1990). The song became the first single released by Michael to miss the top 40 of the UK singles chart, peaking at number 45. The album was released in September 1990; each single had finished lower than its predecessor and "Cowboys and Angels" continued the pattern, although the other four had all reached the threshold of the top 40. It was also Michael's longest single to date, at 7 minutes and 14 seconds.

The single release included the track "Something to Save" as a B-side. Some releases of the single also included a radio edit of the song, which omitted the 42-second piano intro and an entire verse from the album version.

== Composition ==
In a 2004 interview with Adam Mattera for UK magazine Attitude, Michael revealed that "Cowboys and Angels" was written about a short-lived love triangle where he was in love with a man while a female friend was in love with him, but none knew of the others' feelings: "She was in love with me because she couldn't get me, and I was in love with him because I couldn't get him... It's a very personal lyric, but it's about the ridiculousness of wanting what you can't have."

"Cowboys and Angels" is notable for being written in waltz time. The saxophone solo is performed by Andy Hamilton.

== Critical reception ==
James Brown from NME wrote, "This song is George Michael's finest 45 for years. A soothing, moving croon in the company of some gentle jazz bass and percussion and a strong arrangement that shadows GM throughout. Reminiscent of a film noir soundtrack as opposed to all that late '80s matt black lifestyle schmaltz he'd decided to become king of. By far the most sophisticated song of the week without even trying, and it never becomes boor-ish."

In 2021, "Cowboys and Angels" was included on The Guardian's list of George Michael's 30 greatest songs. Ranking the song 12th, reviewer Alexis Petridis stated that "its hazy and, more than likely, stoned take on orchestrated jazz-pop is utterly beautiful," with lyrics "surprisingly affectionate and generous, considering it's about a love triangle."

== Track listing ==
All tracks are written by George Michael.

CD maxi: Epic / 656774 5 (Europe)
No.	Title	Length
1.	"Cowboys and Angels" (edit)	4:34
2.	"Cowboys and Angels" (LP version)	7:14
3.	"Something to Save"	3:18

== Personnel ==
Personnel taken from Listen Without Prejudice Vol. 1 liner notes.

- George Michael – vocals, bass, percussion
- Chris Cameron – string arrangements, piano
- Ian Thomas – drums
- Deon Estus – introduction bass
- Andy Hamilton – saxophone

== Charts ==
Chart (1991)	Peak position
Australia (ARIA)	164
Belgium (Ultratop 50 Flanders)	26
Europe (Eurochart Hot 100)	92
Europe (European Hit Radio)	21
France (SNEP)	36
Ireland (IRMA)	15
Netherlands (Dutch Top 40)	15
Netherlands (Single Top 100)	20
UK Singles (OCC)	45
UK Airplay (Music Week)	18

== Certifications ==
Region	Certification	Certified units/sales
United Kingdom (BPI)	Silver	200,000^{‡}
^{‡} Sales+streaming figures based on certification alone.
