= Older (George Michael song) =

1997 single by George Michael

Single by George Michael

from the album Older
- A-side: "I Can't Make You Love Me"
- B-side: "Desafinado"
- Released: 13 January 1997
- Genre: Jazz
- Length: 5:35 (album version); 5:00 (radio edit); 5:18 (instrumental version)
- Label: Virgin; Aegean
- Songwriter: George Michael
- Producer: George Michael

George Michael singles chronology
"Spinning the Wheel" (1996)	"Older" / "I Can't Make You Love Me" (1997)	"Star People '97" (1997)

Music video
- "Older" on YouTube

"Older" is a song by English singer-songwriter George Michael, released in January 1997 as the fourth single from his third album, Older (1996). It was both written and produced by Michael, and also released as an EP under the name The Older EP. The single's other A-side is a cover of Bonnie Raitt's song "I Can't Make You Love Me". "Older" peaked at number three on the UK Singles Chart while becoming a top-10 hit in Denmark, Hungary, Ireland, and Spain. The accompanying music video was directed by British director Andy Morahan.

== Critical reception ==
Scottish Aberdeen Press and Journal stated that Michael follows up a triumphant 1996 with "one of his strongest ballads to date". The newspaper also wrote that it's a track "he obviously hopes will cement his maturing image." Sarah Davis from Dotmusic noted the "jazzy mood", "as Michael brusquely casts off a former lover—'I'm not the man you want... these are wasted days without affection, I'm not that foolish anymore'—to the quavering accompaniment of Steve Sidwell's trumpet." Elysa Gardner from Los Angeles Times called it "moody", noting the singer "addressing a lover" in the song.

A reviewer from Music Week gave "Older" a full score of five out of five, writing, "As smooth, soulful and jazzy a ballad as Michael has ever made, this silky song is coupled with the Bonnie Raitt track 'I Can't Make You Love Me'. A certain hit." Steve Morse from The Spokesman-Review described it as a "anguished love song". Ed Morales for Vibe wrote in his album review, that on the "affecting" title track, "Michael delivers his message of aging gracefully through a narrative detailing a breakup—one lover is crowding another. 'Change is a stranger you have to know', he says."

== Track listings ==
- Standard CD EP
1. "Older" – 5:35
2. "I Can't Make You Love Me" – 5:21
3. "Desafinado" (with Astrud Gilberto) – 3:22
4. "The Strangest Thing" (live) – 6:01
- UK cassette EP
1. "Older" (radio edit) – 5:00
2. "I Can't Make You Love Me" – 5:21
3. "Desafinado" (with Astrud Gilberto) – 3:22
4. "The Strangest Thing" (live) – 5:01
- European CD single
1. "Older" – 5:35
2. "I Can't Make You Love Me" – 5:21

== Charts ==
=== Weekly charts ===
Chart (1997)	Peak position
Australia (ARIA)	61
Denmark (IFPI)	10
Europe (Eurochart Hot 100)	25
Hungary (Mahasz)	6
Iceland (Íslenski Listinn Topp 40)	15
Ireland (IRMA)	6
Israel (Israeli Singles Chart)	14
Netherlands (Dutch Top 40)	29
Netherlands (Single Top 100)	46
Scottish Singles Sales (Official Charts)	6
Spain (AFYVE)	3
Sweden (Sverigetopplistan)	60
UK Singles (Official Charts)	3
UK Airplay (Music Week)	40

=== Year-end charts ===
Chart (1997)	Position
UK Singles (OCC)	85

== Certifications ==
Region	Certification	Certified units/sales
United Kingdom (BPI)	Silver	200,000^{‡}
^{‡} Sales+streaming figures based on certification alone.
