= As (song) =

1976 Stevie Wonder song

- French single cover

Single by Stevie Wonder

from the album Songs in the Key of Life
- B-side: "Contusion"
- Released: October 1977
- Genre: Soul; funk; jazz
- Length: 7:08 (album version); 3:27 (single edit)
- Label: Tamla
- Songwriter: Stevie Wonder
- Producer: Stevie Wonder

Stevie Wonder singles chronology
| "Another Star" (1977) | "As" (1977) | "Pops, We Love You" (1978) |

Audio video
- "As" on YouTube

"As" is a song written and performed by American singer and musician Stevie Wonder from his eighteenth album, Songs in the Key of Life (1976). The song was released in October 1977 by Tamla and reached number 36 on both the US Billboard Hot 100 and Black Singles chart. It gets its name from the first word of its lyrics. In 2019, Spin included "As" in their list of "The 30 Best Disco Songs That Every Millennial Should Know".

== Subject and interpretation ==
Wonder was injured in a car accident on August 6, 1973, and considered quitting the music industry as a result. He briefly relocated to Ghana in order to help underprivileged children and focus on humanitarian efforts, but eventually made a U-turn on his musical career. During his time in Ghana, Wonder gained a new perspective on life, finding a new love for humanity and the world around him.

The song implies that the love the singer has for their partner will never diminish, as they say that they will love them "always" (the song's main lyric) until the physically impossible becomes true. The impossible feats include: rainbows burning the stars out in the sky, oceans covering the tops of every mountain, dolphins flying, and parrots living at sea, dreaming of life and life becoming a dream, day becoming night and vice versa, trees and the seas flying away, 8×8×8 equaling 4, this day becoming the last day, the Earth turning right to left, the Earth denying itself (for the Sun), Mother Nature saying her work is through, and "until the day that you are me and I am you."

By the most straightforward interpretation of the lyrics, this is a lover serenading his beloved. By another possible interpretation, the song expresses the lyricist's own love for humanity. By another possible interpretation, Stevie wrote it from the perspective "As" if it were God speaking to all of humanity and/or creation.

== Legacy ==
In 2026, nearly 50 years after its release, the song was voted the greatest R&B song of all time by Essence, besting other R&B classics such as Tevin Campbell's "Can We Talk", Whitney Houston's "I Have Nothing" and Prince's "Adore".

== Personnel ==
- Stevie Wonder – lead and backing vocals, Fender Rhodes piano
- Nathan Watts – bass, handclaps
- Dean Parks – guitar
- Herbie Hancock – Fender Rhodes piano, handclaps
- Gerry Brown – drums
- Mary Lee Whitney – backing vocals
- Yolanda Simmons – backing vocals
- Dave Hanson, Yolanda Simon, Josette Valentino – handclaps
- unknown – tambourine

== Charts ==
| Chart (1977–1978) | Peak position |
|---|---|
| US Billboard Hot 100 | 36 |
| US Easy Listening (Billboard) | 24 |
| US Hot Soul Singles (Billboard) | 36 |

== Certifications ==
| Region | Certification | Certified units/sales |
|---|---|---|
| United Kingdom (BPI) | Silver | 200,000^{‡} |
^{‡} Sales+streaming figures based on certification alone.

== George Michael and Mary J. Blige version ==
"As"

Single by George Michael and Mary J. Blige

from the album Ladies & Gentlemen: The Best of George Michael and Mary
- B-side: "A Different Corner" (live)
- Released: March 1, 1999
- Genre: R&B; soul
- Length: 4:42
- Label: Epic
- Songwriter: Stevie Wonder
- Producer: Babyface

George Michael singles chronology
| "Outside" (1998) | "As" (1999) | "If I Told You That" (2000) |

Mary J. Blige singles chronology
| "Seven Days" (1998) | "As" (1999) | "All That I Can Say" (1999) |

Music video
- "As" on YouTube

British singer George Michael and American singer Mary J. Blige recorded a cover of the song, produced by Babyface, for Michael's first greatest hits album, Ladies & Gentlemen: The Best of George Michael (1998). The track was released as a single on March 1, 1999, as the album's second single and was later included on Blige's fourth album, Mary. "As" became a top-10 hit in Hungary, Italy, the Netherlands, Spain, and the United Kingdom.

Despite the song's success in Europe, it was not released as a single in the United States, nor was it included on the US versions of Ladies & Gentlemen or Mary. In an interview, Michael cited his much-publicized April 1998 arrest for "engaging in a lewd act" in Beverly Hills as the reason Blige's record company president, Jay Boberg, had blocked the track's US release, and urged fans to ask him "what his problem with George Michael is".

In 2019, Kirk Burrowes, who executive-produced Mary, confirmed Michael's account to Rated R&B. He stated: "[Boberg] did not want to let George Michael, who initiated that original production, use it as a single in the US to launch his greatest hits album. It pissed everyone off at Sony. It pissed George Michael off. It pissed everyone off, but we couldn't make Boberg bend. He should have put it on the Mary album, but we couldn't put it on the album in the states because he wouldn't let George Michael put it on the Ladies & Gentlemen [album] in the states".

=== Critical reception ===
In a March 1999 review, the Daily Record commented that Michael "drafted in US soul diva Blige, but the ex-Wham! star is playing safe with his third Stevie Wonder cover". Meanwhile, upon the release of Mary, Hilary Clarke of The Independent called the track "superb", and Alexis Petridis of Q described it as "slick".

In a 2016 article following Michael's death, Maura Johnston of Pitchfork praised the cover, stating that "the combination of Stevie Wonder's compositional genius and Michael's and Mary J. Blige's vocal prowess is irresistible", and that "Michael's deep knowledge of and affection for Songs in the Key of Life is evident here, and his teaming up with Blige once again shows how his R&B savvy extended to a keen facility with give-and-take male-female duets". Similarly, in a 2017 write-up of Michael's legacy, Fred Plotkin of WQXR-FM commended the song as having shifted a "vibrant ballad to a passionate love duet", adding that "Blige is properly funky and soulful while Michael is romantic and equally soulful".

=== Music video ===
A music video to accompany the single was released in the UK on 25 February 1999. Featuring extensive use of visual effects, it depicts Michael entering a modern nightclub, where numerous clones of himself and Blige, created using chroma key, are shown singing and dancing to the track. The video was made available on YouTube in 2010 and, as of August 2026, has accumulated more than 40 million views.

=== Track listings ===
- UK CD1 and cassette single
1. "As" – 4:42
2. "A Different Corner" (live at Parkinson) – 4:28
- UK CD2
1. "As" (original) – 4:42
2. "As" (Full Crew mix) – 5:37
3. "As" (CJ Mackintosh remix) – 6:06
- European and Japanese CD single
1. "As" – 4:42
2. "A Different Corner" (live at Parkinson) – 4:28
3. "As" (Full Crew mix) – 5:39
- European 12-inch single

A. "As" (original) – 4:42
B. "As" (Full Crew mix) – 5:37

- Australian maxi-CD single
1. "As" (original)
2. "As" (Full Crew mix)
3. "As" (CJ Mackintosh Cosmack R&B mix)
4. "As" (CJ Mackintosh Cosmack club mix)
5. "As" (video clip)
6. "Outside" (video clip)
7. "A Different Corner" (live at Parkinson video clip)

=== Charts ===
==== Weekly charts ====
| Chart (1999) | Peak position |
|---|---|
| Australia (ARIA) | 45 |
| Belgium (Ultratop 50 Flanders) | 42 |
| Belgium (Ultratop 50 Wallonia) | 34 |
| Europe (Eurochart Hot 100) | 12 |
| Finland (Suomen virallinen lista) | 14 |
| France (SNEP) | 27 |
| Germany (GfK) | 38 |
| Hungary (Mahasz) | 9 |
| Iceland (Íslenski Listinn Topp 40) | 20 |
| Ireland (IRMA) | 12 |
| Italy (Musica e dischi) | 8 |
| Italy Airplay (Music & Media) | 5 |
| Netherlands (Dutch Top 40) | 7 |
| Netherlands (Single Top 100) | 9 |
| New Zealand (Recorded Music NZ) | 21 |
| Scottish Singles Sales (Official Charts) | 7 |
| Spain (Promusicae) | 5 |
| Sweden (Sverigetopplistan) | 27 |
| Switzerland (Schweizer Hitparade) | 22 |
| UK Singles (Official Charts) | 4 |
| UK Hip Hop/R&B (Official Charts) | 2 |
| US Hot R&B/Hip-Hop Songs (Billboard) | 57 |

==== Year-end charts ====
| Chart (1999) | Position |
|---|---|
| Europe (Eurochart Hot 100) | 88 |
| Netherlands (Single Top 100) | 62 |
| UK Singles (OCC) | 84 |
| UK Airplay (Music Week) | 6 |

=== Certifications ===
| Region | Certification | Certified units/sales |
|---|---|---|
| Denmark (IFPI Danmark) | Gold | 45,000^{‡} |
| United Kingdom (BPI) | Gold | 400,000^{‡} |
^{‡} Sales+streaming figures based on certification alone.

=== Release history ===
| Region | Date | Format(s) | Label(s) | Ref. |
|---|---|---|---|---|
| United Kingdom | March 1, 1999 | CD; cassette | Epic | |
| Japan | March 31, 1999 | CD | Epic | |

== Other versions ==
"As" was covered by pianist Gene Harris on his 1977 album Tone Tantrum, with 30 additional seconds.

Dutch singer Tony Sherman covered it in 1977 and peaked with his version at #13 on the 9th of July in the Dutch Top 40.

Sister Sledge covered it and included it on their 1977 album Together. They later performed the song on a 1984 episode of The Jeffersons.

Funk rock artist Eddie Johns recorded a cover of "As" for his 1979 album More Spell on You.

Kimiko Kasai with Herbie Hancock covered it on the 1979 album Butterfly.

"As" was also covered by violinist Jean-Luc Ponty on his 1982 album Mystical Adventures.

Smooth jazz saxophonist/flautist Najee covered the song for his Stevie Wonder tribute album Songs from the Key of Life.

In 1996 R&B singer Case interpolated the backing vocals for his song "I Gotcha" from his self-titled debut album.

In 2000, singer Nichole Nordeman covered the song on her album This Mystery.

Dutch singer Esmée Denters covered the song for Billboard's Mashup Mondays series in 2011.

In 2011 the season 2 winners of vocal competition The Sing-Off, Committed, also covered this song on their self-titled debut album.

Anthony Hamilton and Marsha Ambrosious make cameos in the 2013 film The Best Man Holiday, in which the singers appear as themselves and perform the song as an R&B ballad at a main character's funeral.

The original Stevie Wonder version was featured in The Best Man Holiday's predecessor The Best Man in a more lighthearted scene.

In 2014 it was covered by American singer Camille for her Stevie Wonder tribute album I Sing Stevie: The Stevie Wonder Songbook, an album that received an Independent Music Awards nomination for Best Tribute Album.

In 2017 it was covered by American Multi-instrumentalist Bill Wurtz and put on his website under the Jazz page.

In 2017, American singer and actor Christopher Jackson performed the song 69th Primetime Emmy Awards during the In Memoriam segment.

Two dance-oriented versions of the song, both with the title "As Always", have reached the UK Singles Chart Top 75: one in 1989 produced by Farley "Jackmaster" Funk with Ricky Dillard on vocals; another in 1992 by Secret Life.

Singer-songwriter Becca Stevens included a cover of the song, featuring Jacob Collier, on her album Regina (2017).

In 2021 a re-mix from the original version of "As" was featured in the In Memoriam moment of the Academy Awards ceremony, credited as "I'll Be Loving You Always".

In the 2024 experimental film ***** created by Arthur Jafa the character Scar sings along to "As" in one scene, the song then becoming the non-diegetic soundtrack of the following scene.
