= Adam Mattera =

British magazine editor

Adam Mattera was the editor of Attitude magazine, a leading UK monthly publication aimed at the gay market, from 1999 to 2008. During the period, he secured numerous celebrity cover exclusives including David Beckham, Madonna, Tony Blair and Elton John that redefined the position of the magazine in the marketplace and wider popular culture. His cover interviews included George Michael's first ever 'gay press' interview, in which Michael quipped "you know more than my fucking therapist knew in the first ten years of knowing me".

He won Best Men's Magazine editor at the BSME awards (British Society of Magazine Editors) in 2005, the first time an editor of a magazine in that sector has won the award. Other magazines in the category included Arena, Esquire and Men's Health. He was again nominated the following year.

Mattera has made numerous television appearances commentating on popular culture and gay issues including 'The Richard & Judy Show' (Channel 4, 2003), '25 Years of Smash Hits', 'The Posh & Becks Years' (Sky, 2004), 'Living With Boy George' (Channel 4, 2008), 'Paul O'Grady's Hollywood' (ITV, 2017) and 'The Double Life Of George Michael' (ITV, 2018).

He has also contributed to numerous publications including The Sunday Times, The Observer Music Monthly, Time Out, Out and UK black music monthly Echoes and worked on PR for new artist launches with various major labels. His extensive celebrity interviews have included Mary J. Blige's first ever UK interview, Mariah Carey, Prince, Luther Vandross, Janet Jackson, Julie Walters, Liza Minnelli, Tony Curtis and Diana Ross.
