= Outside (George Michael song) =

1998 single by George Michael

Single by George Michael

from the album Ladies & Gentlemen: The Best of George Michael
- B-side: "Fantasy 98"
- Released: 19 October 1998
- Genre: Nu-disco; dance-pop; funk; house
- Length: 4:45
- Label: Epic
- Songwriter: George Michael
- Producers: George Michael; Jon Douglas

George Michael singles chronology
"You Have Been Loved" / "The Strangest Thing '97" (1997)	"Outside" (1998)	"As" (1999)

Music video
- "Outside" on YouTube

"Outside" is a song by the English singer-songwriter George Michael, released on 19 October 1998 as the lead single from his first greatest hits album, Ladies & Gentlemen: The Best of George Michael (1998). It was released through Epic Records and reached number two on the UK Singles Chart, becoming Michael's most recent UK top-three hit. In Greece, Hungary, and Spain, the song peaked at number one. The music video, directed by Vaughan Arnell, shows couples of various sexual orientations engaging in lewd public activities while Michael, dressed as a police officer, dances in a public toilet, referencing his arrest for cottaging in April 1998.

== Background ==
"Outside" was Michael's first single since his arrest for engaging in a lewd act six months earlier by an undercover police officer in the public toilet of the Will Rogers Memorial Park in Beverly Hills, California – an incident that prompted him to declare his homosexuality, which had been rumoured for some years but never publicly confirmed.

Michael disparaged the incident in the lyrics, claiming he wanted an alfresco sex life because he was bored with lovemaking behind closed doors. Reference to the Beverly Hills affair came with the line: "I'd service the community, but I already have, you see" (he was sentenced to 80 hours of community service for the offence) and direct samples of radio reports of his arrest.

In a 2004 interview with Adam Mattera for UK magazine Attitude, Michael reflected: "I felt that lightening the stigma around cruising was the most immediately beneficial thing I could do. I know for a fact that when I was 16, 17, when I started cruising, that watching the 'Outside' video would have taken some of the weight off my shoulders."

The song features a string section and arrangement by Andrew Skeet.

== Critical reception ==
Barry Walters for The Advocate described the song as "a spirited disco romp complete with veiled allusions to his arrest." Roberto Friedman from Bay Area Reporter declared it "a paean to public sex". Chuck Taylor from Billboard wrote that "set against a jubilant disco beat awash with strings, cascading electronic beeps, and a vocal filled with simple joy, this celebratory track could be the one to return George Michael to the hearts of the masses." He added, "The track begins with a whip of strings, a chorus of voices chanting, "Let's go outside," and a funky little guitar lick, followed by Michael's instantly recognizable vocal, sounding liberated and loose. So much of his recent material has been heavy in lyric and short on hook; as a result, he's had a tough time getting on radio in the U.S. This should begin the next era for this keeper of an artist, who at last seems comfortable just having a little fun."

Sarah Davis from Dotmusic said that "Outside" "is every bit Fast Love's [sic] twin with the singer at his most accessibly funky." She added, "Turning his arrest into musical inspiration, George Michael cheekily uses the sound of a police siren to welcome in his first new single in more than two years." Beth Johnson from Entertainment Weekly described the song as a "retro-disco hoot". Raul Cairo from Music & Media noted that "it's a superb slice of neo-'70s disco/funk, boasting tongue-in-cheek lyrics and a strong hook." Victoria Segal from NME called it a "disco inferno". In 2018, Dave Fawbert from ShortList described it as an "amazing slinky disco track", adding that it is "timeless and would still be a massive hit if was released today." Chris Gerald of PopMatters called it a "a sexy dance-pop single".

== Chart performance ==
"Outside" peaked at number one in Greece, Hungary, and Spain. In addition, it reached number two in the United Kingdom, number three in Italy, number four in Denmark, number five in Iceland, number seven in Ireland, and number eight in Finland. On the Eurochart Hot 100, "Outside" reached number three in November 1998. The song reached number three on the US Billboard Hot Dance Club Play chart, number 11 in New Zealand, and number 13 in Australia.

== Music video ==
The song's satirical music video, directed by Vaughan Arnell and filmed on 4 June 1998, features a police helicopter hovering over Los Angeles and shadowing various people, both gay and straight, kissing, having sex or engaging in foreplay, all in public. The scenes of public coupling are styled like real surveillance footage and interspersed with scenes of Michael and his dancers performing in a men's toilet. Michael is dressed as an LAPD police officer and clutching a nightstick, while the toilet is decorated like a disco nightclub, complete with flashing lights and disco balls. Two female dancers dressed in police uniforms are also seen dancing with Michael. At the end of the video, two male officers arrest numerous couples previously shown engaging in lewd conduct. The video concludes with the two police officers, thinking that they are not being watched, sharing a passionate embrace and starting to kiss, the surveillance video focusing in on their public indecency. The video ends with a shot of a rooftop neon sign reading "JESUS SAVES", followed by the on-screen captions "... all of us. all."

Before the song starts properly, the video begins with a parody of a 1970s European pornography film. As a sultry jazz saxophone score plays, the credits show "eine fulm bi Hüu Jarss", "mit Klaus Hoöd", "undë Heidi Kóchenblauer", "ars 'Cindy'", "direktum bi Marchelo Üffenvanken" – possibly a collection of made-up names and words meant to resemble Swedish, but with deliberate English puns. "Cindy" is played by Sports Illustrated swimsuit model Melissa Keller. A short passage of narration in Swedish – "Vem var hon? Var kom hon ifrån? Hade hon ätit? Då plötsligt kom jag ihåg, det var ingen dröm: jag var ... i Hollywood!" – translates as: "Who was she? Where did she come from? Had she eaten? Then suddenly I recalled, it was no dream: I was... in Hollywood!" Apart from Keller, porn stars Rebecca Lord and Brittany Andrews appear, as well as actress Jeanne Carmen.

Marcelo Rodriguez, the undercover officer who had arrested Michael, claimed the video "mocked" him and filed a legal suit for $10 million. While the matter was initially dismissed, the California Courts of Appeal reinstated the case on 3 December 2002. The judgement ruled that Rodriguez, as a public official, could not legally recover damages for emotional distress.

== Track listings ==
- UK and Australian CD single; UK cassette single
1. "Outside" – 4:45
2. "Fantasy 98" – 4:30
3. "Outside" (Jon Douglas remix) – 8:04
- UK and Australian CD single (The Mixes)
1. "Outside" (Garage mix) – 7:40
2. "Outside" (House mix) – 6:59
3. "Outside" (K-Gee's cut) – 5:18
- UK 12-inch single
1. "Outside" (original version) – 4:45
2. "Outside" (Garage mix) – 7:40
3. "Outside" (House mix) – 6:59
4. "Outside" (K-Gee's cut) – 5:18
- European CD single
1. "Outside" – 4:45
2. "Fantasy 98" – 4:30
- Japanese CD single
1. "Outside"
2. "Fantasy 98"
3. "Outside" (Jon Douglas remix)
4. "Outside" (Garage mix)
5. "Outside" (House mix)
6. "Outside" (K-Gee's cut)

== Charts ==
=== Weekly charts ===
Chart (1998)	Peak position
Australia (ARIA)	13
Austria (Ö3 Austria Top 40)	17
Belgium (Ultratop 50 Flanders)	20
Belgium (Ultratop 50 Wallonia)	12
Denmark (IFPI)	4
Europe (Eurochart Hot 100)	4
Finland (Suomen virallinen lista)	8
France (SNEP)	26
Germany (GfK)	30
Greece (IFPI)	1
Hungary (Mahasz)	1
Iceland (Íslenski Listinn Topp 40)	5
Ireland (IRMA)	7
Italy (Musica e dischi)	3
Italy Airplay (Music & Media)	1
Netherlands (Dutch Top 40)	11
Netherlands (Single Top 100)	14
New Zealand (Recorded Music NZ)	11
Norway (VG-lista)	10
Scottish Singles Sales (Official Charts)	3
Spain (AFYVE)	1
Sweden (Sverigetopplistan)	15
Switzerland (Schweizer Hitparade)	19
UK Singles (Official Charts)	2
US Dance Club Songs (Billboard)	3

=== Year-end charts ===
Chart (1998)	Position
Australia (ARIA)	68
Belgium (Ultratop 50 Wallonia)	99
Europe (Eurochart Hot 100)	56
Iceland (Íslenski Listinn Topp 40)	72
UK Singles (OCC)	54

Chart (1999)	Position
US Dance Club Play (Billboard)	46

== Certifications and sales ==
Region	Certification	Certified units/sales
Australia (ARIA)	Gold	35,000^{^}
Belgium (BRMA)	Gold	25,000^{*}
United Kingdom (BPI)	Gold	400,000^{‡}
^{*} Sales figures based on certification alone.^{^} Shipments figures based on certification alone.^{‡} Sales+streaming figures based on certification alone.

== Release history ==
Region	Date	Format(s)	Label(s)	Ref.
United States	13 October 1998	Rhythmic contemporary; contemporary hit radio	Epic	
United Kingdom	19 October 1998	CD	Epic	
Japan	6 November 1998	CD	Epic	
