= Spinning the Wheel =

1996 single by George Michael

Single by George Michael

from the album Older
- B-side: "You Know That I Want To"; "Safe"
- Released: 19 August 1996
- Genre: R&B; smooth jazz; soul; trip hop; house (remix)
- Length: 6:22 (album version); 6:09 (compilation version); 4:57 (radio edit)
- Label: Virgin; Aegean
- Songwriters: George Michael; Jon Douglas
- Producers: George Michael; Jon Douglas

George Michael singles chronology
"Fastlove" (1996)	"Spinning the Wheel" (1996)	"Older" / "I Can't Make You Love Me" (1997)

Music video
- "Spinning the Wheel" on YouTube

"Spinning the Wheel" is a song by English singer-songwriter George Michael. The song was co-written and co-produced by Michael and Jon Douglas. It was released in August 1996 by Virgin and Aegean Records as the third single from Michael's third studio album, Older (1996), and depicts the worry of a lover whose partner is sexually promiscuous during the period when AIDS was newly discovered and rampant in the West. The song peaked at number two in the United Kingdom, kept off the top by the Spice Girls' "Wannabe". The single also peaked within the top 10 in Denmark, Hungary, Israel, Italy, and Spain where it spent three consecutive weeks at number one. The accompanying music video was directed by Vaughan Arnell and Anthea Benton.

"Spinning the Wheel" subsequently appeared on both of George Michael's compilations Ladies & Gentlemen: The Best of George Michael and Twenty Five.

== Critical reception ==
Larry Flick from Billboard magazine praised the Forthright remix of "Spinning the Wheel" as a "hard-driving dance record", noting that the "sleek and jazzy interlude" from the Older album had been reconstructed "with a textured house music sound." He also complimented Michael for breaking "interesting new ground", and that the sophistication of the original recording "remains fully intact, though Forthright darkens the groove to complimentary effect". Sarah Davis from Dotmusic named it the album's "upbeat highlight", adding that it finds Michael "sending out warning signs to an errant partner": Five o'clock in the morning, you ain't home ... I will not accept this as part of my life... I would rather be alone than watch you spinning the wheel for me.

Swedish Göteborgs-Tidningen stated that it is "at least as good" as "Jesus to a Child" and "Fastlove". Elysa Gardner from Los Angeles Times said Michael "achieves a light jazz feel [on the song] that also makes for good background music". Paul Lester from Melody Maker found that songs like "Spinning the Wheel" "are snazzily produced late-night smoochathons that'll provide horny shop assistants and bank clerks with shag material for months." Music Week gave it a score of four out of five, adding that this "balladic" follow-up to two number ones, "could just hit the spot again." Victoria Segal from NME noted its "brassy bleakness". Bob Waliszewski of Plugged In said that the singer "demonstrates 'tough love' on 'Spinning the Wheel' as he walks out on an adulterous woman." Ed Morales for Vibe wrote that "the singular swing of the trip-hoppy" song "is compelling".

== Music video ==
A black-and-white music video was produced to promote the single, directed by British directors Vaughan Arnell and Anthea Benton. It features Michael performing with a band in a club and was later made available on Michael's official YouTube channel in 2010. The video has amassed more than 9.5 million views as of July 2025.

== Track listings ==
- Asian, Australian, European, and UK CD EP
1. "Spinning the Wheel" (radio edit) – 4:57
2. "You Know That I Want To" – 4:35
3. "Safe" – 4:25
4. "Spinning the Wheel" (Forthright edit) – 4:41
- Asian, Australian, European, and UK CD "The Dance Mixes"
1. "Spinning the Wheel" (Forthright club mix) – 8:11
2. "Fastlove" (Forthright edit) – 4:23
3. "Spinning the Wheel" (Jon Douglas remix) – 6:40

== Charts ==
=== Weekly charts ===
Chart (1996)	Peak position
Australia (ARIA)	14
Austria (Ö3 Austria Top 40)	29
Belgium (Ultratop 50 Flanders)	36
Belgium (Ultratop 50 Wallonia)	27
Canada Adult Contemporary (RPM)	41
Denmark (IFPI)	7
Europe (Eurochart Hot 100)	5
Europe (European Hit Radio)	4
Finland (Suomen virallinen lista)	13
Germany (GfK)	67
Hungary (Mahasz)	6
Iceland (Íslenski Listinn Topp 40)	16
Ireland (IRMA)	14
Israel (Israeli Singles Chart)	6
Italy (Musica e dischi)	10
Italy Airplay (Music & Media)	9
Netherlands (Dutch Top 40)	31
Netherlands (Single Top 100)	24
New Zealand (Recorded Music NZ)	17
Scottish Singles Sales (Official Charts)	3
Spain (AFYVE)	1
Sweden (Sverigetopplistan)	18
Switzerland (Schweizer Hitparade)	24
UK Singles (Official Charts)	2
UK Airplay (Music Week)	1
US Dance Club Songs (Billboard)	44

=== Year-end charts ===
Chart (1996)	Position
Iceland (Íslenski Listinn Topp 40)	59
UK Singles (OCC)	49
UK Airplay (Music Week)	13

== Certifications ==
Region	Certification	Certified units/sales
United Kingdom (BPI)	Silver	265,160
