= Star People (song) =

1997 single by George Michael

"Star People '97"

Single by George Michael

from the album Older
- B-side: "Everything She Wants" (live)
- Released: 4 March 1997
- Genre: Soul; funk; disco
- Length: 5:42 (single version); 4:39 (radio edit)
- Label: Virgin; Aegean
- Songwriter: George Michael
- Producer: George Michael

George Michael singles chronology
"Older" / "I Can't Make You Love Me" (1997)	"Star People '97" (1997)	"Waltz Away Dreaming" (1997)

Music video
- "Star People '97" on YouTube

"Star People '97" is a song written, produced, and performed by British singer-songwriter George Michael. It released as the fifth single from his third studio album, Older (1996), by Virgin Records in the United Kingdom and by DreamWorks Records in the United States. The lyrics make reference to the materialism and frivolity of certain (unspecified) people in show business, suggesting that those behaviours are derived from some insecurity or a bad childhood. The single version is titled "Star People '97", on most issues, because the track was re-recorded for the single release.

"Star People '97" was first released in the US on three formats over three weeks in March 1997 and was issued in the UK on 28 April 1997. The song peaked at No. 2 in the United Kingdom and No. 1 on the US Billboard Dance Club Play chart, becoming Michael's second No. 1 on this chart. Worldwide, the song reached No. 1 in Denmark and Hungary, and reached the top 10 in Iceland, Ireland, and Spain.

== Critical reception ==
Upon the release, Larry Flick from Billboard magazine wrote, "After teasing his die-hard club following for months with several rhythmic (but not quite dance) singles, George Michael has finally unleashed a slamming house music anthem from his glorious—if underappreciated—opus Older. Jeremy Healy, Amos, Mike Koglin, and Forthright have been tapped to turn the original retro pop/jazz ditty into a dance ditty. Working as a team, Healy, Amos, and Koglin successfully transform the song into an edgy anthem befitting the swagger of Michael's vocal. Meanwhile, Forthright injects a few drops of Europop flavor into the groove, making the single a viable top 40 contender. A sterling 12-inch package that was well worth the wait."

Paul Lester from Melody Maker described the song as "uptempo", noting that it "has a go at celebrity attention-seekers". A reviewer from Music Week gave "Star People '97" a score of four out of five, adding, "The restrained Older track takes on a completely new life in this re-recorded, funked up version which amounts to George's brightest, most uplifting single in a long while." Ed Morales for Vibe opined that "the halfhearted condemnation of glitz in 'Star People' has a serious Latin beat working." Retrospectively, Matthew Hocter from Albumism noted that the song "spoke to the fakery and greed that consumes many in the entertainment business, making reference to damaging childhoods and insecurity as some of the possible causes." He described it as a song "rooted in a soul, funk sound with splashes of disco".

== Track listings ==
- UK and Australian CD1; Japanese CD single
1. "Star People '97" – 5:42
2. "Everything She Wants" (live from MTV Unplugged) – 4:37
3. "Star People" (live from MTV Unplugged) – 6:01
- UK and Australian CD2
1. "Star People '97" (Galaxy mix) – 8:05
2. "Star People '97" (Forthright club mix) – 9:17
3. "Star People '97" (Galaxy dub mix) – 7:14
4. "Star People '97" (Forthright edit) – 4:28
- UK cassette single
1. "Star People '97" (radio edit) – 4:39
2. "Everything She Wants" (live from MTV Unplugged) – 4:37
3. "Star People" (live from MTV Unplugged) – 6:01
4. "Star People '97" (Forthright edit) – 4:28
- European CD single
1. "Star People '97" – 5:42
2. "Everything She Wants" (live from MTV Unplugged) – 4:37
- US CD and cassette single
1. "Star People" (LP edit) – 4:11
2. "Star People" (live from MTV Unplugged edit) – 4:31
3. "Star People" (Forthright radio edit) – 4:28
4. "The Strangest Thing" (live at the BBC Radio Theatre) – 6:01
- US maxi-CD and 12-inch single
1. "Star People" (Forthright club mix) – 9:16
2. "Star People" (Forthright dub mix) – 7:27
3. "Star People" (Galaxy mix) – 8:08
4. "Star People" (club dub mix) – 7:15
5. "Star People" (live from MTV Unplugged edit) – 4:31
6. "The Strangest Thing" (live at the BBC Radio Theatre) – 6:01

== Charts ==
=== Weekly charts ===
Chart (1997)	Peak position
Australia (ARIA)	51
Austria (Ö3 Austria Top 40)	37
Belgium (Ultratip Bubbling Under Flanders)	8
Canada Adult Contemporary (RPM)	21
Canada Dance/Urban (RPM)	17
Denmark (IFPI)	1
Europe (Eurochart Hot 100)	5
Finland (Suomen virallinen lista)	15
France Airplay (SNEP)	7
Germany (GfK)	64
Hungary (Mahasz)	1
Iceland (Íslenski Listinn Topp 40)	10
Ireland (IRMA)	7
Israel (Israeli Singles Chart)	16
Netherlands (Dutch Top 40)	24
Netherlands (Single Top 100)	40
Poland Airplay (Music & Media)	9
Scottish Singles Sales (Official Charts)	4
Spain (AFYVE)	4
Sweden (Sverigetopplistan)	37
Switzerland (Schweizer Hitparade)	28
UK Singles (Official Charts)	2
US Bubbling Under Hot 100 (Billboard)	1
US Dance Club Songs (Billboard)	1
US Dance Singles Sales (Billboard)	8

=== Year-end charts ===
Chart (1997)	Position
UK Singles (OCC)	82
US Dance Club Play (Billboard)	37

== Certifications ==
Region	Certification	Certified units/sales
United Kingdom (BPI)	Silver	200,000^{‡}
^{‡} Sales+streaming figures based on certification alone.

== Release history ==
Region	Date	Format(s)	Label(s)	Ref.
United States	4 March 1997	12-inch vinyl	DreamWorks; Aegean	
United States	11 March 1997	Cassette	DreamWorks; Aegean	
United States	18 March 1997	CD	DreamWorks; Aegean	
United Kingdom	28 April 1997	CD; cassette	Virgin; Aegean	
Japan	6 June 1997	CD	Virgin; Aegean	
