= You Have Been Loved =

1997 single by George Michael

Single by George Michael

from the album Older
- A-side: "The Strangest Thing '97"
- Released: 8 September 1997
- Length: 5:30
- Label: Virgin; Aegean
- Songwriters: George Michael; David Austin
- Producer: George Michael

George Michael singles chronology
"Waltz Away Dreaming" (1997)	"You Have Been Loved" / "The Strangest Thing '97" (1997)	"Outside" (1998)

Music video
- "You Have Been Loved" on YouTube

"You Have Been Loved" is a song by English singer and songwriter George Michael, recorded for his third studio album, Older (1996). It was written by Michael and David Austin and produced by Michael. On 8 September 1997, "You Have Been Loved" was released as a double A-side single with "The Strangest Thing '97" and reached number two in the United Kingdom.

== Background ==
Michael wrote "You Have Been Loved" about his lover, Anselmo Feleppa, who died of an AIDS-related illness in 1993. It was released as the sixth single from Older. "The Strangest Thing", also from the album, was remixed and re-recorded for this release as a more up-tempo track, the original version more a Middle Eastern and bossa-nova song.

== Critical reception ==
Matthew Hocter from Albumism said "You Have Been Loved" is "one of the album's most heartbreaking and painfully personal love songs". A reviewer from Music Week rated it four out of five, describing it as "a gorgeous but painfully sad ballad about the loss of a loved one. May be too downbeat to get his usual feverish radio support, but should go Top 10." The magazine's Alan Jones felt it is "George at his most laidback." He added, "Beautifully sung mood music, it meanders mellifluously for more than five minutes and is like a breath of fresh air, though the fact that Older has sold so many copies already, and the track's lack of a commercial hook, will limit its chart potential." An editor from Sunday Mirror wrote, "A beautiful ballad. Considering recent events, it strikes the perfect chord. Enough said." Alan Jackson from The Times declared it as a "lush, achingly tasteful ballad on bereavement" from "pop's King of Sorrows."

== Track listings ==
- Asian, Australian, European, and UK CD EP
1. "You Have Been Loved" – 5:29
2. "The Strangest Thing '97" (radio mix) – 4:40
3. "Father Figure" (live from MTV Unplugged) – 6:13
4. "Praying for Time" (live from MTV Unplugged) – 5:22
- European and UK CD II
1. "The Strangest Thing '97" (Loop Ratz mix) – 8:46
2. "The Strangest Thing '97" (radio mix) – 4:40
3. "You Have Been Loved" – 5:29
- European CD single
1. "You Have Been Loved" – 5:29
2. "The Strangest Thing '97" (radio mix) – 4:40

== Charts ==
=== Weekly charts ===
Chart (1997)	Peak position
Australia (ARIA)	75
Belgium (Ultratip Bubbling Under Flanders)	7
Denmark (IFPI)	7
Europe (Eurochart Hot 100)	9
Ireland (IRMA)	11
Israel (Israeli Singles Chart)	21
Netherlands (Dutch Top 40)	21
Netherlands (Single Top 100)	44
Poland Airplay (Music & Media)	9
Scottish Singles Sales (Official Charts)	4
Sweden (Sverigetopplistan)	53
UK Singles (Official Charts)	2

=== Year-end charts ===
Chart (1997)	Position
UK Singles (OCC)	72

== Certifications ==
Region	Certification	Certified units/sales
United Kingdom (BPI)	Silver	200,000^{^}
^{^} Shipments figures based on certification alone.
