= Fastlove =

1996 single by George Michael

Single by George Michael

from the album Older
- B-side: "I'm Your Man '96"
- Released: 22 April 1996
- Studio: Sarm West (London)
- Genre: Dance-pop; R&B; new jack swing
- Length: 5:26 (album version); 4:45 (promo/radio version); 5:06 (video version)
- Label: Virgin; Aegean
- Songwriters: George Michael; Patrice Rushen; Freddie Washington; Terri McFaddin
- Producers: George Michael; Jon Douglas

George Michael singles chronology
"Jesus to a Child" (1996)	"Fastlove" (1996)	"Spinning the Wheel" (1996)

Music video
- "Fastlove" on YouTube

"Fastlove" is a song by the English singer-songwriter George Michael, released on 22 April 1996 as the second single from his third album, Older (1996). It was written by Michael, Patrice Rushen, Freddie Washington and Terri McFaddin and produced by Michael and Jon Douglas. It interpolates Rushen's 1982 single "Forget Me Nots". The single was issued in the US by DreamWorks Records and Virgin and Aegean Records elsewhere.

"Fastlove" received positive reviews and topped the charts in Australia, Hungary, Italy, Spain, and the UK. It also reached number one on the Canadian RPM Adult Contemporary chart. In the US, it reached number eight and number six on the US Billboard Hot 100 and the US Cash Box Top 100. It was Michael's seventh and final number one in the UK during his lifetime and is his seventh-most downloaded track there, earning a gold certification for selling and streaming over 600,000 units. It was nominated for Best Single at the 1997 Brit Awards.

The music video, directed by Vaughan Arnell and Anthea Benton, was nominated for the video category at the Brit Awards and three MTV Video Music Awards in 1996. It won the International Viewer's Choice Award—MTV Europe.

== Production ==
"Fastlove" was produced by Michael and Jon Douglas. They met while Douglas was working on Lisa Moorish's album I've Gotta Have It All while Michael was working in the same studio, Sarm West in London. Douglas asked Michael to contribute vocals to Moorish's cover of "I'm Your Man" by Michael's previous band, Wham!. Afterwards, Michael asked Douglas to work on his album, Older.

The first version of "Fastlove" had a bossa nova rhythm. Douglas created a new arrangement, retaining Michael's vocals and the saxophone played by Andy Hamilton. He added drums, sound effects, orchestral stabs and scratches using an Akai MPC3000 workstation. This was synchronised via MIDI to a Mac running Cubase, which was used to sequence the keyboard parts.

The bass was played on keyboard, using samples of a Fender bass guitar, and quantised using the MPC. Additional bass parts, including slides and slaps, were added from a sample library. The team added organ from an E-mu sound module and arpeggios from a Korg Prophecy synthesiser, and recorded the sine wave-like lead from a Minimoog clone. Douglas recorded the "gotta get up to get down" vocal by singing through a Digitech Vocalist processor.

The engineer Dave Clews said that Michael, a perfectionist, was sometimes frustrating, as he would often discard and replace work the team was happy with. Clews said he was the only singer he ever worked with who would not allow his vocals to be pitch-corrected. When "Fastlove" was almost complete, Michael decided to add an interpolation of the 1982 Patrice Rushen single "Forget Me Nots" to the outro, which required another two weeks of work. Rather than sampling "Forget Me Nots", the team interpolated it by recreating the bass and vocal hook.

== Release ==
An energetic tune about needing gratification and fulfillment without concern for commitment, "Fastlove" was the second single taken from Michael's third studio album, Older, his first studio album in six years. For the B-side, a remake of the Wham! song "I'm Your Man" was used. Entitled "I'm Your Man '96", it was an update of one of their last singles, a decade earlier.

== Critical reception ==
While reviewing Older, Stephen Thomas Erlewine from AllMusic said although "Fastlove" is the album's only dance track, it still "lacks the carefree spark of his earlier work." He still chose the song later as his one of his "track picks." Larry Flick of Billboard magazine described it as a "sleek groove that is a direct descendant of 'Good Times' by Chic." He noted that Michael "deftly cruises between breathy sensuality and full-bodied belting", adding that the "icing on the cake is a chorus and refrain that are immediate sing-along fodder." Daina Darzin from Cash Box wrote that "Fastlove" "pumps up both the volume and the velocity for a terminally danceable, happy-feet track that's sure to become a staple in discos across the U.S." She also remarked that it features "the sort of ultra-lush, opulent soul vibe that's been Michael's hallmark throughout his career." The Daily Vault's Melanie Love called it a "plea for noncommittal, one-night stands as a way to avoid the pain of relationships". She noted further, "It's got a silky-smooth groove with touches of brass, and Michael's voice is as stellar as ever, slick and teasing yet somehow revelatory, giving this track a hookiness despite lacking an actual chorus." Jon Kutner from 1000 UK Number One Hits said the line "Stupid Cupid keeps on calling me and I see nothing in his eyes" had a dual interpretation which could imply Michael's homosexuality.

Entertainment Weekly's Jim Farber gave the song an "A". He stated, "It took real guts to release a salute to a one-night stand in this, the era of abstinence," also praising its "devilishly seductive bass" and "sleekly probing horns". Farber concluded his review saying the track is the "best slow-groove dance record since Lisa Stansfield's 'All Around the World'." Irish Evening Herald said it is "very like" his 1992 hit "Too Funky", adding that it "restores George to his rightful place as purveyor of whiteboy R&B to a middle-class audience." Hans-Petter Kjøge from Norwegian Fredrikstad Blad named it "quality pop of the best brand." Swedish Göteborgs-Tidningen complimented it as "nicely funky". Paul Lester from Melody Maker praised it as an "excellent swing/funk number" and "a neat reminder that Michael's old group Wham! began life as members of the music press-credible radical dance faction". A reviewer from Music & Media called it a "uncomplicated, good-time funky dance track in which the repetition of the title has a lasting effect", and noted that the production and atmosphere is "owing much to late-'70s disco grooves". Music Week gave "Fastlove" a top score of five out of five, writing that "it's got all the right ingredients for Top 10 success—Michael's crooning vocals over an uptempo dancey beat. Radio play is already substantial." Victoria Segal from NME noted "the thrill-stalking emptiness" of the song. Writing about the album for Rolling Stone, Al Weisel called it a "bouncy disco concoction" that is "flavored with Dr. Dre-style whistling synths."

Michael E. Ross from Salon Magazine said that Michael "gets back to bold, bumptious funk, the singer clearly reveling in those buoyant rhythms of the not-too-distant past." In 2014, Brendon Veevers from British webzine Renowned for Sound ranked the song at number four on his "Top 10 George Michael Hits" list, saying, "[The song] is a slick, ultra-modern dance-pop track that sits quite contrasting to the rest of the Older tracks but has held up exceptionally well over the past almost-20 years since it was offered to us." In 2017, Dave Fawbert of ShortList called Fastlove "one of the greatest songs ever made", noting that, at a time when Britpop was at its height "George Michael decided to completely ignore it and release a truly slinky R&B/soul number which announced, with the utmost style, that he would be just as relevant in the '90s as he had been in the '80s." He was also full of praise for Fastlove Part II, although criticized the "Summer Mix" of the song as lacking "the fruity bass of the original". Fawbert later produced a half-hour version of "Fastlove" as a homage.

== Chart performance ==
The song reached the number one spot in United Kingdom, where it stayed for three weeks. It also reached number one in Australia, Hungary, Italy and Spain. "Fastlove" later became Michael's seventh-most downloaded track in the United Kingdom, according to Official Charts Company in 2014. In the United States, "Fastlove" peaked at number eight and has since become a classic in George Michael's catalogue. It finished at number 62 on the US Billboard year-end chart. To date, this is the final George Michael single to enter the Billboard Hot 100. Additionally, it peaked at number 10 on the Billboard Rhythmic chart and number 14 on the Billboard Mainstream Top 40. In Canada, "Fastlove" peaked at number four on the RPM 100 Hit Tracks chart and number one on the RPM Adult Contemporary chart.

== Music video ==
Directed by British directors Vaughan Arnell and Anthea Benton, the music video for "Fastlove" begins with a flickering virtual reality image of a woman on a bed followed by a man sitting in a black chair using a high-tech remote control device to "flip" through a variety of sexual virtual reality characters. Michael appears in the black chair, which is equipped with speakers. At one point, one of the dancers is shown wearing headphones displaying the word 'FONY' in the style of the Sony corporate logo, a reference to the contractual dispute Michael was having at the time with Sony Music Entertainment (formerly CBS Records). Throughout the video, various men and women who display a wide spectrum of characteristics, including one who is shy, another who is lustful, and another who is a complete emotional wreck (played by Rachel Williams), sit in the chair and use the remote control to summon more sexual characters. As the video ends, Michael is seen dancing while water rains down on him. The video ends with the same flickering virtual reality image that introduces to the video.

The music video was nominated for three 1996 MTV Video Music Awards, including: Best Dance Video, Best Choreography in a Video and International Viewer's Choice Award—MTV Europe—which it won.

== Live performances ==
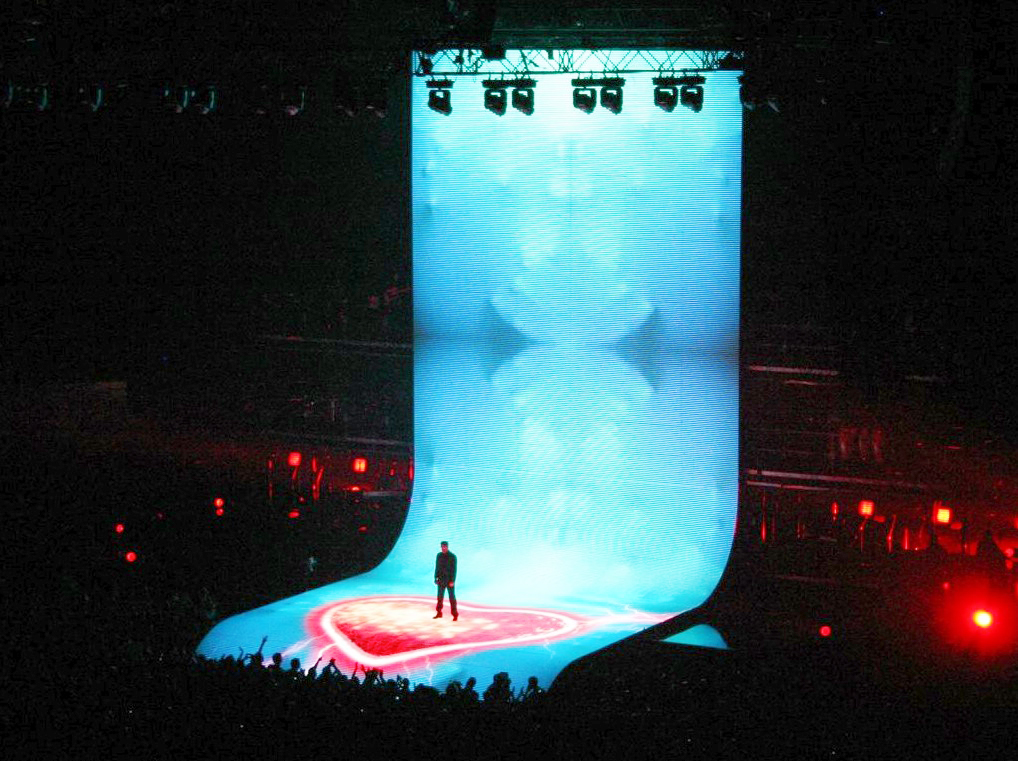
Michael performing the song during the 25 Live tour in 2006, with the backdrop containing scenes from the music video

Michael performed an alternative version of the song (known as the "Summer Mix" that was included as a track on the single releases) on his MTV Unplugged segment on 11 October 1996 in London, the taping later premiered on the network on 11 December. Barry Walters in a review for The Advocate, describing the performance: "During 'Fastlove' he changes the melody considerably, and a huge mass of background singers drops all sorts of gospel-influenced vocal doodads." The live audio of the song was uploaded onto Michael's official SoundCloud.

"Fastlove" was the opening song for his first leg of the 25 Live tour with graphics flowed behind and beneath him on a curved, cascading screen. Adele performed the song during the 59th Annual Grammy Awards, in tribute to Michael. She restarted her slow, mournful arrangement of it at one point because she was not satisfied with how it was going and saying that Michael was too important to her for her to not get it right.

== Track listings ==
- UK, Australasian, and Japanese CD single
1. "Fastlove Part I" – 5:27
2. "I'm Your Man" – 4:06
3. "Fastlove Part II" (fully extended mix) – 9:28
- UK 12-inch single

A1. "Fastlove Part II" (fully extended mix)
B1. "I'm Your Man"
B2. "Fastlove Part I"

- UK cassette single and European CD single
1. "Fastlove Part I" – 5:27
2. "I'm Your Man" – 4:06
- US CD single
1. "Fastlove" (full version)
2. "I'm Your Man '96"
3. "Fastlove" (summer mix)
- US 7-inch and cassette single
1. "Fastlove" (full version) – 5:24
2. "I'm Your Man '96" – 4:10
- US 12-inch single

A2. "Fastlove" (extended version) – 9:29
A2. "Fastlove" (full version) – 5:25
B1. "I'm Your Man '96" – 4:06
B2. "Fastlove" (summer mix) – 4:42

== Charts ==
=== Weekly charts ===
Chart (1996–1997)	Peak position
Australia (ARIA)	1
Austria (Ö3 Austria Top 40)	13
Belgium (Ultratop 50 Flanders)	25
Belgium (Ultratop 50 Wallonia)	8
Canada Top Singles (RPM)	4
Canada Adult Contemporary (RPM)	1
Canada Dance/Urban (RPM)	6
Czech Republic (IFPI CR)	4
Denmark (IFPI)	4
Estonia (Eesti Top 20)	2
Europe (Eurochart Hot 100)	3
Europe (European Hit Radio)	1
Finland (Suomen virallinen lista)	5
France (SNEP)	10
France Airplay (Music & Media)	1
Germany (GfK)	25
Hungary (Mahasz)	1
Hungary Airplay (HCRA)	1
Iceland (Íslenski Listinn Topp 40)	9
Ireland (IRMA)	5
Israel (Israeli Singles Chart)	3
Italy (Musica e dischi)	1
Italy Airplay (Music & Media)	1
Netherlands (Dutch Top 40)	14
Netherlands (Single Top 100)	12
New Zealand (Recorded Music NZ)	5
Norway (VG-lista)	11
Scottish Singles Sales (Official Charts)	2
Spain (AFYVE)	1
Spain Airplay (Music & Media)	3
Sweden (Sverigetopplistan)	7
Sweden (Swedish Dance Chart)	4
Switzerland (Schweizer Hitparade)	13
Taiwan (IFPI)	2
UK Dance (Official Charts)	7
UK Singles (Official Charts)	1
UK Airplay (Music Week)	1
UK Club Chart (Music Week)	60
UK Pop Tip Club Chart (Music Week)	1
US Billboard Hot 100	8
US Adult Contemporary (Billboard)	8
US Adult Pop Airplay (Billboard)	14
US Dance Singles Sales (Billboard)	43
US Hot R&B/Hip-Hop Songs (Billboard)	44
US Pop Airplay (Billboard)	14
US Rhythmic Airplay (Billboard)	10
US Cash Box Top 100	6

=== Year-end charts ===
Chart (1996)	Position
Australia (ARIA)	20
Belgium (Ultratop 50 Wallonia)	40
Canada Top Singles (RPM)	39
Canada Adult Contemporary (RPM)	13
Europe (European Hit Radio)	1
Europe (Eurochart Hot 100)	24
France (SNEP)	21
Iceland (Íslenski Listinn Topp 40)	82
Sweden (Topplistan)	69
Sweden (Swedish Dance Chart)	34
Switzerland (Schweizer Hitparade)	46
UK Singles (OCC)	21
UK Airplay (Music Week)	1
US Billboard Hot 100	62
US Top 40/Mainstream (Billboard)	71
US Top 40/Rhythm-Crossover (Billboard)	70

== Certifications ==
Region	Certification	Certified units/sales
Australia (ARIA)	Platinum	70,000^{^}
Denmark (IFPI Danmark)	Gold	45,000^{‡}
France (SNEP)	Gold	250,000^{*}
New Zealand (RMNZ)	Gold	15,000^{‡}
United Kingdom (BPI)	Platinum	600,000^{‡}
United States (RIAA)	Gold	500,000
^{*} Sales figures based on certification alone.^{^} Shipments figures based on certification alone.^{‡} Sales+streaming figures based on certification alone.

== Release history ==
Region	Date	Format(s)	Label(s)	Ref.
United States	16 April 1996	Contemporary hit radio	DreamWorks; Aegean	
United Kingdom	22 April 1996	12-inch vinyl; CD; cassette	Virgin; Aegean	
Japan	22 May 1996	CD	Virgin; Aegean	
