= Aegean Records =

British independent record label

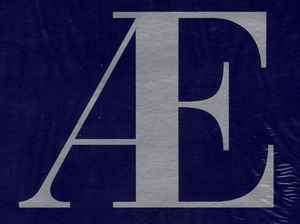
- Parent company: Nobby's Hobbies Holdings
- Founded: 1996
- Founder: George Michael
- Status: Defunct
- Distributor: Pinnacle Entertainment
- Genre: Pop; R&B; soul
- Country of origin: United Kingdom
- Official website: aegean.net

Aegean Records was an independent record label founded by George Michael in 1996. The label was set up after Michael broke from Sony Music after his court case, which he eventually lost.

The artists either signed or previously signed to Aegean Records include:

- George Michael;
- Trigger;
- Primitiva;
- Joanna Bryant;
- Bassey Walker;
- Toby Bourke.

George Michael founded Aegean Net Ltd on 15 November 1996, which was the internet component of Aegean Records. Michael and Andros Georgiou were directors of the business, although Georgiou resigned as a director on 25 January 2000 via a dubious exit that involved allegations of theft and wrongdoing. In May 1997, Aegean became the first European record label to adopt the Liquid Audio secure electronic music-delivery system via www.aegean.net, which was launched one year before BowieNet, and 11 years before Spotify.

Aegean.net was the first artist-owned website to allow fans to:

- Chat with music artists (including Michael);
- Purchase merchandise;
- Purchase and download music (via Liquid Audio);
- Audio/video streaming (via RealVideo);
- Join the first online-only fan club;
- Receive news and updates from Michael and other Aegean Records artists.

== See also ==
- List of record labels
