= George Michael: The Faith Tour =

British concert film

- Cinema release poster
- Directed by: Andy Morahan; David Austin
- Produced by: David Austin; Lucie Avery; Rosie Holley; Philip Noel
- Starring: George Michael
- Edited by: Ben Wainwright-Pearce
- Music by: George Michael
- Production companies: Mercury Studios; George Michael Entertainment
- Distributed by: Universal Pictures
- Release dates: 27 October 2026 (BFI IMAX); 6 November 2026 (United Kingdom)
- Running time: 114 minutes (Note: Runtime from website shows 114 minutes, but it comes with an 8-minute short film attachment, titled Finding Faith. Runtime for the concert film is shorter.)
- Country: United Kingdom
- Language: English
- Box office: £3.9 million ($5.2 million)

George Michael: The Faith Tour is a 2026 British concert film featuring English singer-songwriter George Michael, directed by Andy Morahan and David Austin. It documents the Paris shows during the European leg of the Faith Tour (1988–1989), Michael's first headlining solo concert tour. The film is produced by George Michael Entertainment and Mercury Studios in association with Globe Originals.

Filming took place on 30 and 31 May 1988 across two consecutive shows at the Palais Omnisports de Paris-Bercy in Paris. On 10 March 2026, George Michael Entertainment in partnership with Mercury Studios announced the release of the never-before-seen film.

George Michael: The Faith Tour premiered at the BFI IMAX in London on 27 October 2026, and was given a limited theatrical release by Universal Pictures in the United Kingdom on 6 November 2026. The film received generally positive reviews from critics.

== Synopsis ==
The theatrical release of the film is opened by a seven-minute short film by Mary McCartney entitled Finding Faith. The short features unseen photographs of Michael by American photographer Herb Ritts, an unheard voice-over interview by Michael recorded between 1989-1990, as well as behind-the-scenes footage from the music video shoot for "Faith". The film highlights the reinvention of his image and musical sound as a solo artist.

=== Concert ===
The concert footage is from the 30 and 31 May 1988 in Paris during the Faith Tour, the first headlining solo concert tour by the English singer-songwriter George Michael. Representing Michael's discography from Wham! to his solo debut album Faith, it depicts performances of most songs on the tour's set list.

The performance opens with a cage-like set design to an organ playing Wham!'s "Freedom" and the door rising revealing Michael striking a pose. Then it goes straight into "I Want Your Sex". Michael wears a white T-shirt, black leather jacket with BSA logo and "Rockers Revenge", a pair of stone-washed Levi's 501 jeans and boots. "Hard Day" and "Love's in Need of Love Today" quickly follow. Michael performs the first Wham! song "Everything She Wants", then "Father Figure" and the other Wham! track "I'm Your Man" wearing a stonewash denim jacket. It transfers into the ballad "A Different Corner" with the lights down and the crowd wave lighters.

Before singing "Faith", Michael says “OK This next song, this next song, I’m not going to sing, you’re gonna sing, I’m going to sing just the first line” soon after appearing with an acoustic guitar over his shoulder and Ray-Ban aviator sunglasses. He gets the audience to sing most of the song. He has changed into a white T-shirt with braces. This is followed by "Monkey". During the duet of "Lady Marmalade", he is joined by backing vocalist Lynn Mabry.

The show closes with Michael to do the encore — the last song "I Want Your Sex Parts 1 and 2". Afterwards he stands alone inside the cage-set design with the roof slowly closing and the lights turn off to the same organ playing "Freedom". The film ends with "Too Shy to Say" sung by Michael, playing over the credits.

== Production ==
=== Background and development ===
The global Faith tour, which began in February 1988, spanned nine months in fifteen countries until October the same year, with three final shows in the summer of 1989. The film's principal photography took place over two consecutive nights, on 30 and 31 May 1988, during the European leg at the Palais Omnisports de Paris-Bercy in Paris, captured on 35mm film using 14 cameras. This performance was considered a once lost film with the film now being restored and remastered.

According to Morahan, the original director of the two shows in Paris, Michael asked him to film the concerts since he was feeling settled into the tour by that point. After filming completed and the Faith tour ended, Michael had emotional highs and lows, pressures of fame and then went into recording the next album. From this footage, some of the best clips were used for the "Monkey" music video released in July 1988. He also stated the footage was not lost or shelved but stored and that they could have revisited it at some point, however this never happened.

The post-production sound mixing was done by Chris Porter and Simon Hill at Abbey Road Studios, London.

== Music ==
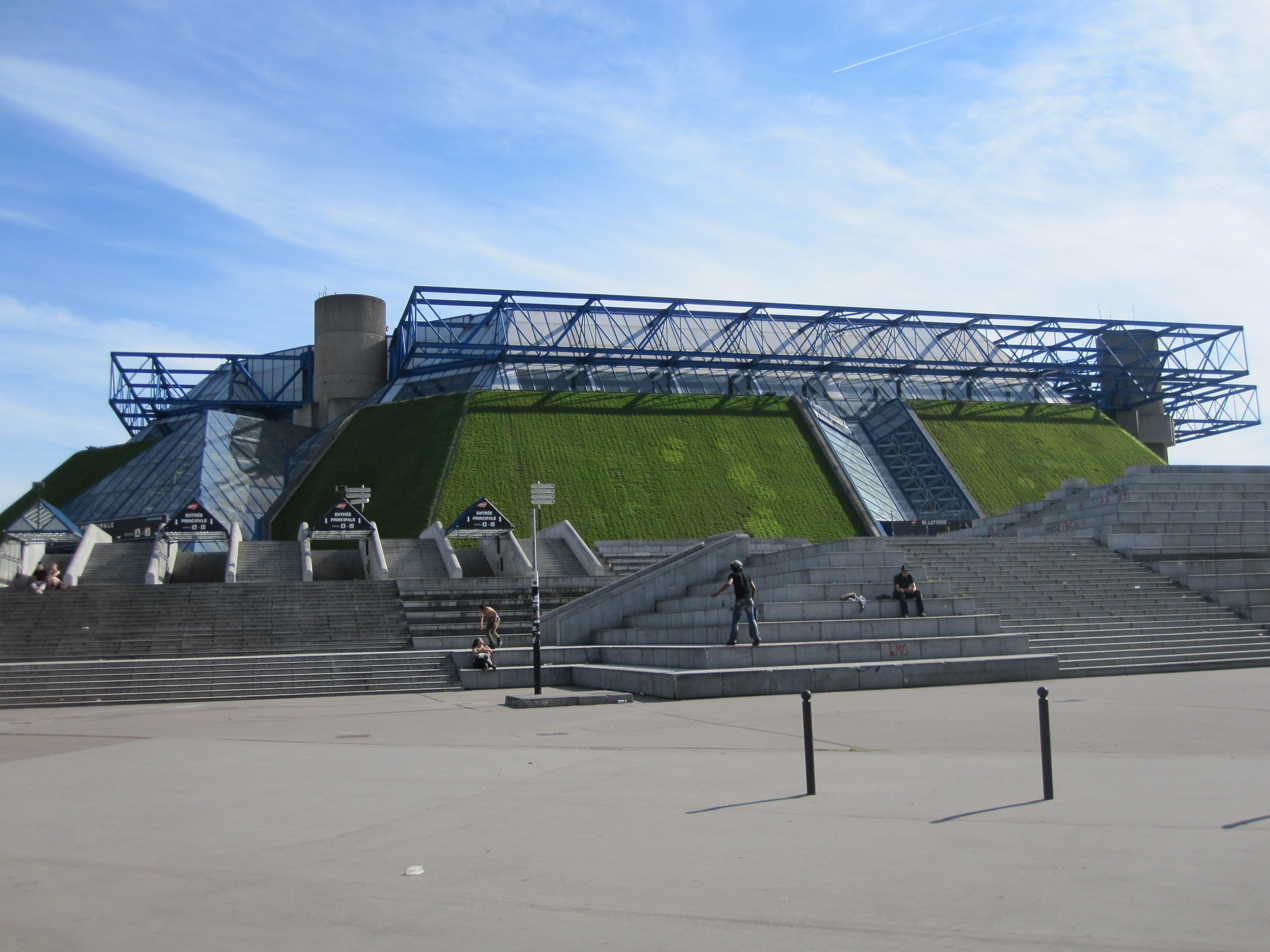
The Palais omnisports de Paris-Bercy where the concerts were held.

The set list for the concert film is as follows:

=== Set list ===
1. "Freedom" Opening
2. "I Want Your Sex"
3. "Hard Day"
4. "Love's in Need of Love Today"
5. "Everything She Wants"
6. "Father Figure"
7. "I'm Your Man"
8. "A Different Corner"
9. "Faith"
10. "Monkey"
11. "Play That Funky Music"
12. "One More Try"
13. "I Knew You Were Waiting (For Me)"
14. "Careless Whisper"
15. "Lady Marmalade"
16. "I Want Your Sex Parts 1 and 2"
17. "Freedom" Finale
18. "Too Shy To Say" (End Credits)

== Release ==
In July 2026, Bleecker Street acquired North American distribution rights to the film under its Crosswalk label, with the Universal Pictures Content Group taking international rights; both companies plan to release the film theatrically later in the year. It will be released in the United States and Canada on 11 December. The film will be attached with a short film in theatrical screenings, Finding Faith.

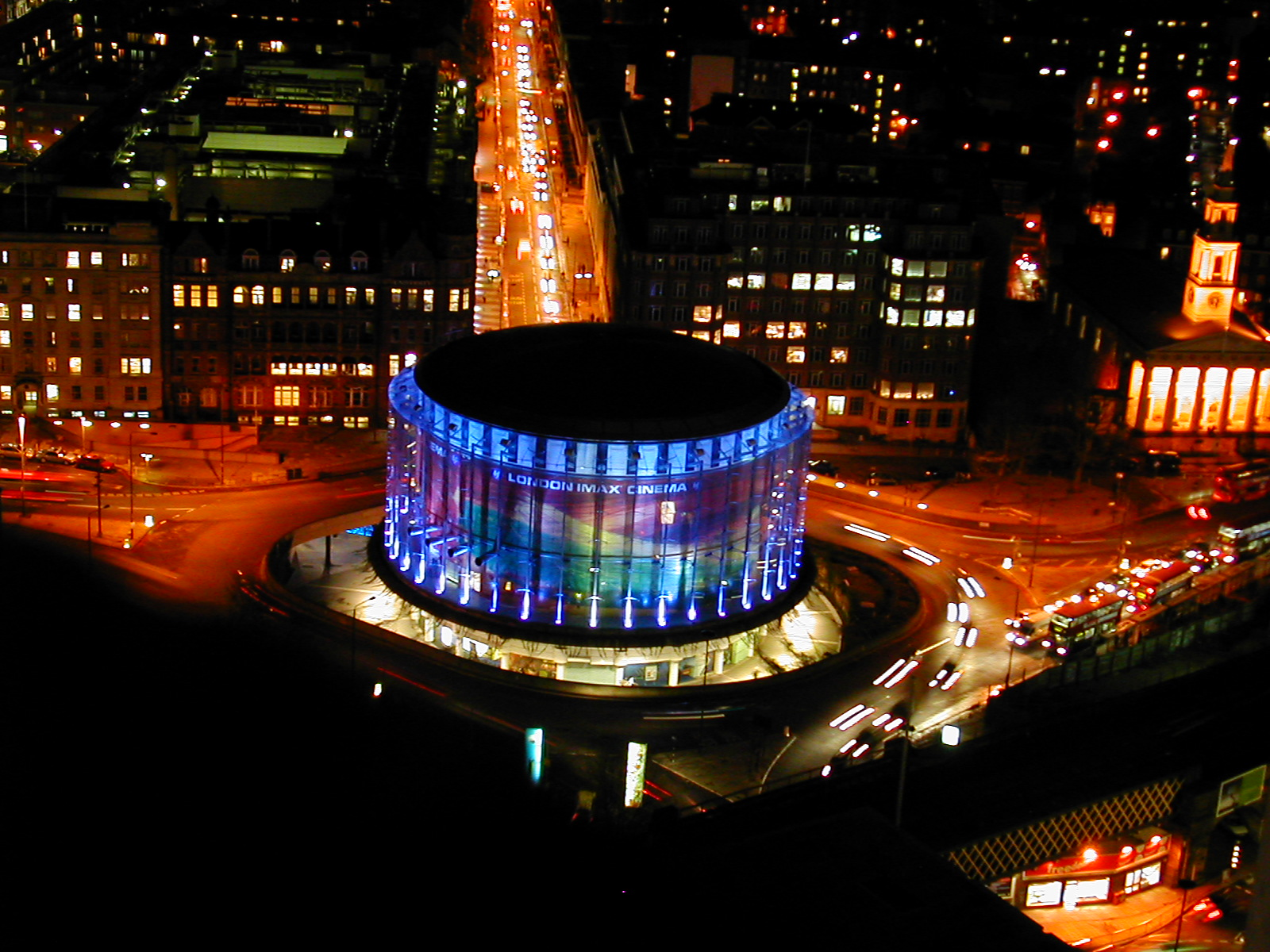
The BFI IMAX in London, hosted the world premiere of George Michael: The Faith Tour on 27 October 2026.

The Faith Tour had its world premiere at the BFI IMAX, a cinema in Waterloo, London on 27 October 2026 and was released in the UK on 6 November 2026, including in IMAX. The Faith Tour premiere at the BFI cinema was attended by celebrities and those involved in the film including Andy Morahan, Mary McCartney and David Austin.

== Reception ==
=== Box office ===
George Michael: The Faith Tour grossed £1.7 million in the United Kingdom, and £2.1 million in other territories, for a total worldwide gross of ($4,987,640) £3.8 million.

In the United Kingdom, the film grossed £1,023,447 from 590 cinemas in its opening weekend, with a per-screen average of £1,734, finishing fifth at the box office the week ending 8 November 2026. It grossed another £251,572 in its second weekend (a 75% decrease) with a per-screen average of £621 from 405 cinema screens; finishing twelfth at the box office, and grossing £1.7 million ($2.2 million) through 10 days.

==== Other territories ====
Outside the United Kingdom, The Faith Tour received a worldwide cinema release in other territories from 5 November 2026 in select European and Latin American markets. The top markets for opening weekend were Netherlands (US$237,868), Italy ($207,228), Denmark ($110,969), Poland, ($75,796), Belgium ($63,750), Spain ($32,987), Sweden ($27,794), Hungary ($25,105) and Finland ($17,165). The film expanded the following weekend into other countries including Germany, France and Australia.

As of 18 November 2026, the highest-grossing territories were Netherlands ($391,753), France ($378,327), Italy ($325,802), Australia ($268,267), Germany ($249,103), Denmark ($151,983), Poland ($131,579), Belgium ($70,196) and Spain ($57,602).

=== Critical response ===
Anna Smith of Rolling Stone UK gave The Faith Tour four out of five stars, calling it an "impressive showcase of the late musician’s singing, showmanship and stamina". She praised Michael’s performance, writing that "No matter how much he dances and races around, Michael’s voice never wavers". The Sydney Morning Herald praised the footage calling it "remarkable" and a "pristine time capsule", and wrote: "As a cinematic event, it’s immersive. In the arena, we’re surrounded by 20,000 fans swaying cigarette lighters in a way that might horrify young phone addicts and OHS officers alike."

== The Faith Tour (album) ==
The Faith Tour

Live album by George Michael
- Released: 6 November 2026
- Recorded: 30-31 May 1988
- Venue: Palais Omnisports de Paris-Bercy (Paris)
- Length: 101 minutes
- Label: Sony Music Cmg
- Producers: Chris Porter; David Austin

George Michael chronology
Listen Without Prejudice / MTV Unplugged (2017)	The Faith Tour (2026)

In September 2026, it was announced that an accompanying 18-track live album titled The Faith Tour would be released on a range of formats, including 2-CD and vinyl (the 2LP with 16 tracks), on 6 November 2026 by Sony Music. The album was recorded in 1988 at the Palais Omnisports de Paris-Bercy in Paris and contains previously unreleased performances, mixed by British producer Chris Porter and David Austin in Porterhouse Studios and AIR Studio 2 and mastered by John Webber.

=== Track listing ===
The 2LP version has 16 tracks omitting "Hand to Mouth" and "Play That Funky Music". The song "I Knew You Were Waiting (For Me)" is moved to side A track 5. All tracks are written by and produced by George Michael, except where noted. Below shows the (3LP / 2CD / Digital).

Disc one
No.	Title	Writer(s)	Original Album	Length
1.	"Freedom Opening"		Faith	2:47
2.	"I Want Your Sex"		Faith	4:44
3.	"Hard Day"		Faith	5:17
4.	"Love's In Need Of Love Today"	Wonder	B-Side of Father Figure	4:57
5.	"Everything She Wants"		Make It Big	9:17
6.	"Father Figure"		Faith	5:57
7.	"I'm Your Man"		Music from the Edge of Heaven	5:37
8.	"A Different Corner"		Music from the Edge of Heaven	5:36
9.	"Faith"		Faith	4:56

Disc two
No.	Title	Writer(s)	Original Album	Length
1.	"Monkey"		Faith	5:17
2.	"Hand To Mouth (*Not included in 2LP)"		Faith	5:00
3.	"Play That Funky Music (*Not included in 2LP)"	Parissi	Non-album track	4:40
4.	"One More Try"		Faith	6:22
5.	"I Knew You Were Waiting (For Me)"	Climie; Morgan	Aretha	4:28
6.	"Careless Whisper"	Michael; Ridgeley	Make It Big	7:51
7.	"Lady Marmalade"		Non-album track	6:41
8.	"I Want Your Sex Pts 1 and 2"		Faith	9:34
9.	"Freedom Finale"		Faith	2:50

=== Charts ===
Chart performance for The Faith Tour Album
Chart (2026)	Peak position
Australian Albums (ARIA)	44
Austrian Albums (Ö3 Austria)	6
Belgian Albums (Ultratop Flanders)	8
Belgian Albums (Ultratop Wallonia)	3
Dutch Albums (Album Top 100)	13
German Albums (Offizielle Top 100)	5
Hungarian Albums (MAHASZ)	21
Irish Albums (Official Charts)	29
Italian Albums (FIMI)	24
Japanese Digital Albums (Oricon)	89
Japanese Download Albums (Billboard Japan)	78
Polish Albums (ZPAV)	44
Scottish Albums (Official Charts)	5
Swiss Albums (Schweizer Hitparade)	7
UK Albums (Official Charts)	7
US Top Album Sales (Billboard)	19

== See also ==
- George Michael: A Different Story
- George Michael: Live in London
