= The Faith Tour =

1988–89 concert tour by George Michael

- World tour by George Michael
- Tour programme cover
- Location: North America; Europe; Oceania; Asia
- Associated album: Faith
- Start date: 19 February 1988
- End date: 6 July 1989
- Legs: 4
- No. of shows: List: 45 in the United States; 13 in Australia; 11 in the United Kingdom; 6 in Japan; 5 in France; 4 in Netherlands; 4 in Italy; 4 in Canada; 3 in Spain; 2 in New Zealand; 2 in Sweden; 2 in West Germany; 2 in Switzerland; 1 in Norway; 1 in Austria; Total: 109
- Guests: Aretha Franklin; Andrew Ridgeley
- Supporting acts: Deon Estus; The Bangles; Johnny Clegg & Savuka
- Attendance: 2.5 million
- Box office: US tour dates: US $15 million ($40.83 million in 2024 dollars)

George Michael concert chronology
- The Final (1986); The Faith Tour (1988–89); Cover to Cover tour (1991)

The Faith Tour was the first solo concert tour by English singer-songwriter George Michael, launched in support of his multi-million selling debut solo album Faith. The tour spanned nine months between February and October 1988 with three final shows in the summer of 1989, comprising 109 shows across sixteen countries. It was choreographed by Paula Abdul.

== Overview ==
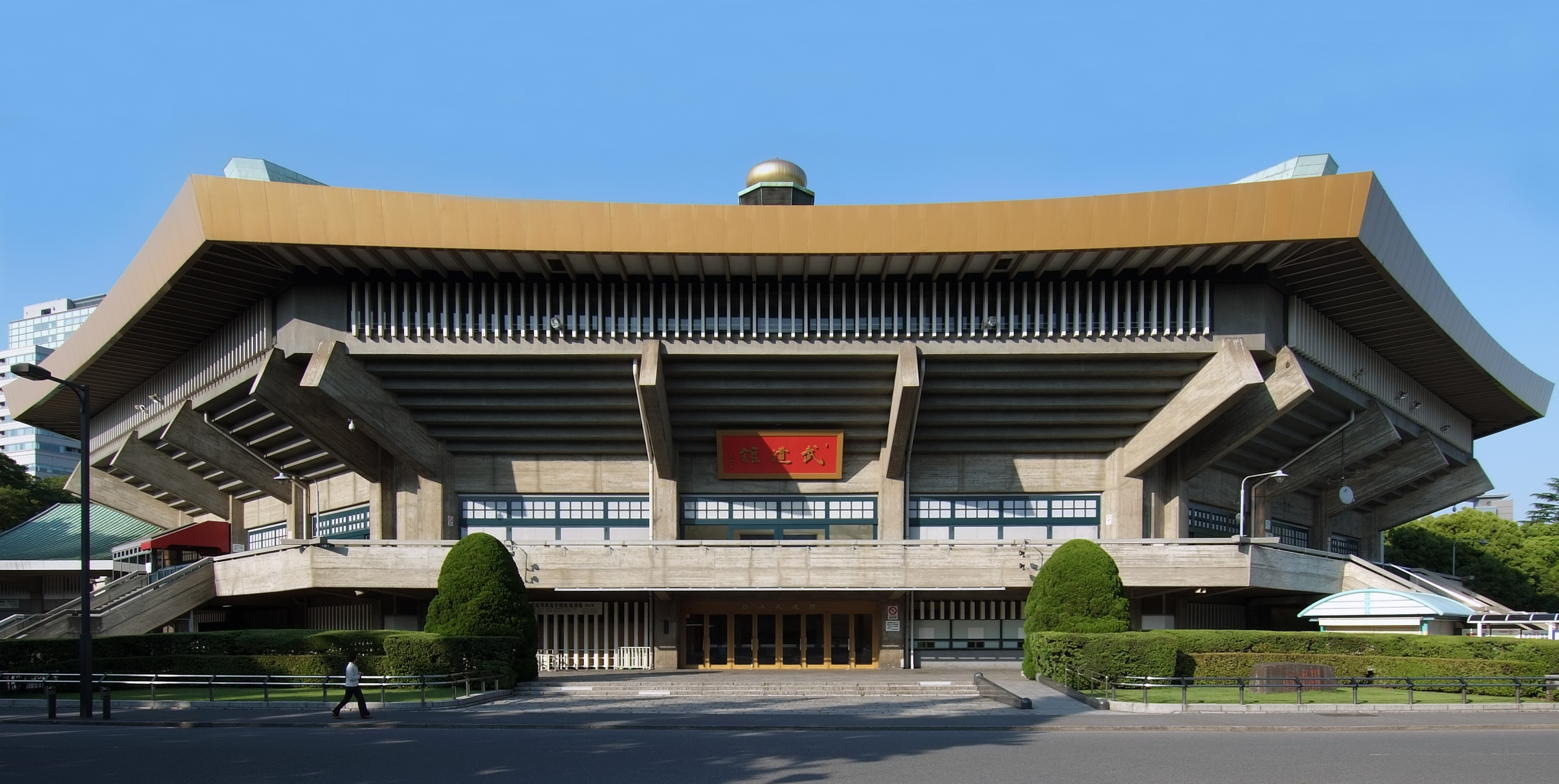
The Faith Tour began in Tokyo, Japan at the Budokan arena.

On 30 October 1987, George Michael released his debut solo studio album, Faith. After receiving a 1988 Brit Award for "Best British Male" at the Royal Albert Hall in London, Michael embarked on a massive sold-out world tour which would occupy most of that year. It started in Tokyo's Budokan indoor arena on 19 February and ended at Pensacola Civic Center in Pensacola, Florida, on 31 October. Most of the set list was based on the Faith track listing with a couple of songs from Wham! ("Everything She Wants" and "I'm Your Man"). Michael also paid a tribute to artists that he had been influenced by such as "Lady Marmalade" by Labelle, Wild Cherry's "Play That Funky Music" and Stevie Wonder's "Love's in Need of Love Today". When Michael performed at Birmingham's NEC Arena, former Wham! bandmate Andrew Ridgeley joined him briefly onstage for a performance of "I'm Your Man". With already two US number ones, new singles continued to be released while on tour, with "One More Try" and "Monkey" reaching number 1 in late May and August 1988 on the US Billboard Hot 100.

On 11 June 1988, Michael performed three songs including Gladys Knight's "If You Were My Woman" for the Nelson Mandela 70th Birthday Tribute at Wembley Stadium. Michael used the concert as preparation for a show later the same day at London's Earls Court.

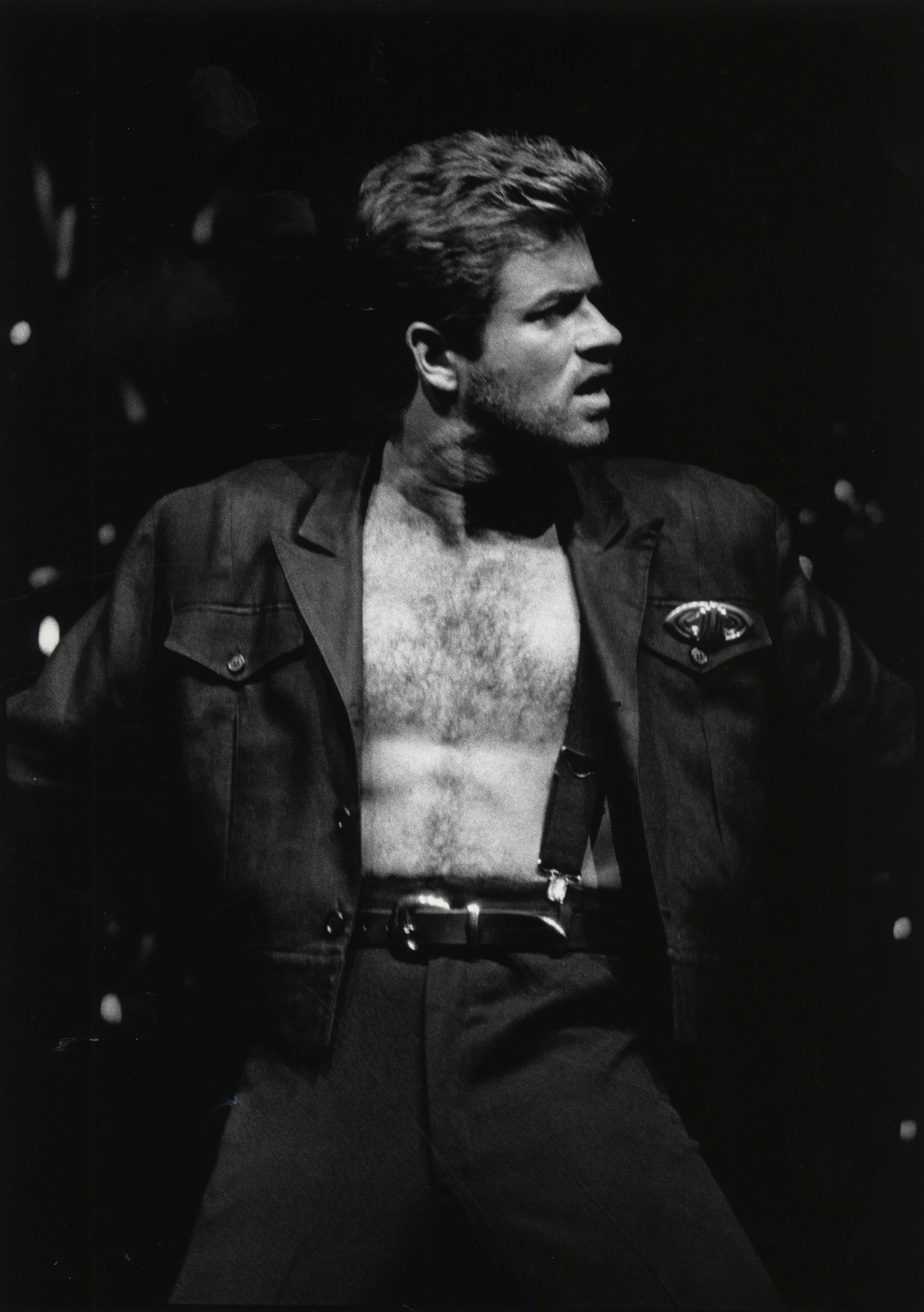
Michael performing in Houston during the tour.

For the first five months, Michael had consulted eight doctors in a variety of countries for throat pain which had caused some concert cancellations. Eventually in London he was diagnosed with a cyst in the throat. The demanding schedule took a pause for Michael to recuperate. In August 1988, Michael toured the United States beginning in Landover, Maryland and closing late October in Pensacola, Florida. During the 29 August performance in Auburn Hills, Michigan, Michael was joined on stage by Aretha Franklin for a duet on "I Knew You Were Waiting (For Me)".

The 43-date American tour alone grossed a total of $15 million (about $40.8 million in today's dollars), performing to over 750,000 fans. Michael also topped the Billboard Year-End of 1988 charts in the US with Faith and single of the same title. According to RIAA, he was the top-selling artist of the year 1988 in the United States.

=== Last European dates ===
In early July 1989, nine months after the tour ended, Michael performed three special concerts (shows in Spain had been previously cancelled) at Madrid's Las Ventas, La Rosaleda Stadium, Málaga and Sarrià Stadium in Barcelona.

== Recordings and release ==
=== Concert film ===
On 10 March 2026, George Michael Entertainment announced the release of a concert film entitled George Michael: The Faith Tour, which will premiere in theatres worldwide later that year. The footage – which was shot during the two consecutive performances at the Palais Omnisports de Paris-Bercy in Paris on 30 and 31 May 1988 – was "assembled from a 14-camera shoot captured on 35mm film across two nights", and was "newly restored and remastered" for the release. Directed by Andy Morahan and David Austin, the theatrical release of the film will be opened by a short film by Mary McCartney entitled Finding Faith, which will feature unseen photographs of Michael by American photographer Herb Ritts, as well as behind-the-scenes footage from the music video shoot for "Faith".

=== Live album ===
An accompanying 18-track live album recorded at the Palais Omnisports de Paris-Bercy from the same dates entitled The Faith Tour was also released on 6 November 2026. Eleven tracks from the 31 May performance were previously broadcast in 1988 on several radio stations in several countries including Westwood One networks company.

=== Broadcasts ===
The 1 July 1989 performance at the Plaza de Toros de Las Ventas in Madrid was recorded and broadcast live on television channel TVE1 in Spain and various European and Latin American countries.

== Opening acts ==
- Deon Estus (North America, selected dates)
- The Bangles (North America, selected dates)
- Johnny Clegg & Savuka (Toronto)

== Set list ==
1988

First leg

1. "I Want Your Sex"
2. "Hard Day"
3. "Love's in Need of Love Today"
4. "Everything She Wants"
5. "Father Figure"
6. "I'm Your Man"
7. "A Different Corner"
8. "Faith"
9. "Monkey"
10. "Hand to Mouth"
11. "One More Try"
12. "I Knew You Were Waiting (For Me)"
13. "Careless Whisper"
14. "I Want Your Sex "
15. "Lady Marmalade"

Second leg

1. "I Want Your Sex"
2. "Hard Day"
3. "Everything She Wants"
4. "I'm Your Man"
5. "A Different Corner"
6. "Love's in Need of Love Today"
7. "Father Figure"
8. "One More Try"
9. "Faith"
10. "I Knew You Were Waiting (For Me)"
11. "Careless Whisper"
12. "Lady Marmalade"
13. "I Want Your Sex"

Third leg

1. "I Want Your Sex (Part I)"
2. "Hard Day"
3. "Father Figure"
4. "I'm Your Man"
5. "Love's in Need of Love Today"
6. "Everything She Wants"
7. "A Different Corner"
8. "Faith"
9. "Monkey"
10. "Hand to Mouth"
11. "Play That Funky Music"
12. "One More Try"
13. "I Knew You Were Waiting (For Me)"
14. "Careless Whisper"
15. "Lady Marmalade"
16. "I Want Your Sex (Part II & III)"

Fourth leg

1. "I Want Your Sex"
2. "Faith"
3. "Hard Day"
4. "Everything She Wants"
5. "I'm Your Man"
6. "A Different Corner"
7. "Love's in Need of Love Today"
8. "Father Figure"
9. "One More Try"
10. "I Knew You Were Waiting (For Me)"
11. "Lady Marmalade"
12. "Careless Whisper"

1989

1–6 July 1989

=== Madrid ===
1. "Faith (intro)"
2. "I Want Your Sex"
3. "Hard Day"
4. "Father Figure"
5. "Calling You"
6. "Everything She Wants"
7. "Faith"
8. "I'm Your Man"
9. "A Different Corner"
10. "Love's in Need of Love Today"
11. "One More Try"
12. "I Knew You Were Waiting (For Me)"
13. "Lady Marmalade"
14. "Careless Whisper"

=== Barcelona ===
1. "I Want Your Sex" (Part I & II)
2. "Hard Day"
3. "Calling You"
4. "Everything She Wants"
5. "Father Figure"
6. "I'm Your Man"
7. "Pastime Paradise"
8. "Faith"
9. "Monkey"
10. "One More Try"
11. "I Knew You Were Waiting (For Me)"
12. "Careless Whisper"
13. "Lady Marmalade"
14. "I Want Your Sex (Part I, II & III)"

== Tour dates ==
List of concerts, showing date, city, country, venue, tickets sold, number of available tickets, and amount of gross revenue
Date	City	Country	Venue	Attendance	Gross
Asia
19 February 1988	Tokyo	Japan	Nippon Budokan		
20 February 1988	Tokyo	Japan	Nippon Budokan		
21 February 1988	Tokyo	Japan	Nippon Budokan		
23 February 1988	Osaka	Japan	Osaka-Jo Hall		
24 February 1988	Osaka	Japan	Osaka-Jo Hall		
26 February 1988	Nagoya	Japan	Aichi Prefectural Gymnasium		
Oceania
4 March 1988	Auckland	New Zealand	Western Springs Stadium		
8 March 1988	Auckland	New Zealand	Western Springs Stadium		
9 March 1988	Perth	Australia	Perth Entertainment Centre		
11 March 1988	Adelaide	Australia	Memorial Drive Park		
12 March 1988	Adelaide	Australia	Memorial Drive Park		
13 March 1988	Canberra	Australia	Bruce Stadium		
14 March 1988	Canberra	Australia	Bruce Stadium		
17 March 1988	Sydney	Australia	Sydney Entertainment Centre		
18 March 1988	Sydney	Australia	Sydney Entertainment Centre		
19 March 1988	Sydney	Australia	Sydney Entertainment Centre		
24 March 1988	Brisbane	Australia	Brisbane Entertainment Centre		
26 March 1988	Melbourne	Australia	Melbourne Sports and Entertainment Centre		
27 March 1988	Melbourne	Australia	Melbourne Sports and Entertainment Centre		
28 March 1988	Melbourne	Australia	Melbourne Sports and Entertainment Centre		
2 April 1988	Melbourne	Australia	Melbourne Sports and Entertainment Centre		
North America
5 April 1988	Honolulu	United States	Blaisdell Arena	14,799 / 14,799	$320,108
6 April 1988	Honolulu	United States	Blaisdell Arena	14,799 / 14,799	$320,108
Europe
12 April 1988	Rotterdam	Netherlands	Rotterdam Ahoy		
13 April 1988	Rotterdam	Netherlands	Rotterdam Ahoy		
14 April 1988	Rotterdam	Netherlands	Rotterdam Ahoy		
16 April 1988	Rotterdam	Netherlands	Rotterdam Ahoy		
18 April 1988	Paris	France	Zénith de Paris		
21 April 1988	Oslo	Norway	Drammenshallen		
22 April 1988	Gothenburg	Sweden	Scandinavium		
23 April 1988	Gothenburg	Sweden	Scandinavium		
9 May 1988	Frankfurt	West Germany	Festhalle		
11 May 1988	Munich	West Germany	Olympiahalle		
12 May 1988	Vienna	Austria	Wiener Stadthalle		
16 May 1988	Milan	Italy	Milan Arena		
17 May 1988	Milan	Italy	Milan Arena		
20 May 1988	Rome	Italy	Palazzo dello Sport		
21 May 1988	Verona	Italy	Stadio Marcantonio Bentegodi		
23 May 1988	Zürich	Switzerland	Hallenstadion		
24 May 1988	Zürich	Switzerland	Hallenstadion		
26 May 1988	Lyon	France	Palais des Sports de Gerland		
27 May 1988	Montpellier	France	Le Zénith		
30 May 1988	Paris	France	Palais Omnisports de Paris-Bercy		
31 May 1988	Paris	France	Palais Omnisports de Paris-Bercy		
2 June 1988	Hamburg	West Germany	Sporthalle Hamburg		
3 June 1988	Hamburg	West Germany	Sporthalle Hamburg		
10 June 1988	London	England	Earls Court		
11 June 1988	London	England	Earls Court		
12 June 1988	London	England	Earls Court		
14 June 1988	London	England	Earls Court		
15 June 1988	London	England	Earls Court		
16 June 1988	London	England	Earls Court		
18 June 1988	Glasgow	Scotland	SECC Hall 4		
19 June 1988	Glasgow	Scotland	SECC Hall 4		
23 June 1988	Birmingham	England	NEC Arena		
24 June 1988	Birmingham	England	NEC Arena		
25 June 1988	Birmingham	England	NEC Arena		
North America
6 August 1988	Landover	United States	Capital Centre	29,331 / 29,331	$586,620
7 August 1988	Landover	United States	Capital Centre	29,331 / 29,331	$586,620
9 August 1988	Philadelphia	United States	The Spectrum	31,725 / 31,725	$611,612
10 August 1988	Philadelphia	United States	The Spectrum	31,725 / 31,725	$611,612
11 August 1988	Hartford	United States	Hartford Civic Center		
14 August 1988	New York City	United States	Madison Square Garden	51,312 / 51,312	$1,129,905
15 August 1988	New York City	United States	Madison Square Garden	51,312 / 51,312	$1,129,905
16 August 1988	New York City	United States	Madison Square Garden	51,312 / 51,312	$1,129,905
19 August 1988	Mansfield	United States	Great Woods Center		
20 August 1988	Mansfield	United States	Great Woods Center		
21 August 1988	East Rutherford	United States	Brendan Byrne Arena	18,704 / 18,704	$360,961
23 August 1988	Montreal	Canada	Stade Olympique	21,640 / 35,000	$520,701
25 August 1988	Ottawa	Canada	CCE		
27 August 1988	Toronto	Canada	CNE Stadium	45,289 / 45,289	$996,287
29 August 1988	Auburn Hills	United States	The Palace of Auburn Hills	33,822 / 33,822	$676,440
30 August 1988	Auburn Hills	United States	The Palace of Auburn Hills	33,822 / 33,822	$676,440
1 September 1988	Pittsburgh	United States	Civic Arena	14,189 / 14,189	$252,001
2 September 1988	Richfield	United States	Richfield Coliseum	23,984 / 23,984	$479,680
3 September 1988	Richfield	United States	Richfield Coliseum	23,984 / 23,984	$479,680
6 September 1988	Rosemont	United States	Rosemont Horizon	28,724 / 28,724	$646,290
7 September 1988	Rosemont	United States	Rosemont Horizon	28,724 / 28,724	$646,290
9 September 1988	East Troy	United States	Alpine Valley Music Theatre	20,302 / 20,302	$388,944
11 September 1988	Lexington	United States	Rupp Arena	17,674 / 17,674	$353,480
13 September 1988	Saint Paul	United States	St. Paul Civic Center	15,678 / 15,678	$305,721
17 September 1988	Greenwood Village	United States	Fiddler's Green Amphitheatre	28,386 / 36,000	$515,607
18 September 1988	Greenwood Village	United States	Fiddler's Green Amphitheatre	28,386 / 36,000	$515,607
22 September 1988	Tacoma	United States	Tacoma Dome	45,240 / 45,240	$891,900
23 September 1988	Tacoma	United States	Tacoma Dome	45,240 / 45,240	$891,900
25 September 1988	Vancouver	Canada	Pacific Coliseum	13,596 / 13,596	$320,403
27 September 1988	Mountain View	United States	Shoreline Amphitheatre	40,606 / 42,952	$735,710
28 September 1988	Mountain View	United States	Shoreline Amphitheatre	40,606 / 42,952	$735,710
29 September 1988	Mountain View	United States	Shoreline Amphitheatre	40,606 / 42,952	$735,710
2 October 1988	Inglewood	United States	The Forum	42,382 / 42,382	$902,768
3 October 1988	Inglewood	United States	The Forum	42,382 / 42,382	$902,768
4 October 1988	Inglewood	United States	The Forum	42,382 / 42,382	$902,768
7 October 1988	Irvine	United States	Irvine Meadows Amphitheatre	43,936 / 45,000	$1,007,600
8 October 1988	Irvine	United States	Irvine Meadows Amphitheatre	43,936 / 45,000	$1,007,600
9 October 1988	Irvine	United States	Irvine Meadows Amphitheatre	43,936 / 45,000	$1,007,600
11 October 1988	San Diego	United States	San Diego Sports Arena	11,700 / 11,700	$247,659
14 October 1988	Irving	United States	Texas Stadium	38,564 / 41,000	$846,923
16 October 1988	Houston	United States	The Summit	13,256 / 15,000	$308,893
18 October 1988	New Orleans	United States	Louisiana Superdome	24,000 / 30,000	$450,555
20 October 1988	Atlanta	United States	Atlanta–Fulton County Stadium		
23 October 1988	Orlando	United States	Citrus Bowl	34,547 / 35,000	$667,840
26 October 1988	Tampa	United States	Expo Hall	10,288 / 10,288	$223,322
29 October 1988	Miami	United States	Orange Bowl	34,439 / 35,000	$663,400
31 October 1988	Pensacola	United States	Pensacola Civic Center	9,274 / 9,274	$178,386
Europe
1 July 1989	Madrid	Spain	Plaza de Toros de Las Ventas		
4 July 1989	Málaga	Spain	Estadio La Rosaleda		
6 July 1989	Barcelona	Spain	Estadi de Sarrià		

Cancellations and rescheduled shows

29 February 1988	Yokohama, Japan	Yokohama Cultural Gymnasium	Cancelled
21 March 1988	Sydney, Australia	Sydney Entertainment Centre	Cancelled
23 March 1988	Brisbane, Australia	Brisbane Entertainment Centre	Cancelled
30, 31 March 1988	Melbourne, Australia	Melbourne Sports and Entertainment Centre	Cancelled
25 April 1988	Helsinki, Finland	Jäähalli	Cancelled
27, 28 April 1988	Copenhagen, Denmark	Valby-Hallen	Cancelled
29, 30 April 1988	Hamburg, West Germany	Sporthalle Hamburg	Cancelled
2 May 1988	West Berlin, West Germany	Deutschlandhalle	Cancelled
4 May 1988	Dortmund, West Germany	Westfalenhalle	Cancelled
6 May 1988	Frankfurt, West Germany	Festhalle	Cancelled
7 May 1988	Stuttgart, West Germany	Schleyer-Halle	Cancelled
14 May 1988	Verona, Italy	Verona Arena	Cancelled. Concert rescheduled to 21 May 1988
18 May 1988	Genova, Italy	PalaSport	Cancelled
1 June 1988	Paris, France	Palais des Sports	Cancelled
5 June 1988	Dortmund, West Germany	Westfalenhalle	Cancelled
6 June 1988	Stuttgart, West Germany	Schleyer-Halle	Cancelled
29 June 1988	Belfast, Northern Ireland	King's Hall	Cancelled
1 July 1988	Dublin, Ireland	Royal Dublin Society	Cancelled
8 July 1988	Copenhagen, Denmark	Valby-Hallen	Cancelled
10 July 1988	Leysin, Switzerland	Leysin Rock Festival	Cancelled
12 July 1988	Antwerp, Belgium	Sportpaleis	Cancelled
15 July 1988	Rotterdam, Netherlands	Feijenoord Stadion	Cancelled
18 July 1988	Viareggio, Italy	Sports Stadium	Cancelled
20, 21 July 1988	Fréjus, France	Arènes de Fréjus	Cancelled
23 July 1988	Barcelona, Spain	Estadi de Sarrià	Cancelled. Concert rescheduled to 6 July 1989
27, 28 July 1988	Madrid, Spain	Plaza de Toros de Las Ventas	Cancelled. Concert rescheduled to 1 July 1989

== Personnel ==
As printed in the official tour programme:

- George Michael – Lead vocals
- Chris Cameron – Musical Director
- Carlos Rios – Guitarist
- Deon Estus – Bassist
- Moyes Lucas – Drummer
- Tony Patler – Keyboards
- Andy Hamilton – Saxophone
- Lynn Mabry – Vocalist
- Eric Henderson/Art Palmer – Dancers
- Lippmann Kahane Entertainment – Management
- Jake Duncan – Tour Manager
- Albert Lawrence – Production Manager
- Jonathan Smeeton/Shawn Richardson – Lighting Designers
- Benji Lefevre – Sound Engineer
- Chris Porter – Sound Co-ordinator
- Mark Fisher/Jonathan Park – Stageset Designer
- Gerry Raymond Barker – Stage Manager
- Ian Tucker – Lighting Crew Chief
- Chris Wade Evans – Monitor Engineer
- Bob Weber – Head Carpenter
- Michael Garabedian – Carpenter
- Dean Hart/Steve Olean – Riggers
- Siobhan Bailey – Asst. to George Michael
- Rusty Hooker – Tour Accountant
- Triad – Agency
- Nick Sizer – Drum Technician
- Adrian Wilson – Guitar Technician
- Gary Hodgson – Keyboard Technician
- Wells Christie III – Programming Technician
- Ronnie Franklin/Bill Greer – Security Officers
- Melanie Panayiotou – Hair
- Kathy Jeung/Melanie Panayiotou – Make Up
- Michael Putland/Chris Cuffaro – Tour Photographers
- Alan Keyes – Wardrobe Master
- Debra De Luca – Asst. Tour Manager
- Paul Corkill – Fitness Trainer
- Michael Deissler/Alastair Walsh – Laser Technicians
- Brian Latt/John Brant – Color Ray Technicians
- Lori Goldklang – Management Assistant
- Deirdre Pratt – Tour Manager Assistant
- Showco INC. – Sound
- Samuelsons – Lighting
- VARI*LITE INC. – Moving Lights
