= Chris Cuffaro =

American photographer

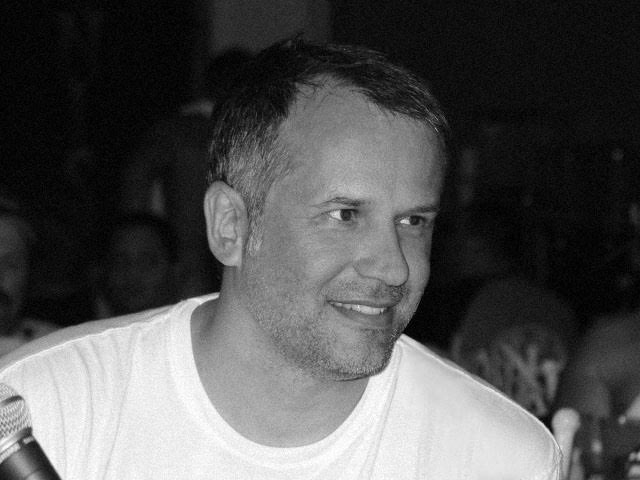
- Born: April 14, 1960 (age 65); San Jose, California
- Awards: Outstanding Photographer - 1978 - San Jose High School
- Website: cuffarophoto.com

Chris Cuffaro (born April 14, 1960) is an American photographer. Primarily known for his portraits of musicians, Cuffaro has photographed Michael Hutchence, Henry Rollins, George Michael, George Harrison and Jane's Addiction, among others. He was closely associated with the Seattle rock scene of the early 1990s, and frequently photographed artists including Nirvana and Pearl Jam.

Cuffaro made several music videos. Most notably, he directed the first video for the Pearl Jam song "Jeremy." Although Pearl Jam's label supported the effort - Cuffaro and Eddie Vedder had become friends—the label ultimately shelved the black-and-white video, instead commissioning a more commercial video when "Jeremy" was released as a single in 1991.

Composed of 100 photographs, the first exhibition of Cuffaro's photography was held in Los Angeles in 1992 at Ministry. In 2011, work began on Cuffaro's Greatest Hits,an exhibit based on Cuffaro's 50-year career as a photographer. The first exhibition was in Los Angeles at Tower Records in 2017. The exhibitions will be accompanied by a documentary.

== Exhibitions ==
- Ministry: Los Angeles, 1992: Cuffaro's first music photography exhibition was at Ministry Cafe on La Brea Ave. in Los Angeles.
- Greatest Hits: Los Angeles, 2017: Greatest Hits: Los Angeles was a retrospective celebrating the work of Cuffaro, held at Tower Records on Sunset Blvd. in Hollywood, CA.
- Greatest Hits: Martini Ranch, 2017: took place at Musichead Gallery on Sunset Blvd. in Hollywood, and celebrated the 30th Anniversary of James Cameron’s music video "Reach" for the band Martini Ranch.
- Greatest Hits: George Michael, 2018: held at Black Eye Gallery in Sydney, Australia. The exhibition included images from 1987 for the FAITH video through 1988 for the FAITH Tour. Cuffaro shot the publicity shoot for the label and still photography for George’s music videos including Faith, Monkey, One More Try, Father Figure and Kissing a Fool.
- Greatest Hits: Grunge, 2019: at Blender Gallery in Sydney, Australia. The exhibition included images of Pearl Jam, Nirvana, Soundgarden, Alice In Chains, Mudhoney and Chris Cornell.
- Greatest Hits: Pearl Jam, 2019: took place at Musichead Gallery in Los Angeles, California, and showed images of Pearl Jam from 1991 to 1992.
- Greatest Hits: Michael Hutchence, 2019: took place at Blender Gallery in Sydney, Australia. The exhibition included images of Hutchence taken in 1993 for Detour magazine.
- Greatest Hits: Jane's Addiction, 2022: took place at Musichead Gallery in Los Angeles, California. Included images of Jane's Addiction from 1989-1991.
- Greatest Hits: Australia, 2022: took place at Behind the Gallery in Sydney, Australia. Included the best of the best of his Greatest Hits.
- Greatest Hits: New Zealand, 2023: took place at Indigo Studios and presented by AgentX Publicity in Auckland, New Zealand. Included the best of the best from his Greatest Hits.
- Greatest Hits: Pearl Jam | Alive 1991-1992, 2024: Melbourne & Sydney, Australia. Presented by Behind the Gallery. The exhibition included images of Pearl Jam from 1991-1992.
- Greatest Hits: George Michael | One Night Only, 2024: Sydney, Australia. Presented by Behind the Gallery and at The Carrington Hotel.
- Greatest Hits: George Michael vs Michael Hutchence, 2025, Melbourne, Australia. A collection of iconic images from both icons presented by Behind the Gallery.
- Greatest Hits: Proof Sheets, 2025, At Lunar Studios in Sydney, Australia. Exhibition included Proof Sheets from many iconic photos of icons.
