= List of Billboard 200 number-one albums of 1988 =

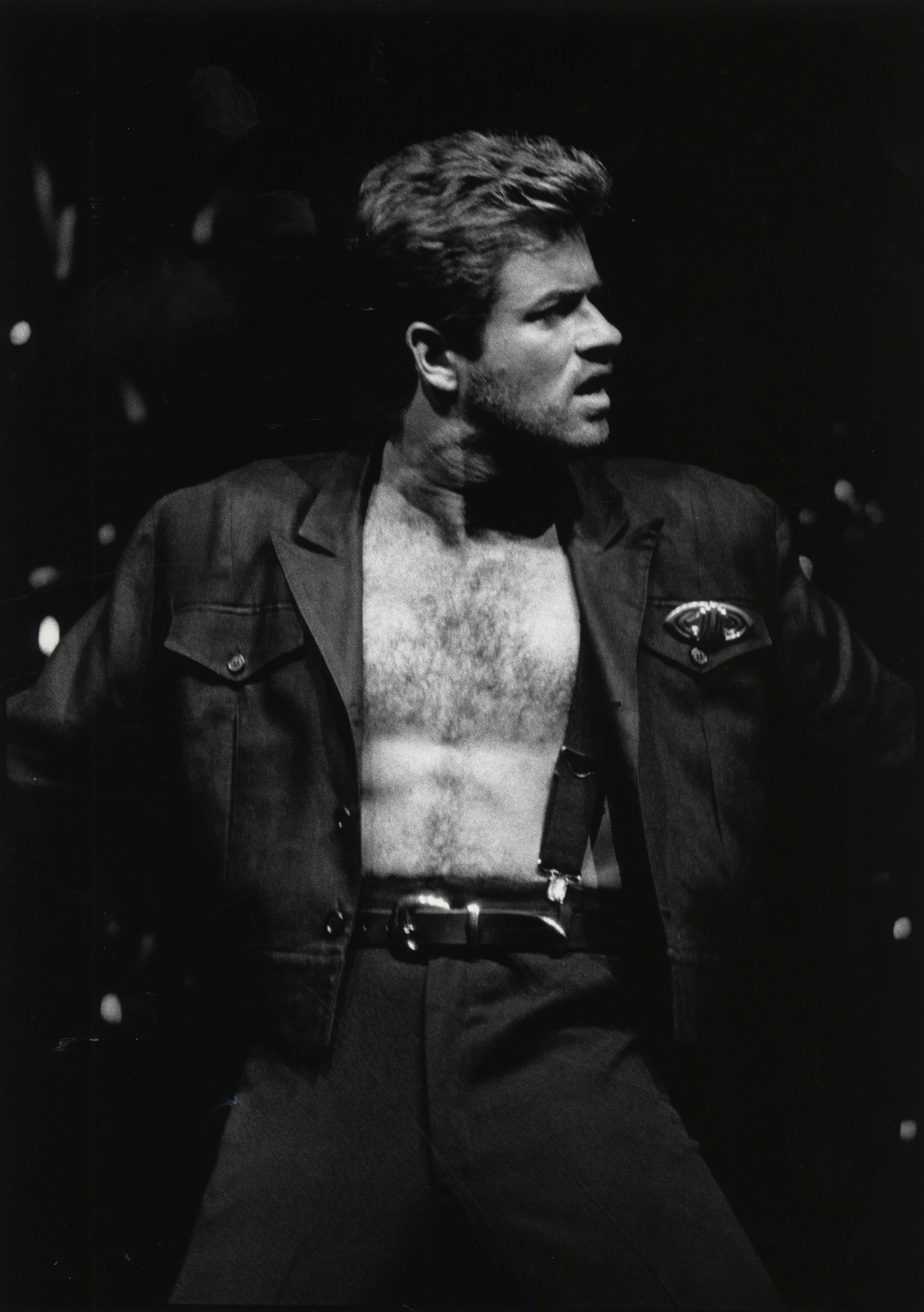
George Michael has topped the Billboard Year-End of 1988 charts in the U.S. with his album Faith and single of the same title. According to RIAA, he was the top-selling artist of the year 1988 in the United States.

The highest-selling albums and EPs in the United States are ranked in the Billboard 200, which is published by Billboard magazine. The data are compiled by Nielsen Soundscan based on each album's weekly physical and digital sales. In 1988, 11 albums advanced to the peak position of the chart.

The beginning of the year started with the continuation of Dirty Dancing but was bumped out of the number one spot by Pop singer George Michael's first solo album Faith. It had the longest run among the releases, spending 12 non-consecutive weeks in the top position. The album was also notable for reaching the Top R&B/Hip-Hop Albums (U.S. Hot Black Singles) at number-one making it the first album by a Caucasian artist to hit the top spot on that chart, mainly due to the R&B/funk-leaning singles that were released from the album, most notably, "One More Try", "I Want Your Sex" and "Father Figure". Faith was the best-selling album of 1988 in the United States, and eventually reached Diamond certification by the RIAA. Closely behind Faith, the Dirty Dancing soundtrack spent 11 non-consecutive weeks in the top position. From its August 1987 release, it spent a total of 18 weeks at #1 on the Billboard 200 and went platinum eleven times.

Guns N' Roses' debut album, Appetite for Destruction, was their first number one album on the Billboard 200, and is one of the best selling albums in the U.S., being certified diamond (plus 18× platinum) by the RIAA.

Van Halen, Bon Jovi, and U2 each garnered their second number-one albums on the Billboard 200, while Tiffany, Def Leppard, Anita Baker, and Steve Winwood garnered their first.

== Chart history ==
Key
†	Indicates best performing album of 1988

Issue date	Album	Artist(s)	Label	Ref.
January 2	Dirty Dancing	Soundtrack	RCA	
January 9	Dirty Dancing	Soundtrack	RCA	
January 16	Faith †	George Michael	Columbia/Epic	
January 23	Tiffany	Tiffany	MCA	
January 30	Tiffany	Tiffany	MCA	
February 6	Faith †	George Michael	Columbia/Epic	
February 13	Faith †	George Michael	Columbia/Epic	
February 20	Faith †	George Michael	Columbia/Epic	
February 27	Faith †	George Michael	Columbia/Epic	
March 5	Faith †	George Michael	Columbia/Epic	
March 12	Dirty Dancing	Soundtrack	RCA	
March 19	Dirty Dancing	Soundtrack	RCA	
March 26	Dirty Dancing	Soundtrack	RCA	
April 2	Dirty Dancing	Soundtrack	RCA	
April 9	Dirty Dancing	Soundtrack	RCA	
April 16	Dirty Dancing	Soundtrack	RCA	
April 23	Dirty Dancing	Soundtrack	RCA	
April 30	Dirty Dancing	Soundtrack	RCA	
May 7	Dirty Dancing	Soundtrack	RCA	
May 14	Faith †	George Michael	Columbia/Epic	
May 21	Faith †	George Michael	Columbia/Epic	
May 28	Faith †	George Michael	Columbia/Epic	
June 4	Faith †	George Michael	Columbia/Epic	
June 11	Faith †	George Michael	Columbia/Epic	
June 18	Faith †	George Michael	Columbia/Epic	
June 25	OU812	Van Halen	Warner Bros.	
July 2	OU812	Van Halen	Warner Bros.	
July 9	OU812	Van Halen	Warner Bros.	
July 16	OU812	Van Halen	Warner Bros.	
July 23	Hysteria	Def Leppard	Mercury	
July 30	Hysteria	Def Leppard	Mercury	
August 6	Appetite for Destruction	Guns N' Roses	Geffen	
August 13	Hysteria	Def Leppard	Mercury	
August 20	Roll with It	Steve Winwood	Virgin	
August 27	Tracy Chapman	Tracy Chapman	Elektra	
September 3	Hysteria	Def Leppard	Mercury	
September 10	Hysteria	Def Leppard	Mercury	
September 17	Hysteria	Def Leppard	Mercury	
September 24	Appetite for Destruction	Guns N' Roses	Geffen	
October 1	Appetite for Destruction	Guns N' Roses	Geffen	
October 8	Appetite for Destruction	Guns N' Roses	Geffen	
October 15	New Jersey	Bon Jovi	Mercury	
October 22	New Jersey	Bon Jovi	Mercury	
October 29	New Jersey	Bon Jovi	Mercury	
November 5	New Jersey	Bon Jovi	Mercury	
November 12	Rattle and Hum	U2 / Soundtrack	Island	
November 19	Rattle and Hum	U2 / Soundtrack	Island	
November 26	Rattle and Hum	U2 / Soundtrack	Island	
December 3	Rattle and Hum	U2 / Soundtrack	Island	
December 10	Rattle and Hum	U2 / Soundtrack	Island	
December 17	Rattle and Hum	U2 / Soundtrack	Island	
December 24	Giving You the Best That I Got	Anita Baker	Elektra	
December 31	Giving You the Best That I Got	Anita Baker	Elektra	

== See also ==
- 1988 in music
- List of number-one albums (United States)
- List of best-selling albums
- List of best-selling albums in the United States
