= Lloyd Johnson (businessman) =

English fashion entrepreneur

Lloyd William Johnson
- Born: 23 May 1945 (age 81); Enfield, Middlesex, England
- Occupation: fashion entrepreneur

Lloyd William Johnson (born 23 May 1945 in Enfield, Middlesex) is an English fashion entrepreneur.

His independent London boutiques created a strong international following among popular music performers and celebrities from the 1960s to the 1990s, including Fred Astaire, Keith Richards, Bob Dylan, Rod Stewart, Jack Nicholson, David Bailey, Jonathan Ross, The Clash, Shakin' Stevens, Madness, George Michael, Iggy Pop, Tom Waits, Fun Lovin Criminals, Oasis and The Pretenders.

Designs from Johnson's labels Cockell & Johnson, Johnson & Johnson, Johnson's The Modern Outfitter and La Rocka! appeared on record sleeves (such as Stewart's 1970 album Gasoline Alley and Madness's 1979 single "One Step Beyond"), in promo videos (George Michael's 1987 "Faith" leather "La Rocka!" jacket), films (Jim Jarmusch's 1986 Down by Law and 1988 Mystery Train) and as stage costumes (David Bowie's 1988 Glass Spider tour).

Simultaneously Johnson's clothes were popular with music fans and fashion followers, particularly after being championed in British style magazines such as The Face. The magazine's founder Nick Logan wrote in 2012: "Lloyd Johnson is up there with the likes of Paul Smith and Joseph Ettedgui in making London what it is today...he is one of the crucial figures in the development of British style. "

In a 2012 interview, Johnson told The Guardian: "My designs were pure rock'n'roll. I created what I saw as stage-wear for the street."

== Early life ==
Johnson was born in Enfield, Middlesex, and raised in Hastings, East Sussex, where he attended Hastings Art School. A mod fashion and music fan, in his teenage years Johnson made his own clothes and also undertook regular shopping expeditions to such late 1950s/early 1960s London boutiques as Vince Man's Shop, Anello & Davide and Sportique, where he bought garments on behalf of himself and his circle of friends.

== Career ==
In 1966 Johnson worked at London menswear stores Cecil Gee and The Cue Shop, the newly launched boutique within traditional retailer Austin Reed. He and Hastings friend Patrick Cockell (son of the British heavyweight boxer Don Cockell) operated an extra-curricular business making and selling 'slash-end' ties to such new outlets as Granny Takes a Trip and Michael Rainey's Hung on You.

When these sold well and were sported by such groups as The Move, the pair launched the small outlet Heavy Metal Kids within the newly opened multi-stall Kensington Market in 1967. Silver-painted and accessed via an oval doorway into which a giant silver plug was fitted at the end of the day's trading, HMK retailed casual leather jackets and velvet jeans by the French NewMan brand.

== Cockell and Johnson ==
In 1968, they moved to a larger site within Kensington Market and renamed the business Cockell & Johnson Est. 1968 (taking off traditional high-end menswear businesses such as Jermyn Street's Turnbull & Asser).

Over the next five years the Cockell & Johnson dandy peacock look – three-piece tailored suits, long herringbone coats, penny-round collared repeat-print shirts and print jackets – was taken up by the pop stars of the day, including Stewart (who wore red velvet C&J jeans and a cream and dark brown leather jacket designed by Johnson and Colin Bennett on the inner gatefold of Gasoline Alley) and his colleague in the Jeff Beck Group and The Faces' Ronnie Wood.

Other customers included members of Argent, The Nice, Unit 4+2 and Queen (whose Roger Taylor and Freddie Mercury were fellow Kensington Market stall-holders).

== Johnson and Johnson ==
In 1973, Johnson parted ways with Cockell and formed a new business from the same premises with his first wife Marian Tidder.

Johnson & Johnson's Pop Art print approach to jackets and shirts earned the label a place in the V&A's 1974 travelling exhibition The Fabric of Pop. A jacket featuring a print of Fred Astaire's face from the 1935 film Top Hat attracted the attention of the movie-star's daughter Ava, who obtained one for her father. Astaire subsequently sent Johnson a photograph of himself wearing it.

Johnson withdrew from own-label clothes as a result of the impact of the mid-1970s recession on British manufacturing, and with new partner Peter Boutwood repurposed the shop with dead-stock clothing from the 1940s to the 1960s.

These clothes found popularity with style-conscious younger customers, some of whom would become involved in the punk and New Romantic movements, including British broadcaster Robert Elms, writer Paul Gorman, guitarist Marco Pirroni and Vic Goddard of Subway Sect, who told the Punk77 website: "Just before punk started we were frequenting Lloyd Johnson's stall in Kensington Market, where we could buy original demob suits for £5 a time. "

== Johnson's The Modern Outfitter ==
In 1978 Boutwood and Johnson opened a second London outlet, at 406 King's Road, in the Chelsea neighbourhood World's End.

A commission to supply designs to Franc Roddam's film Quadrophenia (from The Who's concept album of the same name) led to re-entry into the own-label market with a series of 1960s-style clothing collections which revisited Johnson's mod past.

These were snapped up by followers of the Ska/mod revival Two Tone movement. Musicians such as Paul Weller, Madness and The Specials all wore Johnson's clothing of this period.

In 1979 Johnson launched the label La Rocka! to cater to another style subculture, 1950s enthusiasts for rockabilly and original rock & roll. This was championed by a strong association with the US trio The Stray Cats and set the scene for the rest of the decade of subsequent collections which recast 1950s and 1960s clothing for the 1980s via such sub-labels as Beat-Beat and Mex-Tex.

In the late 70s and early 80s, Billy Duffy of Theatre of Hate and The Cult worked as an assistant at the shop. In an interview to promote his autobiography, Marco Pirroni of Rema Rema and Adam & The Ants stated that he worked very briefly in the shop, explaining that besides his career in music, it was the only job he ever had.

The Rock & Roll Suicide collection used Japanese imagery and prints effectively; performers who favoured this clothing included singer Siouxsie (on the cover of The Face), The Clash frontman Joe Strummer (who wore a 'Kanji' shirt for a 1982 concert in Tokyo) and Billy Idol (on the sleeve of his single "Hot in the City"). The complementary range of 'Jive Bomber' leather jackets were sported by such rock & rollers as Keith Richards.

George Michael made his Johnson's BSA "Rockers Revenge" leather jacket and silver-tipped boots key elements of the visual identity portrayed on the cover of his Faith album, the music video for the spin-off single and accompanying world tour. Michael also wore a Johnson's denim/leather jacket in the promo video for his 1987 single with Aretha Franklin, "I Knew You Were Waiting (For Me)".

By 1988, demand for Johnson's clothing was high enough to justify the opening of a third outlet in Endell Street in central London fashion district Covent Garden.

Inspired by exposure to the West Coast lounge scene, in the early 1990s Johnson produced clothing for the British easy-listening crowd, including three-button Italian suits in sharkskin and Regency-collared outfits in crushed velvet, matched with giant 'Teddy bear' fake fur coats (as worn by Robbie Williams in the promo for Take That's 1995 single "Back For Good").

== Johnson's Notting Hill ==
After parting company with Boutwood, Johnson maintained the Chelsea and Kensington stores and opened a new shop at 293 Portobello Road in west London's Notting Hill; the premises had housed the militaria boutique I Was Lord Kitchener's Valet in the 1960s.

Again inspired by visits to California, the Portobello boutique was given a Tiki-theme with a bamboo frontage in line with the revival of this 1950s Polynesian subculture. The store included a record shop selling exotica run by DJ Jay Strongman and a juice bar. Among popular lines were appliqué-d short sleeved shirts, worn by such performers as Fun Lovin' Criminals.

== Later life ==
As the British independent fashion sector was ravaged by the rise of large multiple chains, Johnson retired from retailing after closing his three shops in 1999–2000.

Johnson remains active consulting and providing talks to fashion students and 1960s fans. For the first half of the 2000s Johnson and his wife Jill licensed designs to such global brands as BC Ethic, and in recent years his extensive knowledge of the Ivy League style has been recognised by such online fora as Film Noir Buff. With Chris Hardy he now sells vintage Ivy League wear and makes new limited edition clothing runs that are accurate to this style as Hardy & Johnson.

== Personal life ==
Lloyd married Marian Tidder in spring 1972 in Brentwood, Essex. After being in partnership as Johnson & Johnson, they divorced. He subsequently married Jill Fleming (born 15 February 1956) in 1985 in Wandsworth Registry Office. Shortly after they had a daughter, Ruby Winifred Elizabeth Johnson (born 5 August 1985).

== Exhibition ==
Between 25 January and 3 March 2012 London gallery Chelsea Space hosted the retrospective exhibition Lloyd Johnson: The Modern Outfitter. The exhibition was curated by one-time customer, author Paul Gorman.

== La Rocka! 79 ==
Lloyd and Jill Johnson revived the La Rocka! label as La Rocka 79 in 2014.

== La Rocka! USA ==
In 2016, Lloyd Johnson and Joe De Lorenzo released t-shirts include many original La Rocka! designs as well as other artists and genres.
