= Hand to Mouth (song) =

Song by George Michael

from the album Faith
- A-side: "Faith"
- Released: 30 October 1987
- Recorded: 1987
- Studio: Sarm West (London)
- Genre: Pop
- Length: 4:36
- Label: Epic; Columbia
- Songwriter: George Michael
- Producer: George Michael

Official visualiser
- "Hand to Mouth" on YouTube

"Hand to Mouth" is a song by English singer-songwriter George Michael, released as the sixth track on his debut solo studio album, Faith (1987).

== Production ==
=== Writing ===
"Hand to Mouth" was written, arranged and produced by George Michael. According to Michael, the genesis of the song began around the time of the Los Angeles freeway shootings in 1987. "What happened was one day there was a trafic jam, this guy got out of his car and blew someone else's brains out. The next day it was in the papers and a week later everyone was doing it," Michael said. Those incidents prompted Michael (who had been in Los Angeles at the time) to start writing a song about "all the bad things happening in America", titled "Gun Control".

The week following Michael's return to England, the Hungerford massacre took place in Wiltshire and Berkshire. Said Michael, "Can you imagine what would've happened if I'd come out with that song?" Instead, he decided to rewrite the song with the sociopolitical situation in the UK and the US in mind. In a 2010 interview with Mark Goodier, Michael confirmed that the song was "all about Thatcher and Reagan really."

=== Recording ===
Recording sessions for "Hand to Mouth" took place at Sarm West Studio 2 in Notting Hill, London. The song features a contribution from percussionist Andy Duncan, who was contacted by engineer Chris Porter to propose ideas for the track at Michael's request. Among Duncan's contributions to the song is a bongo drum track, which is present during the outro. According to Duncan, "When I arrived at Studio 2, there was a guide vocal, the keyboard pad was there and the drums were there." The drum machine used on "Hand to Mouth" is a Linn 9000.

== Critical reception ==
In a retrospective review of Faith for The Daily Telegraph, writer Neil McCormick commented on "Hand to Mouth" saying, "Smoothly slipped in among the sex and broken hearts is a slippery song about social conscience, featuring gun-toting vigilantes, desperate prostitutes and starving babies. The theme of faith (or lack of it) resurfaces in a chorus about the 'Gods of America' who 'believe in nothing', leaving the singer praying 'with empty hands'." Reviewing the album for Pitchfork, Ivy Nelson stated that on "Hand to Mouth", Michael displays "an evolving social consciousness that seems inherited directly from Stevie Wonder and Marvin Gaye, characters and their cyclical struggles spilling through a cityscape of wavering synths."

== Personnel ==
Personnel taken from Faith liner notes.

- George Michael – vocals, keyboards, bass, arranger, producer
- Hugh Burns – guitar
- Andy Duncan – percussion
