= I'm Your Man =

I'm Your Man may refer to:

== Books ==
- I'm Your Man: The Life of Leonard Cohen, a 2012 biography by Sylvie Simmons

== Film ==
- I'm Your Man (1992 film), an American interactive short film
- I'm Your Man (2021 film), a German drama film
- Leonard Cohen: I'm Your Man, a 2005 American documentary

== Music ==
=== Albums ===
- I'm Your Man (Jason Sellers album) or the title song (see below), 1997
- I'm Your Man (Leonard Cohen album) or the title song (see below), 1988

=== Songs ===
- "I'm Your Man" (2PM song), 2011
- "I'm Your Man" (Barry Manilow song), 1986
- "I'm Your Man", a song by Jason Sellers song from the 1997 eponymous album
- "I'm Your Man" (Leonard Cohen song), 1988
- "I'm Your Man" (Wham! song), 1985
- "Come See Me" (The Pretty Things song), 1966, a.k.a. "I'm Your Man"
- "I'm Your Man", by Enrique Iglesias from Enrique, 1999
- "I'm Your Man", by Guy Sebastian from T.R.U.T.H., 2020
- "I'm Your Man", by Richard Hell and the Voidoids from Blank Generation, 1990 reissue

== See also ==
- "I Am Your Man", a 1968 song by Bobby Taylor & the Vancouvers
- "I Am Your Man", a 2009 song by Seal
