= Monkey (song) =

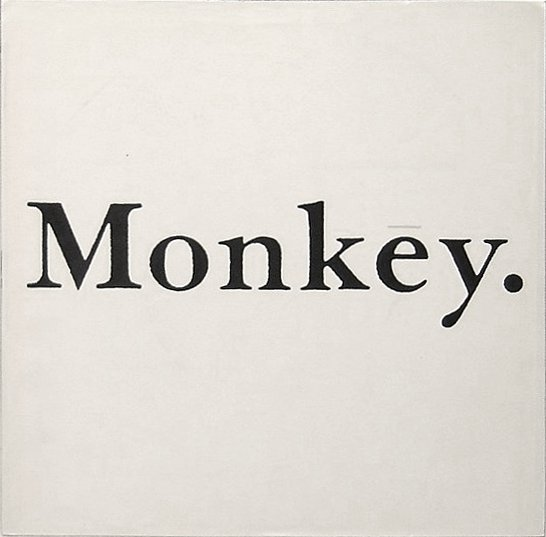

Single by George Michael

from the album Faith
- B-side: "Monkey" (a cappella)
- Released: 4 July 1988
- Recorded: 1987
- Genre: Dance-pop; dance-rock
- Length: 5:02 (album version); 4:45 (single version); 8:06 (extended version)
- Label: Columbia; Epic
- Songwriter: George Michael
- Producers: George Michael; Jimmy Jam and Terry Lewis

George Michael singles chronology
"One More Try" (1988)	"Monkey" (1988)	"Kissing a Fool" (1988)

Music video
- "Monkey" on YouTube

"Monkey" is a song by the English singer and songwriter George Michael. It was released as a single in 1988 and reached number-one on the US Billboard Hot 100 and number 13 on the UK singles chart. "Monkey" debuted at number 42 on 9 July 1988, reaching number-one for two weeks, beginning on 27 August 1988.

"Monkey" became Michael's sixth solo single reaching number-one in the US, and the fourth single to do so from the Faith album. Michael joined Michael Jackson and Whitney Houston as three artists who all had four or more consecutive number one singles during 1987–88 (Jackson scored five number-one hits from a single album (Bad) while Houston scored seven consecutive number-one hits from two albums).

"Monkey" also reached number-one in the US Hot Dance Club Play chart for two weeks and became his first dance number-one. When the song was released as a single, the single version was remixed by Jimmy Jam and Terry Lewis.

== Background ==
In a retrospective interview about the Faith album in 2010, Michael noted that "Monkey" was inspired by a friend of his dealing with drug and alcohol addiction but he did not know how to help her. He used the term "monkey" to refer to her addiction, asking his friend: "Do you love the monkey or do you love me?"

== Critical reception ==
Pan-European magazine Music & Media wrote, "One of the most overtly funky, disco-oriented tracks on the LP Faith. A hard hitting dance number."

== Music video ==
The official music video for the song was directed by Andy Morahan and choreographed by Paula Abdul. It comprises footage from the performances at the Palais Omnisports de Paris-Bercy arena during the Faith Tour. It includes scenes of Michael performing intense choreography and him performing the song in a simple white button down shirt slightly unbuttoned and black hat against a white background. Some of the scenes are shown in grey scale, with the tour footage being shown with tinted blue lights all over.

== Track listings ==
All tracks are written by George Michael.

7″: Epic / EMU 6 (UK)
No.	Title	Length
1.	"Monkey" (7-inch edit)	4:47
2.	"Monkey" (a cappella)	3:40

CD: Epic / CD EMU 6 (UK)
No.	Title	Length
1.	"Monkey" (extended version)	8:06
2.	"Monkey" (a cappella)	3:40
3.	"Monkey" (extra beats)	3:30
4.	"Monkey" (7-inch edit)	4:47

12″: Columbia / 44 07849 (US)
No.	Title	Length
1.	"Monkey" (extended version)	8:06
2.	"Monkey" (a cappella)	3:40
3.	"Monkey" (extra beats)	3:30

Promo CD: Columbia / CSK 1186 (US)
No.	Title	Length
1.	"Monkey" (7-inch edit)	4:47
2.	"Monkey" (extended version)	8:06
3.	"Monkey" (a cappella)	3:40
4.	"Monkey" (instrumental)	5:30
5.	"Monkey" (extra beats)	3:30
6.	"Monkey" (dub version)	5:20

== Personnel ==
Personnel taken from Faith liner notes.

- George Michael – vocals, all other instruments, arranger, producer
- Robert Ahwai – guitar
- Roddy Matthews – guitar

== Charts ==
=== Weekly charts ===
Chart (1988)	Peak position
Australia (ARIA)	12
Austria (Ö3 Austria Top 40)	22
Belgium (Ultratop 50 Flanders)	5
Canada Top Singles (RPM)	1
Canada Dance/Urban (RPM)	5
Canada (The Record's Retail Singles Chart)	6
Europe (European Hot 100 Singles)	23
Finland (Suomen virallinen lista)	4
France (SNEP)	34
Iceland (RÚV)	18
Ireland (IRMA)	8
Italy Airplay (Music & Media)	6
Japan (Oricon)	90
Netherlands (Dutch Top 40)	6
Netherlands (Single Top 100)	7
New Zealand (Recorded Music NZ)	9
Spain (PROMUSICAE)	23
Switzerland (Schweizer Hitparade)	5
UK Singles (Official Charts)	13
US Billboard Hot 100	1
US Dance Club Songs (Billboard)	1
US Hot R&B/Hip-Hop Songs (Billboard)	8
West Germany (GfK)	24

=== Year-end charts ===
Chart (1988)	Position
Belgium (Ultratop Flanders)	69
Netherlands (Dutch Top 40)	93
Netherlands (Single Top 100)	83
Tokyo (Tokio Hot 100)	88
US Billboard Hot 100	45

== See also ==
- List of number-one dance singles of 1988 (U.S.)
