= Kissing a Fool (song) =

Single by George Michael

from the album Faith
- B-side: "Kissing a Fool" (instrumental); "A Last Request (I Want Your Sex Part 3)"
- Written: Early 1985
- Released: 21 November 1988
- Recorded: 1987
- Studio: Sarm West (London)
- Genre: Sophisti-pop; jazz
- Length: 4:35
- Label: Columbia; Epic
- Songwriter: George Michael
- Producer: George Michael

George Michael singles chronology
"Monkey" (1988)	"Kissing a Fool" (1988)	"Praying for Time" (1990)

Music video
- "Kissing a Fool" on YouTube

"Kissing a Fool" is a song written and performed by English singer and songwriter George Michael, released on 21 November 1988 by Columbia Records and Epic Records as the seventh and final single from his debut studio album, Faith (1987). It was the least successful single from the album, reaching number 18 on the UK singles chart and becoming the first single in five not to reach number one on the Billboard Hot 100 in the US. However, it reached number one on the Hot Adult Contemporary Tracks chart and became a number 5 hit on the Billboard Hot 100, being regarded critically as one of his most vulnerable recordings and one of his best ballads. In 2021, BBC Radio 2 listeners voted "Kissing a Fool" as number 15 in their top 40 George Michael songs.

"Kissing a Fool" was Michael's last single for almost two years in the United Kingdom. It was later covered by Michael Bublé on his self-titled album and released as a single in the United States, where it reached number 29 on the Billboard Adult Contemporary chart.

== Production ==
=== Writing ===
In an interview published in the December 1987 issue of International Musician and Recording World magazine, Michael remembers writing "Kissing a Fool" en route to Japan for Wham!'s 1984 tour (referring to the Big Tour) in early 1985. However, much like other songs Michael was writing at the time, it couldn't be used for Wham! due to certain restrictions in the duo's image; a solo album would be the best chance to use it (which, in that case, turned out to be the Faith album more than two years later).

Michael elaborated on the writing of "Kissing a Fool":

I don't think I've ever been influenced by other friends as to who I should or shouldn't go out with. "Kissing a Fool" isn't really about that. It's about a relationship I had with someone who couldn't handle the situation because of who I was, George Michael. At the time it did surprise me. First I hadn't realized how much I'd achieved and secondly I hadn't realized it could have its limitations. I write it in that swing style because I think that period of music had that feeling of resignation. It's very much a late night giving up feeling.

=== Recording ===
The recording sessions for "Kissing a Fool" took place at Sarm West Studio 2 in Notting Hill, London. According to Michael, the vocals were recorded a cappella in one take.

== Composition ==
A sophisti-pop and jazz ballad with minimal instrumentation, "Kissing a Fool" features arrangement by English film composer John Altman. Aside from Michael's vocals, the song employs piano, guitar, bass, drums and a brass section. It is composed in the key of E♭ major, and Michael's vocal range spans B♭_{3} to B♭_{5}.

== Track listings ==
All tracks are written by George Michael.

7″: Epic / EMU 7 (UK)
No.	Title	Length
1.	"Kissing a Fool"	4:34
2.	"Kissing a Fool" (instrumental)	4:34

12″: Epic / EMU T7 (UK)
No.	Title	Length
1.	"Kissing a Fool"	4:34
2.	"Kissing a Fool" (instrumental)	4:34
3.	"A Last Request (I Want Your Sex Part 3)"	3:47

== Personnel ==
Personnel taken from Faith liner notes.

- George Michael – vocals, bass, arranger, producer
- Hugh Burns – guitar
- Lee Fothergill – guitar
- Chris Cameron – piano
- Ian Thomas – drums
- John Altman – saxophone
- Mark Chandler – trumpet
- Malcolm Griffiths – trombone
- Steve Sidwell – trumpet
- Paul Spong – trumpet
- Jamie Talbot – alto saxophone
- Rick Taylor – trombone
- Steve Waterman – trumpet

== Charts ==
=== Weekly charts ===
George Michael version
Chart (1988–1989)	Peak position
Australia (ARIA)	55
Belgium (Ultratop 50 Flanders)	10
Canada (The Record's Retail Singles Chart)	7
Europe (European Hot 100 Singles)	41
France (SNEP)	45
Germany (GfK)	44
Ireland (IRMA)	9
Netherlands (Dutch Top 40)	13
Netherlands (Single Top 100)	13
Spain (PROMUSICAE Top 40 Radio)	28
UK Singles (Official Charts)	18
US Billboard Hot 100	5
US Adult Contemporary (Billboard)	1
US Hot R&B/Hip-Hop Songs (Billboard)	33
US Cash Box Top 100	4

Michael Bublé version
Chart (2003)	Peak position
US Adult Contemporary (Billboard)	29

=== Year-end charts ===
Chart (1988)	Position
Canada	61
US Billboard Hot 100	91
