= Hard Day =

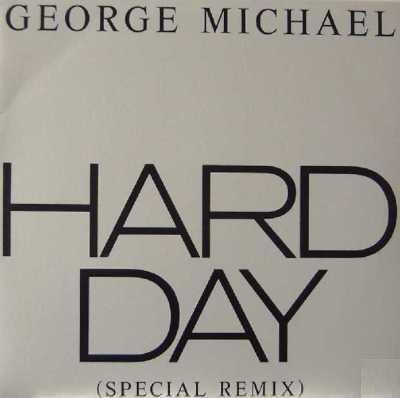

Single by George Michael

from the album Faith
- B-side: "I Want Your Sex" (Monogamy mix)
- Released: 30 October 1987
- Recorded: 1987
- Genre: Electro-funk; dance-pop
- Length: 4:48 (album version); 4:11 (radio edit); 8:31 (The Shep Pettibone remix)
- Label: Columbia; Epic
- Songwriter: George Michael
- Producer: George Michael

George Michael singles chronology
"Faith" (1987)	"Hard Day" (1987)	"Father Figure" (1987)

"Hard Day" is a song by British singer and songwriter George Michael from his debut studio album, Faith (1987). It was released on 30 October 1987 by Columbia Records in the United States as the album's third single. The song was written and originally produced by Michael, and was released solely in the U.S. and Australia, where it was released by Epic Records. No music video was made for the song. The lyrics are apparently addressed to a woman which the singer is obsessed with; in the final verse, Michael voices her by altering his own voice, in the same style as Prince's imaginary alter ego Camille.

"Hard Day" reached the top five on the US Hot Dance Club Songs chart and the top 40 on the US Hot R&B/Hip-Hop Songs chart. The 12-inch single was backed with the extended mix of "I Want Your Sex". "Hard Day" was also released as the B-side of the earlier "I Want Your Sex" 12-inch single.

== Track listing ==
All tracks are written by George Michael.

US and Australian 12-inch single
No.	Title	Length
1.	"Hard Day" (The Shep Pettibone remix)	8:31
2.	"Hard Day" (radio edit)	4:11
3.	"I Want Your Sex" (Monogamy mix)	13:11

== Personnel ==
Personnel taken from Faith liner notes.

- George Michael – vocals, all instruments, arranger, producer

== Charts ==
Chart (1987)	Peak position
US Dance Club Songs (Billboard)	5
US Hot R&B/Hip-Hop Songs (Billboard)	21

== Release history ==
Region	Date	Format(s)	Label(s)	Ref.
United States	30 October 1987	12-inch vinyl	Columbia	
Australia	1 February 1988	12-inch vinyl	Epic	
