= I Want Your Sex =

Single by George Michael

from the album Faith and Beverly Hills Cop II (The Motion Picture Soundtrack Album)
- B-side: "I Want Your Sex" ("Rhythm Two: Brass in Love") (7″); "Hard Day" (12″)
- Released: 18 May 1987
- Recorded: August 1986 (part 1); February 1987 (parts 2 and 3)
- Studio: Sarm West (London) [part 1]; Puk (Gjerlev, Denmark) [parts 2 and 3]
- Genre: Pop-funk; electro-funk; minimalist
- Length: 4:44 (part one); 4:43 (part two); 3:48 (part three); 13:13 (Monogamy mix)
- Label: Columbia; Epic
- Songwriter: George Michael
- Producer: George Michael

George Michael singles chronology
"I Knew You Were Waiting (For Me)" (1987)	"I Want Your Sex" (1987)	"Faith" (1987)

Music video
- "I Want Your Sex" on YouTube

"I Want Your Sex" is a song by English singer and songwriter George Michael. Released as a single on 18 May 1987 in the United States and on 1 June in the United Kingdom, it was the third hit from the soundtrack to Beverly Hills Cop II and the first single from Michael's debut solo album Faith.

The single was certified platinum by the RIAA for shipments in excess of one million copies in the United States. It was also the recipient for Golden Raspberry Award for Worst Original Song. The song's radio airplay on the BBC was restricted to post-watershed hours due to concerns that it might promote promiscuity and could be counterproductive to contemporary campaigns about AIDS awareness.

== Background ==
From 1981 to 1986, George Michael was a member of the pop duo Wham!, alongside Andrew Ridgeley. The group had released three studio albums – Fantastic (1983), Make It Big (1984) and Music from the Edge of Heaven (1986) – and enjoyed a string of success, with four of their singles reaching number one on the UK singles chart. Following Michael's desire to create music targeted at a more adult market, Wham! split up amicably in 1986, performing their farewell concert at the Wembley Stadium on 28 June.

Michael's debut solo single, "Careless Whisper", was released in July 1984. The song reached number one in the UK, and received Michael a nomination for Songwriter of the Year at 1985's Ivor Novello Awards, which he won. In 1986, Michael released his second solo single, "A Different Corner".

== Composition ==
"I Want Your Sex" has been described as pop-funk, electro-funk, and minimalist. "I Want Your Sex" has three separate parts dubbed "Rhythms". The first one, titled "Rhythm One: Lust", is the version released as a single and banned by the BBC. It appears by itself on the Beverly Hills Cop II soundtrack, and mixed with the second version, titled "Rhythm Two: Brass in Love", on Faith. The second Rhythm also appears by itself as the B-side of the single. A third part, "Rhythm Three: A Last Request", appears as a B-side to the "Kissing a Fool" 12-inch single, and on the CD edition of Faith as a bonus track. All three versions were mixed together into one 13-minute song, dubbed the "Monogamy Mix", for the 12-inch and CD single releases.

== Writing and production ==
=== Part 1 ===
Part 1 of "I Want Your Sex" was recorded in August 1986 at Sarm West Studio 2 in Notting Hill, London, roughly two months after the Wham! split that June. The track started out as a "much faster [p]op song" that Michael had written, called "Johnny Sex". The song was produced for Michael's childhood friend David Austin, for whom Michael had already produced a single – "Turn to Gold" – in 1984.

During sessions, a MIDI issue caused the drum machine to trigger random sounds off the used Roland Juno-106 and Yamaha DX7 synthesizers, which resulted in a "squelching, pulsing" bass sound. According to engineer Chris Porter, "We were working on a song [called 'Johnny Sex'], again we just had a Juno, LinnDrum and DX7, and we connected them all up so that we could run them off MIDI. After doing some programming, we returned to the studio the next afternoon, I pressed 'play' on the tape machine, the MIDI obviously wasn't right and everything started making these weird noises." This "pumping noise" inspired Michael to write a new song – "I Want Your Sex" – from scratch. Said Michael, "I thought it sounded really good, really tribal, and it gave me a totally different idea which I worked around, I just played the other stuff and had it sequenced."

Eventually, Michael decided to keep "I Want Your Sex" for himself. It was written entirely in the studio, with Michael playing all the instruments: a LinnDrum, a Roland Juno-106, a Yamaha DX7, and a Greengate DS3 sampler. Michael explained why he wrote the track this way in an issue of International Musician and Recording World magazine:

I didn't want to write a song as such. I wanted to make a record. When it comes to making dance records I'm much more able to do them as I go along in the studio, because it's much more about sound and rhythm. I deliberately wanted to make a record where if you stripped it down to what was left of the song, there wasn't much of a song there.

Michael admitted that the track was "really easy to do", but it was difficult in the sense that he intended it to be a dance record, so he "had to do something new with it every 16 bars" for the song's arrangement to "hold up interest-wise".

=== Parts 2 and 3 ===
Parts 2 and 3 of "I Want Your Sex" were recorded in early 1987 during sessions at Puk Recording Studios in Gjerlev, Denmark, as extensions to part 1, which had already been selected for the first single. According to assistant engineer Paul Gomersall, "When we got to Puk, George just said, 'I've got this song...' as if nothing had happened."

Part 2, being the one with a "more New York club sound", was recorded with a seven-piece brass section, while part 3 was the "romantic" and "altogether smoother" counterpart. For the crossover points, the 56-channel Solid State Logic (SSL) console (with 28 channels on either side) at the Puk facility would be used to bounce from the original multitrack on one side of the SSL onto the new multitrack slave on the other, and Michael would rehearse the musicians on a particular part before dropping them in on the new track.

== Music video ==
The music video, directed by Andy Morahan, featured Michael and his then-girlfriend Kathy Jeung to emphasize that he was in a monogamous relationship; at one point, he is shown using lipstick to write the words "explore" on her thigh, and "monogamy" on her back, which is photographed and retouched at the end of the video to reveal the phrase "explore monogamy". Spanish model Gloria Rodríguez Veiga was also used for naked scenes in a way that allowed the audience to assume they were the same woman; these shots are interspersed with intentionally blurred footage of Michael dancing and singing the song.

In a 2004 interview with Adam Mattera for UK magazine Attitude, Michael reflected: "It was totally real. Kathy was in love with me but she knew that I was in love with a guy at that point in time. I was still saying I was bisexual... She was the only female that I ever brought into my professional life. I put her in a video. Of course she looked like a beard. It was all such a mess, really. My own confusion and then on top of that what I was prepared to let the public think."

The video generated controversy over its sexual themes. In 2002, MTV2's countdown of MTV's Most Controversial Videos Ever to Air on MTV included the video for "I Want Your Sex" at number three. The original video cut appears on the Twenty Five compilation 2-DVD set.

== Release ==
In the US, the song was first featured on the Beverly Hills Cop II soundtrack album, which was released to radio stations in early May 1987. The commercial release of the soundtrack followed on 18 May. An immediate surge in airplay of "I Want Your Sex" as an album cut prompted CBS to release the single the same day. The UK single debuted the first week of June.

"I Want Your Sex" was the second single Michael released in 1987, following "I Knew You Were Waiting (For Me)", his duet with Aretha Franklin. On the song's daytime radio ban, Michael commented during an interview with Jonathan Ross:

I wasn't expecting the blanket ban. I think it's unfair because it's the first ban of its kind in a long time and I think that if I were not George Michael then I would have no problem being played on those stations. And it's incredibly irritating having a record out for a couple of weeks and knowing that people haven't heard it.

Despite censorship and airplay issues, an edited version of the song's music video received ample airplay on North American music channels, fueling its popularity there. The single eventually reached number two on both the US Billboard Hot 100 chart and the US Cash Box Top 100. It also hit number two in Canada, where it ended up becoming the 13th most popular single of the year.

The song reached number three on the UK Singles Chart, where the song's reprise maintained an audience for many years thanks to BBC Radio 1 breakfast show host Simon Mayo using a looped version as backing music for his daily feature On This Day in History. It also sold 327,160 copies there.

== Legacy ==
Although it was one of Michael's biggest hits, the singer ignored the song following its release; he never performed it after the Faith Tour and although the Rhythm Two version appears on Ladies & Gentlemen: The Best of George Michael, it does not appear on the 2006 retrospective Twenty Five; furthermore, the "Monogamy" mix does not appear on the 2011 remastered release of Faith. In an interview with Mark Goodier, included in the large-format book released with the 2011 remaster, Michael said that he still likes the second "Rhythm" but not the first, and that he distanced himself from the song because its production sounded too much like Prince; indeed, "Rhythm 1", as well as a few other tracks on the Faith album (such as "Hard Day"), features Michael simulating female vocals by artificially pitching up and altering his own voice, much the same way as Prince was doing at the time with his pseudo-female alter ego Camille. In the interview, Michael admits that he was "deeply enamoured" with Prince, and adds that he thought it was very bad for him to be infatuated with a colleague of his. Rolling Stone editor David Fricke described "I Want Your Sex" as "a new bump-and-grind original that sounds more like Prince's stark, sexy 'Kiss' than anything in the Wham! catalog".

In 2016, after Michael's death, Andrew Unterberger of Billboard ranked the song number eight on his list of Michael's 15 greatest songs.

== Track listings ==
All tracks are written by George Michael.

7″: Epic / LUST 1 (UK)
No.	Title	Length
1.	"I Want Your Sex" ("Rhythm One: Lust")	4:44
2.	"I Want Your Sex" ("Rhythm Two: Brass in Love")	4:43

12″: Epic / LUST T1 (UK and Europe)
No.	Title	Length
1.	"I Want Your Sex" (“Monogamy Mix”)	13:12
2.	"Hard Day"	4:51

== Personnel ==
Personnel taken from Faith liner notes, and Sound on Sound.

=== Rhythm One: Lust ===
- George Michael – vocals, Roland Juno-106, Yamaha DX7, Greengate DS3, LinnDrum programming, arranger, producer

=== Rhythm Two: Brass in Love ===
- George Michael – vocals, keyboards, guitar, LinnDrum programming, arranger, producer
- Chris Cameron – keyboards
- Danny Schogger – additional keyboards
- Deon Estus – bass guitar
- Steve Sidwell, Paul Spong, Rick Taylor – horns

== Charts ==
=== Weekly charts ===
Weekly chart performance for "I Want Your Sex"
Chart (1987)	Peak position
Australia (Australian Music Report)	2
Austria (Ö3 Austria Top 40)	2
Belgium (Ultratop 50 Flanders)	1
Canada Retail Singles (The Record)	2
Canada Top Singles (RPM)	2
Denmark (IFPI)	3
Europe (European Hot 100 Singles)	3
Finland (Suomen virallinen lista)	2
France (SNEP)	11
Iceland (RÚV)	7
Ireland (IRMA)	1
Italy Airplay (Music & Media)	2
Netherlands (Dutch Top 40)	1
Netherlands (Single Top 100)	1
New Zealand (Recorded Music NZ)	2
Norway (VG-lista)	3
Spain (AFYVE)	4
Sweden (Sverigetopplistan)	8
Switzerland (Schweizer Hitparade)	4
UK Singles (Official Charts)	3
US Billboard Hot 100	2
US Dance Club Songs (Billboard) with "Hard Day"	2
US Dance Singles Sales (Billboard) with "Hard Day"	1
US Hot R&B/Hip-Hop Songs (Billboard)	43
US Cash Box Top 100	2
West Germany (GfK)	3

=== Year-end charts ===
Year-end chart performance for "I Want Your Sex"
Chart (1987)	Position
Australia (Australian Music Report)	32
Austria (Ö3 Austria Top 40)	24
Belgium (Ultratop 50 Flanders)	15
Canada Top Singles (RPM)	13
European Top 100 Singles (Music & Media)	9
Netherlands (Dutch Top 40)	17
Netherlands (Single Top 100)	7
New Zealand (RIANZ)	16
Switzerland (Schweizer Hitparade)	23
UK Singles (OCC)	64
US Billboard Hot 100	24
US 12-inch Singles Sales (Billboard)	14
US Dance Club Play (Billboard)	26
US Hot Crossover Singles (Billboard)	9
US Cash Box Top 100	4
West Germany (Media Control)	18

== Certifications ==
Certifications and sales for "I Want Your Sex"
Region	Certification	Certified units/sales
Canada (Music Canada)	Gold	50,000^{^}
Netherlands (NVPI)	Gold	75,000^{^}
United Kingdom	—	327,160
United States (RIAA)	Platinum	1,000,000^{^}
^{^} Shipments figures based on certification alone.
