= Father Figure (George Michael song) =

Single by George Michael

from the album Faith
- B-side: "Love's in Need of Love Today" (live at Wembley Arena); "Father Figure" (instrumental)
- Released: 28 December 1987
- Recorded: 1987
- Genre: R&B; blue-eyed soul; gospel
- Length: 5:40
- Label: Columbia; Epic
- Songwriter: George Michael
- Producer: George Michael

George Michael singles chronology
"Hard Day" (1987)	"Father Figure" (1987)	"One More Try" (1988)

Music video
- "Father Figure" on YouTube

"Father Figure" is a song by the English singer and songwriter George Michael from his debut studio album, Faith (1987). It was released on 28 December 1987 by Columbia Records and Epic Records as the fourth single from the album. The song reached number one on the US Billboard Hot 100 and number 11 on the UK singles chart. Additionally it was a top five hit in Australia, Belgium, Canada, Iceland, Ireland, the Netherlands and Spain.

== Production ==
"Father Figure" was written entirely in the studio. Originally, the song was envisioned as a dance track. Said Michael, "the initial concept for 'Father Figure' was to make it a kind of mid-tempo dance track. And what happened was I wanted to hear something in my mix so I happened to cut out the snare on the board and suddenly it changed the whole entire mood of the track." The output resulted in a "dreamy" atmosphere, which Michael worked the rest of the song around. "I just thought, well, hey, this is actually much better! So I worked the rest of the feel of the track around this spacey type sound. And it ended up, in my mind, being the most original-sounding thing on the album."

Michael elaborated on the track's origins in an interview with Mark Goodier for the 2011 remastered release of Faith:

It started off with a rhythm track with a snare, and when you play it like that it sounds a bit like Prince. But I must have been listening to it without the snare and gone, "Oh my God, that totally changes the record!" It suddenly becomes a gospel record.

== Composition ==
"Father Figure" is an R&B and blue-eyed soul ballad, and features elements of Egyptian music and gospel music. It is composed in the key of B♭ major, and Michael's vocal range spans D_{4} to G_{5}.

== Chart performance ==
Released in the United Kingdom in December 1987, "Father Figure" reached number eleven on the UK singles chart – the first time Michael had failed to reach the top ten in his home country.

In the United States, "Father Figure" debuted on 16 January 1988 at number 49, while "Faith" was still prominent (at number nine) in the top ten of the chart. "Father Figure" reached number one on 27 February 1988, staying at the top for two weeks. Altogether, the single spent 17 weeks in the chart.

After being prominently featured in Halina Reijn's 2024 erotic thriller Babygirl, the song recharted on the UK Singles Downloads Chart (No. 71) and UK singles chart (No. 73).

== Critical reception ==
Sue Dando from Smash Hits wrote, "Once again, George unveils a blinding talent for wonderful sentiment and swoony lovesome lyrics, all elegantly swathed in pristine 'epic' production and the usual echoey voice-oice which trails-ails off almost every note-ote...It's in a similar 'vein' (though not nearly as good) as 'A Different Corner', it's perfect Radio Two fodder, and it will doubtless be a top ten hit."

In 2017, a Billboard article about the song described it as a "smoky ballad" which alluded to his status as a gay man who had not yet declared his sexuality and was operating during a homophobic time in the music industry and wider society, with journalist Barry Walters saying it "established Michael both as a nuanced grown-up and as a skilled singer-songwriter, able to intertwine racy innuendo and romantic steadfastness". He added that "on the surface, it's a traditional love ballad, the particularly passionate kind George mastered when he wrote 'Careless Whisper'", but that "like his idol and contemporary Prince, George searched for something 'sacred' in sexuality; a healing balm that will protect both him and his beloved. He aims to provide it, both with his reassuring words and steadfast delivery – whispery and intimate during the verses, commanding and declamatory during the chorus." He concluded that the song "allowed George to celebrate forbidden desires without drawing explicit attention to his own [...] Without the elements that nudge the lyric toward off-limits territory, 'Father Figure' would be a far more conventional and much less compelling song. They serve as crucial metaphors that brought George as close as he could to writing from the heart, without alienating much of his audience and the industry."

In 2021, "Father Figure" was included on The Guardian's list of Michael's 30 greatest songs. Ranking the song eighth, reviewer Alexis Petridis opined that "the shift from the hushed longing of the verses to the explosive, gospel-inspired chorus is just fabulous."

== Music video ==
The accompanying music video for "Father Figure" depicts a relationship between a cab driver (Michael) and a high-fashion model (Tania Coleridge). Various intercut flashbacks tell a backstory. Michael and Andy Morahan won "Best Direction of a Video" at the 1988 MTV Video Music Awards for the video.

== Track listings ==
7″: Epic / EMU 4 (UK)
No.	Title	Writer(s)	Length
1.	"Father Figure"	George Michael	5:38
2.	"Love's in Need of Love Today" (live at Wembley Arena, 1 Apr '87)	Stevie Wonder	4:42

7": Columbia / 38-07682 (US)
No.	Title	Length
1.	"Father Figure"	5:37
2.	"Father Figure" (Instrumental)	5:37

CD: Epic / CD EMU 4 (UK and Europe)
No.	Title	Writer(s)	Length
1.	"Father Figure"	Michael	5:38
2.	"Love's in Need of Love Today" (live at Wembley Arena, 1 Apr '87)	Wonder	4:42
3.	"Father Figure" (instrumental)	Michael	5:38

== Personnel ==
Personnel taken from Faith liner notes.

- George Michael – lead and backing vocals, keyboards, arranger, producer
- Shirley Lewis – backing vocals
- Hugh Burns – guitar
- Betsy Cook – additional keyboards

== Charts ==
=== Weekly charts ===
Chart (1988–2016)	Peak position
Australia (Australian Music Report)	5
Austria (Ö3 Austria Top 40)	17
Belgium (Ultratop 50 Flanders)	2
Canada Top Singles (RPM)	2
Canada Adult Contemporary (RPM)	1
Denmark (IFPI)	13
Europe (European Hot 100 Singles)	23
Finland (Suomen virallinen lista)	9
France (SNEP)	37
Germany (GfK)	18
Hungary (Single Top 40)	33
Iceland (Íslenski Listinn Topp 10)	3
Iceland (RÚV)	9
Ireland (IRMA)	2
Italy Airplay (Music & Media)	7
Netherlands (Dutch Top 40)	2
Netherlands (Single Top 100)	2
New Zealand (Recorded Music NZ)	7
Norway (VG-lista)	10
Spain (PROMUSICAE)	4
Switzerland (Schweizer Hitparade)	13
UK Singles (Official Charts)	11
US Billboard Hot 100	1
US Adult Contemporary (Billboard)	3
US Dance Club Songs (Billboard)	13
US Hot R&B/Hip-Hop Songs (Billboard)	6

=== Year-end charts ===
Chart (1988)	Position
Australia	65
Canada Top Singles (RPM)	34
US Billboard Hot 100	27
US Adult Contemporary (Billboard)	33

== Certifications ==
Region	Certification	Certified units/sales
Australia (ARIA)	Gold	35,000^{‡}
New Zealand (RMNZ)	Platinum	30,000^{‡}
United Kingdom (BPI)	Platinum	600,000^{‡}
^{‡} Sales+streaming figures based on certification alone.

== Samples and interpolations ==
- P.M. Dawn – "Looking Through Patient Eyes" (1993)
- LL Cool J – "Father" (1997)
- Destiny's Child – "Winter Paradise" (2001)
- Taylor Swift – "Father Figure" (2025)
