= Faith (George Michael song) =

1987 single by George Michael

Single by George Michael

from the album Faith
- B-side: "Faith" (instrumental); "Hand to Mouth"
- Released: 12 October 1987
- Recorded: May–September 1987
- Studio: Puk (Gjerlev, Denmark); Sarm West (London)
- Genre: Rock and roll; rockabilly; folk-pop
- Length: 3:16; 3:07 (instrumental)
- Label: Columbia; Epic
- Songwriter: George Michael
- Producer: George Michael

George Michael singles chronology
| "I Want Your Sex" (1987) | "Faith" (1987) | "Hard Day" (1987) |

Music video
- "Faith" on YouTube

"Faith" is a song by English singer and songwriter George Michael. Written and produced by Michael, it was released via Columbia Records and Epic Records as the second single from his 1987 debut solo album of the same name. It held the number-one position on the Billboard Hot 100 chart for four weeks and, according to Billboard magazine, was the number-one single of the year in the United States in 1988. The song also reached number one in Australia and Canada and number two on the UK singles chart. The accompanying music video was directed by Andy Morahan. In 2001, "Faith" placed at number 322 on the Songs of the Century list.

== Production ==
As with the rest of the album, "Faith" was written, arranged, and produced by Michael. It is claimed that the idea came from publisher Dick Leahy's suggestion that Michael write a rock and roll pastiche. The song began in May 1987 at Puk Recording Studios in Gjerlev, Denmark, with Michael doing a two-bar LinnDrum loop and Hugh Burns playing the Bo Diddley-style rhythm guitar part on a metal-bodied acoustic guitar. Deon Estus recorded the bass, while the cathedral organ part was recorded with a Yamaha DX7 (although some sources state it is from a Roland D-50).

As with many of his songs, Michael would usually write lyrics in front of the microphone, and build the lead vocal by singing a line, each time he had Chris Porter rewind the tape so he could drop in at certain points to create the right emotional effect. For "Faith", Michael wanted the vocals to be "dry and in-your-face", like on Prince's songs at the time, which Porter noted "had a very tight delay on the vocals, making him sound very growly but dry and aggressive". They recreated the effect with an AMS digital delay.

When Michael decided to release "Faith" as a single, it was extended with a guitar solo. He said: "Everyone said it's great, it's great but it's too short, you know. And everyone kept saying that "I love 'Faith', I love 'Faith'". So I thought, well maybe I should put it out as a single when it came to that. I said, I think a two-minute long single is a bit, you know... so I went in and extended it. But it was originally never intended as a single. It was just gonna be a small track on the album, a really short track."

Work on the song resumed on 1 September 1987, when a new bridge and a 1950s-inspired guitar solo by Burns—played on a Giffin custom Stratocaster—were added at Sarm West Studio 2 in Notting Hill, London. According to Porter, the solo was constructed bar-by-bar over a period of 4 hours in a similar fashion to recording Michael's vocals.

== Composition ==
"Faith" is composed in the key of B major, and Michael's vocal range spans F♯_{4} to G♯_{5}. It incorporates the Bo Diddley beat, a classic rock and roll rhythm. The song begins with a church organ played by Chris Cameron, referencing Wham!'s song "Freedom", followed by guitar strumming, finger clicking, hand-claps, tambourine and hi-hat. "Faith" has been described as a rock and roll, rockabilly, and folk-pop song.

== Music video ==
The official music video for "Faith" was directed by British director Andy Morahan. It features Michael, with noticeable stubble on his face, wearing a La Rocka! black leather jacket with 'Rockers Revenge' and BSA logo, Ray-Ban Aviator sunglasses and a pair of Levi's blue jeans with cowboy boots, playing a guitar near a classic-design Wurlitzer jukebox, and a woman's bare legs. Writers Bob Batchelor and Scott Stoddart say the music video positions him as a "masculine sex object", breaking him up into individual body parts such as "stubbled" [sic] chin and butt.

The music video also features part of another song by Michael. The video starts by playing "I Want Your Sex", and then is interrupted by the jukebox starting into "Faith".

== Chart performance ==
The song reached number one on the US Billboard Hot 100 chart and number two on the UK singles chart for two weeks in late October and early November 1987.

On the Billboard Hot 100 chart, "Faith" went from number 54 to number 37, the week of 31 October 1987. It reached number one on 12 December 1987 and remained there for four consecutive weeks. Altogether, "Faith" stayed in the top 10 for nine weeks, the top 20 for 11 weeks and the top 40 for 15 weeks.

In Canada, it spent 12 weeks at number one, the longest run at the top in the 1980s, according to The Record.

== Track listings ==
All tracks are written by George Michael.

7″: Epic / EMU 3 (UK)
| No. | Title | Length |
|---|---|---|
| 1. | "Faith" | 3:16 |
| 2. | "Hand to Mouth" | 4:36 |

7": Columbia / 38-07623 (US)
| No. | Title | Length |
|---|---|---|
| 1. | "Faith" | 3:14 |
| 2. | "Hand To Mouth" | 4:36 |

12″: Epic / EMU T3 (UK)
| No. | Title | Length |
|---|---|---|
| 1. | "Faith" | 3:16 |
| 2. | "Faith" (instrumental) | 3:07 |
| 3. | "Hand to Mouth" | 4:36 |

== Personnel ==
Credits sourced from Sound on Sound.

- George Michael – lead and harmony vocals, LinnDrum programming, handclaps, fingersnaps, arranger, producer
- Deon Estus – bass guitar
- Hugh Burns – electric and acoustic guitars
- Chris Cameron – Yamaha DX7 (cathedral organ sound)

== Charts ==
=== Weekly charts ===
Weekly chart performance for "Faith"
| Chart (1987–2017) | Peak position |
|---|---|
| Australia (Australian Music Report) | 1 |
| Austria (Ö3 Austria Top 40) | 4 |
| Belgium (Ultratop 50 Flanders) | 1 |
| Canada Retail Singles (The Record) | 1 |
| Canada Top Singles (RPM) | 1 |
| Canada Adult Contemporary (RPM) | 1 |
| Denmark (IFPI) | 2 |
| Europe (European Hot 100 Singles) | 1 |
| Finland (Suomen virallinen lista) | 6 |
| France (SNEP) | 22 |
| Germany (GfK) | 5 |
| Hungary (Single Top 40) | 32 |
| Iceland (RÚV) | 7 |
| Ireland (IRMA) | 2 |
| Italy Airplay (Music & Media) | 12 |
| Japan Hot 100 (Billboard) | 48 |
| Japan (Oricon) | 86 |
| Netherlands (Dutch Top 40) | 1 |
| Netherlands (Single Top 100) | 1 |
| New Zealand (Recorded Music NZ) | 1 |
| Norway (VG-lista) | 3 |
| Portugal (AFP) | 95 |
| Spain (PROMUSICAE) | 3 |
| Sweden (Sverigetopplistan) | 9 |
| Switzerland (Schweizer Hitparade) | 4 |
| UK Singles (Official Charts) | 2 |
| US Billboard Hot 100 | 1 |
| US Adult Contemporary (Billboard) | 5 |
| US Dance Club Songs (Billboard) | 17 |

=== Year-end charts ===
Year-end chart performance for "Faith"
| Chart (1987) | Position |
|---|---|
| Australia (Australian Music Report) | 73 |
| Belgium (Ultratop 50 Flanders) | 23 |
| European Hot 100 Singles (Music & Media) | 68 |
| Netherlands (Dutch Top 40) | 14 |
| Netherlands (Single Top 100) | 15 |
| UK Singles (OCC) | 29 |

| Chart (1988) | Position |
|---|---|
| Australia (ARIA) | 19 |
| Austria (Ö3 Austria Top 40) | 29 |
| Canada Top Singles (RPM) | 33 |
| US Billboard Hot 100 | 1 |

=== All-time charts ===
All-time chart performance for "Faith"
| Chart | Position |
|---|---|
| US Billboard Hot 100 | 150 |

== Certifications ==
Certifications for "Faith"
| Region | Certification | Certified units/sales |
|---|---|---|
| Australia (ARIA) | 2× Platinum | 140,000^{‡} |
| Canada (Music Canada) | Gold | 50,000^{^} |
| Denmark (IFPI Danmark) | Platinum | 90,000^{‡} |
| Italy (FIMI) | Gold | 50,000^{‡} |
| Netherlands (NVPI) | Platinum | 100,000^{^} |
| New Zealand (RMNZ) | 3× Platinum | 90,000^{‡} |
| Spain (Promusicae) | Platinum | 60,000^{‡} |
| United Kingdom (BPI) | 2× Platinum | 1,200,000^{‡} |
| United States (RIAA) | Gold | 500,000^{^} |
^{^} Shipments figures based on certification alone.^{‡} Sales+streaming figures based on certification alone.

== Limp Bizkit version ==
"Faith"

Promotional single by Limp Bizkit

from the album Three Dollar Bill, Yall$
- Released: 31 October 1998
- Recorded: 1997
- Studio: Indigo Ranch Studio (Malibu, California)
- Genre: Nu metal; rap metal
- Length: 2:26
- Label: Flip; Interscope; MCA
- Songwriter: George Michael
- Producers: Ross Robinson; Limp Bizkit

Limp Bizkit singles chronology
| "Sour" (1998) | "Faith" (1998) | "Nookie" (1999) |

Music video
- "Faith" on YouTube

American rap rock band Limp Bizkit covered the song "Faith" in their live performances, using the cover to attract attention to the band. Word of mouth attendance and energetic live performances in which guitarist Wes Borland appeared in bizarre costumes increased the band's cult following. Audiences, in particular, were attracted to Borland's guitar playing and appearance.

Despite the success of the song in Limp Bizkit's live performances, producer Ross Robinson was opposed to recording the cover for their debut album, Three Dollar Bill, Y'all, and tried to persuade the band not to play it on the album. However, the final recording, which incorporated heavier guitar playing and drumming, as well as DJ scratching, impressed Robinson. "I love George Michael and decided to cover 'Faith' for fun. We like to do really aggressive versions of cheesy pop hits," lead singer Fred Durst told Billboard. "I didn't expect him to get busted in that bathroom but his misfortune actually helped us. We couldn't ask for more of a buzz."

Peter Berg directed a music video featuring a bizarre wedding monologue for the song in promotion for its appearance in his film Very Bad Things, but Durst was unsatisfied with it and directed a second video which paid tribute to tourmates such as Primus, Deftones and Mötley Crüe, who appeared in the video. Borland stated in an interview that George Michael, the writer of the song, hated the cover and "hates us for doing it".

In the 2024 film Y2K, Durst (playing himself) sings a newly-recorded acoustic version of the song.
