= Faith (George Michael album) =

Studio album by George Michael
- Released: 30 October 1987
- Recorded: August 1986 – September 1987
- Studios: Puk (Gjerlev, Denmark); Sarm West (London)
- Genres: Pop; funk; R&B; soul; rock; blue-eyed soul
- Length: 58:04 (CD version); 47:45 (LP version)
- Labels: Columbia; Epic
- Producer: George Michael

George Michael chronology
Faith (1987)	Listen Without Prejudice Vol. 1 (1990)

Singles from Faith
- 1. "I Want Your Sex" Released: 18 May 1987; 2. "Faith" Released: 12 October 1987; 3. "Hard Day" Released: 30 October 1987 (US); 4. "Father Figure" Released: 28 December 1987; 5. "One More Try" Released: 11 April 1988; 6. "Monkey" Released: 4 July 1988; 7. "Kissing a Fool" Released: 21 November 1988

Faith is the debut solo studio album by the English singer-songwriter George Michael, released on 30 October 1987 by Columbia Records in the US and on 2 November by Epic Records in the UK. In addition to playing various instruments on the album, Michael wrote and produced every track on the recording except for one, "Look at Your Hands", which he co-wrote with David Austin. A pop album with influences of R&B, funk and soul music, Faith's songs include introspective lyrics, which generated controversies about Michael's personal relationships at that time.

Faith peaked at number one on the UK Albums Chart and US Billboard 200. It stayed for 51 non-consecutive weeks inside the Billboard 200 top 10, including 12 weeks at number one. It was also the first album by a white solo artist to hit number one on the Billboard Top Black Albums chart. Faith spawned four number one singles on the Billboard Hot 100: "Faith", "Father Figure", "One More Try", and "Monkey", making Michael the only British male solo artist to have four number one hits from one album on the Billboard Hot 100. Michael embarked on the Faith Tour to promote Faith in February 1988, opening at Tokyo's Budokan arena, before going on to dates in Australia, Europe and North America.

Faith is one of the best-selling albums of all time, having sold over 25 million copies worldwide, and was certified Diamond by the Recording Industry Association of America in 1996. The album won several awards, including Album of the Year at the 31st Grammy Awards. Michael won three awards at the 1989 American Music Awards: Favorite Pop/Rock Male Artist, Favorite Soul/R&B Male Artist and Favorite Soul/R&B Album. He was also honoured with the MTV Video Vanguard Award. Often ranked as one of the best albums of the 1980s, Faith was ranked number 151 on Rolling Stone's list of the 500 Greatest Albums of All Time in 2020.

== Background ==
By 1986, George Michael had spent five years as the lead singer of the popular duo Wham! and had grown tired of accusations that the group, which featured his best friend Andrew Ridgeley, was nothing more than a teenybopper group despite the serious subject matter that was included on albums such as Fantastic and Make It Big. After the success of Make It Big, Michael had grown weary of continuing the group, and expressed to Ridgeley the desire that they should split up. A decision was made that the group would dissolve following the end of a tenure at Wembley Stadium for what was titled the Final. Following the split, Michael began to work on songs that would eventually make his first solo album, which would be titled Faith. Michael was inspired by his contemporaries Michael Jackson and Prince: "I absolutely wanted to be in the same stratosphere as [Jackson and Prince], definitely. I'd gone from, a couple of years before, being perfectly happy with being on Top of the Pops, to thinking, 'I can do what Michael Jackson can do.' I mean, he'd just done Thriller for fucks sake! I wouldn't have the guts now. I wanted to be in that vein but, mostly, I wanted to make music as good as theirs."

== Recording ==
The album took over a year to make. The first songs to be put together for the album were "I Want Your Sex (Part 1)" and "Look at Your Hands" (working title "Betcha Don't Like It"), recorded in August and September 1986 respectively, at Sarm West Studios in London. Both songs were originally intended for singer David Austin before Michael kept them for his own album. However, it wasn't until February 1987—after six months of little activity—that recording had properly started, this time at the Puk Studios facility, located near Randers, Denmark. The lack of press activity there proved it to be a comfortable environment for Michael to work in without harassment. Songs were usually written by Michael bit by bit in the studio, often with the aid of technology such as drum machines to help create basic rhythms; he would then develop ideas further from there. Rather than using a live rhythm section (as was the case on Wham!'s Make It Big), each instrument was overdubbed in the main studio. Michael would use session musicians to help realise his musical ideas, otherwise he'd try playing a lot (if not, all) of the parts himself, as was the case on "I Want Your Sex (Part 1)", "Hard Day" and "Monkey". The recording sessions at Puk, however, ended in early June shortly after the recording of the title track, "Faith", owing to Michael beginning to suffer from a bout of cabin fever, according to engineer Chris Porter. Sessions later resumed at Sarm West Studio 2, where the latter stages of production would take place.

In addition to playing various instruments on the album, he wrote and produced every track on the recording except for one, "Look at Your Hands", which he co-wrote with Austin. A contemporary "black" pop-R&B album, Faith showcases Michael's vocals in a new style mode. Its songs are littered with introspective lyrics, which generated controversies about Michael's personal relationships at that time. The album comprises many musical styles including soul ("Father Figure", "One More Try"), rock ("Look at Your Hands", "Faith", "Hand to Mouth"), funk ("Monkey", "Hard Day") and jazz ("Kissing a Fool").

Some of the material was more graphic than Michael's previous efforts with Wham! One such song was "I Want Your Sex", which had three parts: the first part was titled "Rhythm 1: Lust", which was the version that would eventually be released as a single and featured electro funk influences; the second part was titled "Rhythm 2: Brass in Love", which mixed a more instrumentally-based funk live instrumentation with a smoother R&B arrangement during the verses; the third part, which was edited to be the final song on the album, was titled "Rhythm 3: A Last Request", featuring a jazz-influenced quiet storm and R&B sound combined with lyrics telling of Michael drunkenly trying to bring his lover to his bed.

Michael's liner notes in the booklet:

"These songs are the result of the last two years of my life. They are dedicated to my family and friends, whose loyalty and time are more important to me than ever before.

Love as always,

George"

The title track began with an organ fanfare that was actually the music to Wham!'s "Freedom" played as if in a cathedral. After this, the song featured a rockabilly sound similar to Bo Diddley while Michael added his own style with his vocals. "Father Figure" originally was a dance-styled production until Michael removed the snare drums from it and kept it that way because he loved what he heard, making the song a mid-tempo R&B ballad. "One More Try" was a soul song in the tradition of songs by Marvin Gaye and Stevie Wonder; its lyrics tell of a man who pushes his lover away out of fear of repeating past relationships, only to accept the invitation in the end.

"Hard Day", much like the first two parts of "I Want Your Sex", was inspired by funk. The social commentary song "Hand to Mouth" had a slight pop and folk approach while a similar social commentary song, "Look at Your Hands", co-written by Michael and David Austin, produced a pop song with rock elements featuring a piano and saxophone. "Monkey" returns to the funk influences of some of the other songs. A remix of the song by Jimmy Jam and Terry Lewis brings a new jack swing approach to the original. "Kissing a Fool" is a jazz-influenced ballad with lyrics solemnly describing a breakup.

The synthesisers used by Michael on the album include the Yamaha DX7, Roland S-50, Roland D-50 and Roland Juno-106 (used for most synthesised bass parts and strings). Drum machines were a LinnDrum (Michael's main drum machine on the album—not the Linn 9000), Roland TR-808 and a Yamaha RX-5, while drum parts were played on a Pearl drum kit ("Look at Your Hands") and Roland Octapad. Engineer Chris Porter's Greengate DS3 sampler was sometimes used in conjunction the Linn for certain drum sounds, although the Linn's sounds were what Michael preferred. Non-synthesised parts were played by Michael on a Fender Precision Bass.

== Release ==
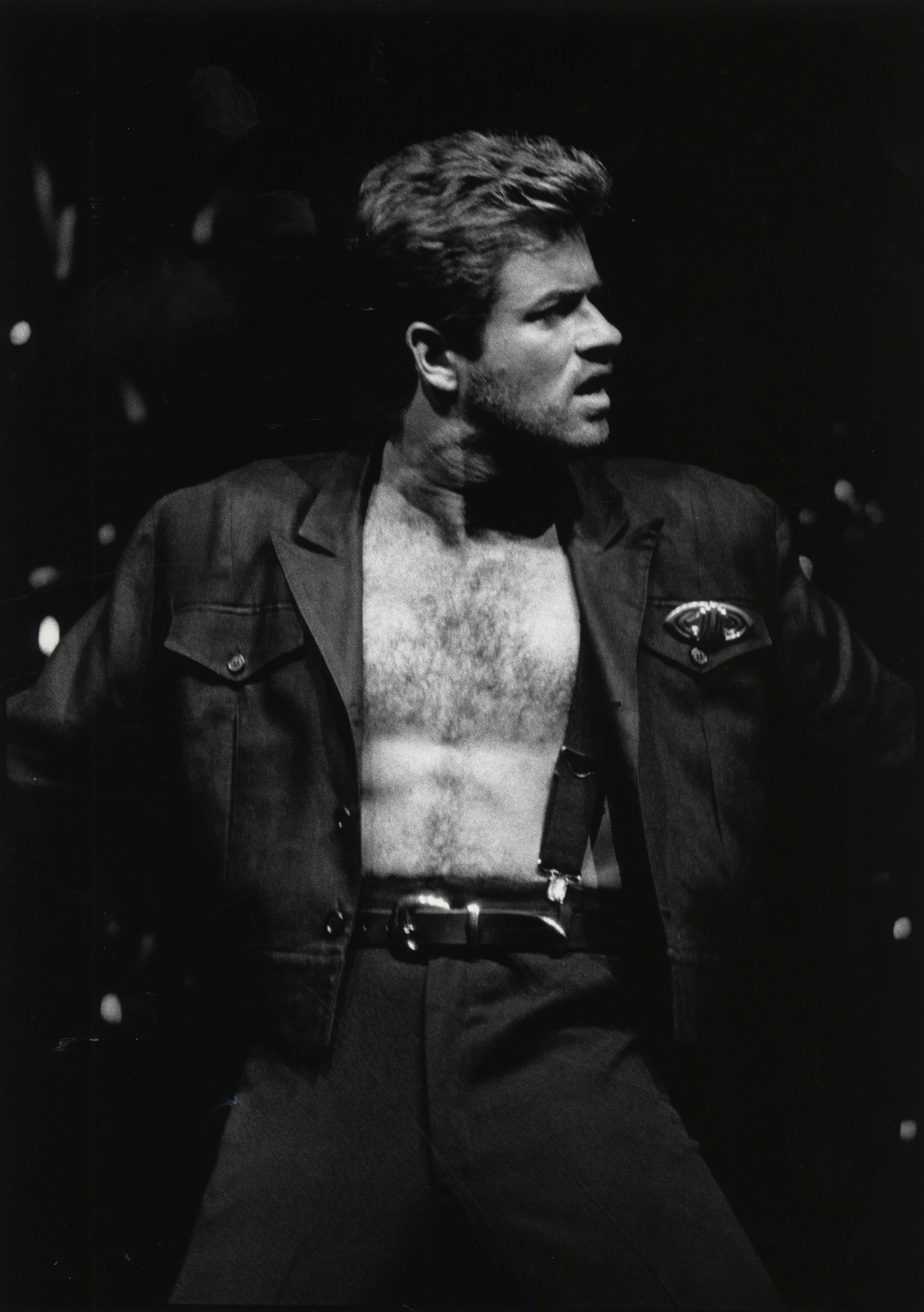
Michael during a Faith Tour concert in 1988. The album propelled him to solo stardom and one of the most successful English acts of the 1980s.

10 weeks after its release, Faith reached number one on the US Billboard 200. Its early, and successive, success on the chart was said to be partly sustained—with help from plenty of press appearances and promotions—by its strong single releases. After "I Want Your Sex" helped propel Faith to its debut atop the chart, the second single "Faith" aided the album's continuing sales dominance. It also reached number one on the UK Albums Chart, although it stayed at the top spot for only one week. Faith stayed for 51 non-consecutive weeks inside the Billboard 200 top 10, including 12 weeks at number one. It was also the first album by a white solo artist to hit number one on the Billboard Top Black Albums chart.

In a 1988 interview with Jet magazine, Michael was quoted as saying: "I was much happier with [Faith] being the No. 1 Black [chart] album than I was when it became the No. 1 Pop album. There was much more of a sense of achievement. I knew this album would be a shock or a surprise to people in this country. The uptempo side of the new music is more overtly sexual, more black."

During 1987 and 1988, Faith produced a string of hit singles for Michael, including six top-five Billboard Hot 100 hits, four of which ("Faith", "Father Figure", "One More Try", and "Monkey") reached number one, making him the only British male solo artist to have four number one hits from one album on the Billboard Hot 100. "Faith" was 1988's best-selling single in the United States; with "Careless Whisper" having been the best-selling single in 1985, Michael became the first musician to achieve two Billboard Year-End number one singles chart since the Beatles' "Hey Jude" topped the Year-End singles chart in 1968 after "I Want to Hold Your Hand" had done so in 1964. Michael also had both the year's number one album and the number one single, which hadn't happened since 1970, when Simon & Garfunkel grabbed both positions with Bridge over Troubled Water and its title track.

== Promotion ==
=== Tour and video media ===
Michael embarked on a world tour titled The Faith Tour to promote the album in February 1988, opening at Tokyo's Budokan arena, before going on to dates in Australia, Europe and North America. In Auburn Hills, Michigan, Michael was joined on stage by Aretha Franklin for a duet on "I Knew You Were Waiting (For Me)". While on tour, new singles from the album continued to be released. In June, Michael interrupted the tour to sing three songs at Wembley Stadium's Nelson Mandela 70th Birthday Tribute.

A video compilation of the same name was released by CMV Enterprises on 9 August 1988, to promote the album. The singer's first solo video compilation, it contained six music videos from the album—"I Want Your Sex", "Faith", "Father Figure", "One More Try", "Monkey", and "Kissing a Fool". These videos were later released on the 1999 video compilation Ladies & Gentlemen: The Best of George Michael.

== Critical reception ==
Professional ratings
Review scores
Source	Rating
AllMusic	5/5 stars
The Boston Phoenix	4/4 stars
Los Angeles Times	3/4 stars
New Musical Express	8/10
Pitchfork	8.7/10
Record Collector	4/5 stars
Rolling Stone	4/5 stars
The Rolling Stone Album Guide	4/5 stars
The Village Voice	B+

Faith was met with widespread acclaim from music critics. Mark Coleman of Rolling Stone praised Michael for emerging as "one of pop music’s leading artisans, a painstaking craftsman who combines a graceful knack for vocal hooks with an uncanny ability to ransack the past for musical ideas and still sound fresh" and dubbed Michael the "Elton John of the 1980s". Coleman also claimed that Faith is "a concept album of sorts" incorporating "disco groove [varying] from urban thump to slow tropical heat wave", praising it for being "grounded in a passion and personal commitment".

Faith earned Michael numerous accolades, including Album of the Year at the 31st Grammy Awards. Michael was awarded three awards at the 1989 American Music Awards: Favorite Pop/Rock Male Artist, Favorite Soul/R&B Male Artist and Favorite Soul/R&B Album for Faith. He was also honoured with the MTV Video Vanguard Award. Faith was the best-selling album of 1988 in the United States, and eventually reached Diamond certification by the Recording Industry Association of America. According to Nielsen SoundScan, current sales of the album stand at 11 million copies, making it the 52nd bestselling album in the United States. Faith has sold around over 20 million copies worldwide.

=== Reappraisal ===
In a Billboard review, Faith was considered to have "cemented [Michael] as an MTV icon and a global superstar" and shaping the sound of "late-'80s pop as much as any LP of its time." Writing for BBC Music, Ian Wade praised Faith for being a "classic of its era" and "one of the more listenable major releases of the 80s." He also regarded the album being responsible for turning Michael into a "proper international superstar, confirming his rightful place at pop's top table."

Reviewing the reissue of Faith for the Metro in 2011, Arwa Haider claimed: "Faith still bursts with self-belief, designer vanity, classic songs and imagery, right from the opening title track which begins with a funeral church organ rendition of Wham!'s hit, "Freedom", before clicking into jaunty rock 'n' roll. It's easy to hear why Faith achieved multi-million status, although the masterful ballads ("Father Figure", "One More Try") have stood the test of time better than Michael's funk-pop." Following the 30th anniversary of the release of the single "Faith", Nate Hertweck wrote in a Grammy Awards review that the song "change[d] everything".

In 1989, Faith was ranked at number 84 on Rolling Stone's list of the Greatest Albums of the 80s. In 2003, the album was ranked at number 480 on Rolling Stone's list of the 500 Greatest Albums of All Time, while in 2012, the album ranked eight places higher at number 472 on an updated list by the magazine. In a 2020 revised list, it moved up to 151. Faith was ranked 79th in a 2005 survey held by British television's Channel 4 to determine the 100 Greatest Albums of All Time. In 2006, Q magazine placed the album at number 24 in its list of 40 Best Albums of the '80s. Slant Magazine listed the album at number 62 on its list of Best Albums of the 1980s.

=== 2011 remastered release ===
Professional ratings
Aggregate scores
Source	Rating
Metacritic	90/100
Review scores
Source	Rating
BBC Music	10/10
Entertainment Weekly	A
Filter	85%
Islington Gazette	4/4 stars
Q	4/5 stars
Rolling Stone	4/5 stars
Slant Magazine	3.5/5 stars

The 2011 re-release received universal acclaim from music critics according to Metacritic. A remastered edition of Faith was released on 31 January 2011 in the UK and on 1 February 2011 in the US. It is available in several formats: Limited Edition Collectors Box Set, Two-CD and DVD Special Edition, Two-CD Edition and iTunes LP. The box set release features: the remastered album on CD, an additional CD of remastered 12" versions and B-sides; a DVD featuring a TV special from 1987, a hardbound book that includes an exclusive interview with George Michael, sleeve notes, rare photos and memorabilia; a vinyl album replica of the original LP; and a memorabilia envelope that includes five art prints, reproduction poster, tickets and tour pass from the Faith tour sourced from Michael's personal archive. All this is housed in a 12 x 12 numbered, black and gold-foiled slipcase with original artwork overlay. The first 2,000 copies were also provided with a hand-numbered lithograph attached (taped) outside the box set.

== Accolades ==
=== Billboard Year-End Number One Awards ===
Year	Nominee / work	Award	Result
1988	Faith	Top Pop Albums	Won

=== Grammy Awards ===
Year	Nominee / work	Award	Result
1989	Faith (performed and produced by George Michael)	Album of the Year	Won
1989	"Father Figure" (performed by George Michael)	Best Pop Vocal Performance – Male	Nominated

=== American Music Awards ===
Year	Nominee / work	Award	Result
1989	Faith	Favorite Soul/R&B Album	Won
1989	Faith	Favorite Pop/Rock Album	Nominated
1989	George Michael	Favorite Soul/R&B Male Artist	Won
1989	George Michael	Favorite Pop/Rock Male Artist	Won

=== MTV Video Music Awards ===
Year	Nominee / work	Award	Result
1988	"Father Figure" (Directors: Andy Morahan and George Michael)	Best Direction in a Video	Won
1988	"Father Figure" (Director of Photography: Peter Mackay)	Best Cinematography in a Video	Nominated
1988	"Faith" (Art Director: Bryan Jones)	Best Art Direction in a Video	Nominated
1989	George Michael	Video Vanguard Award	Won

=== Brit Awards ===
Year	Nominee / work	Award	Result
1988	Faith	Best British Album	Nominated
1988	George Michael	Best British Male Artist	Won

=== Ivor Novello Awards ===
Year	Nominee / work	Award	Result
1989	Faith	International Hit of the Year	Won

=== Japan Gold Disc Awards ===
Year	Nominee / work	Award	Result
1988	Faith	The Best International Pop Solo Album of the Year	Won

== Track listing ==
All tracks are written and produced by George Michael; "Look at Your Hands" co-written with David Austin.

Standard edition

Side one
No.	Title	Length
1.	"Faith"	3:16
2.	"Father Figure"	5:36
3.	"I Want Your Sex" (Parts 1 & 2)	9:17
4.	"One More Try"	5:50

Side two
No.	Title	Length
5.	"Hard Day"	4:48
6.	"Hand to Mouth"	4:36
7.	"Look at Your Hands"	4:37
8.	"Monkey"	5:06
9.	"Kissing a Fool"	4:35

CD and cassette bonus tracks
No.	Title	Length
10.	"Hard Day" (Shep Pettibone remix)	6:29
11.	"A Last Request (I Want Your Sex Part 3)"	3:48

Note:

- In the liner notes, "I Want Your Sex" is listed as "I Want Your Sex (Monogamy Mix)", with the parts titled "Rhythm One: Lust" and "Rhythm Two: Brass in Love", respectively. However, on the album, the start of "Rhythm One" is slightly different from how the corresponding section starts on the actual "Monogamy Mix" as featured on the previous single release: on the album, the song starts with a synthesized bass and electronic effects, while the drums and programmed percussion come in some seconds later; on the single, the song starts only with drums and percussion.

VHS video compilation

1. "I Want Your Sex" (uncensored version) – music video
2. "Faith" – music video
3. "Father Figure" – music video
4. "One More Try" – music video
5. "Monkey" – music video
6. "Kissing a Fool" – music video

=== 2011 remaster ===
Disc one

The first disc features the remastered version of the original album.

10. "A Last Request (I Want Your Sex Part 3)" – 3:48

Disc two

1. "Faith" (instrumental) – 3:16
2. "Fantasy" – 5:02
3. "Hard Day" (Shep Pettibone mix) – 9:04
4. "I Believe (When I Fall in Love It Will Be Forever)" (Stevie Wonder, Yvonne Wright) (live) – 7:03
5. "Kissing a Fool" (instrumental) – 4:35
6. "Love's in Need of Love Today" (live at Wembley Arena, 1 April 1987) (Wonder) – 4:43
7. "Monkey" (7" edit version) – 4:48
8. "Monkey" (a capella & beats) – 7:27
9. "Monkey" (Jam & Lewis remix) – 8:10

Note:

- "I Believe (When I Fall in Love It Will Be Forever)" is a live track although it is not mentioned anywhere on the CD.

2011 remaster DVD

1. George Michael and Jonathan Ross Have Words (1987)
2. Music Money Love Faith (February 1988)
3. "I Want Your Sex" – music video (re-synced with re-mastered audio)
4. "I Want Your Sex" (uncensored version) – music video
5. "Faith" – music video
6. "Father Figure" – music video
7. "One More Try" – music video
8. "Monkey" – music video
9. "Kissing a Fool" – music video

== Personnel ==
Personnel taken from Faith liner notes, and Sound on Sound.

- George Michael – vocals, LinnDrum programming, keyboards ("Father Figure", "I Want Your Sex" (Part 2), "Hand to Mouth"), all instruments ( "I Want Your Sex" (Part 1), "Hard Day", "Monkey"), bass ("Hand to Mouth", "Kissing a Fool"), guitar ("I Want Your Sex" (Part 2)), drums ("Look at Your Hands"), handclaps and finger-snaps ("Faith"), arranger, producer
- Hugh Burns – guitar ("Faith", "Father Figure", "Hand to Mouth", "Kissing a Fool")
- Roddy Matthews – guitar ("Monkey")
- Lee Fothergill – guitar ("Kissing a Fool")
- Robert Ahwai – guitar ("Monkey")
- J.J. Belle – guitar ("Look at Your Hands")
- Chris Cameron – keyboards ("I Want Your Sex" (Part 2), "One More Try"), cathedral organ (Note: The keyboard used was actually a Yamaha DX7 with a cathedral organ preset.) ("Faith"), piano ("Kissing a Fool")
- Shirley Lewis – backing vocals ("Father Figure")
- Betsy Cook – additional keyboards ("Father Figure")
- Danny Schogger – keyboards ("Look at Your Hands"), additional keyboards ("I Want Your Sex" (Part 2))
- Deon Estus – bass guitar ("Faith", "I Want Your Sex" (Part 2), "One More Try", "Look at Your Hands")
- Ian Thomas – drums ("Kissing a Fool")
- Andy Duncan – percussion ("Hand to Mouth")
- Steve Sidwell, Paul Spong, Rick Taylor – horns ("I Want Your Sex" (Part 2), "Kissing a Fool")
- John Altman, Mark Chandler, Malcolm Griffiths, Jamie Talbot, Steve Waterman – horns ("Kissing a Fool")

Technical

- Chris Porter – engineer
- Paul Gomersall – assistant engineer
- Paul Wright – assistant engineer
- Shep Pettibone – remix, additional production
- Steve Peck – remix engineer

== Charts ==
=== Weekly charts ===
Chart (1987–2011)	Peak position
Australian Albums (Kent Music Report)	3
Austrian Albums (Ö3 Austria)	3
Belgian Albums (Ultratop Flanders)	33
Belgian Albums (Ultratop Wallonia)	24
Canada Top Albums/CDs (RPM)	1
Canadian Albums (The Record)	1
Dutch Albums (Album Top 100)	1
European Albums (Top 100)	1
Finnish Albums (Suomen virallinen lista)	4
French Albums (SNEP)	5
German Albums (Offizielle Top 100)	3
Japanese Albums (Oricon)	11
New Zealand Albums (RMNZ)	3
Norwegian Albums (VG-lista)	3
Spanish Albums (PROMUSICAE)	1
Swedish Albums (Sverigetopplistan)	4
Swiss Albums (Schweizer Hitparade)	4
UK Albums (Official Charts)	1
US Billboard 200	1
US Top R&B/Hip-Hop Albums (Billboard)	1
Zimbabwean Albums (ZIMA)	1

Chart (2026)	Peak position
Belgian Albums (Ultratop Flanders)	10
Belgian Albums (Ultratop Wallonia)	9
German Pop Albums (Offizielle Top 100)	2
Hungarian Albums (MAHASZ)	38
Italian Albums (FIMI)	74
Polish Albums (ZPAV)	28
Spanish Albums (Promusicae)	99

=== Year-end charts ===
Chart (1987)	Position
Australian Albums (Kent Music Report)	73
Canada Top Albums/CDs (RPM)	65
Dutch Albums (MegaCharts)	25
French Albums (SNEP)	7
German Albums (Offizielle Top 100)	14
Norwegian Christmas Period Albums (VG-lista)	4
UK Albums (OCC)	25

Chart (1988)	Position
Australian Albums (ARIA)	11
Austrian Albums (Ö3 Austria)	8
Canada Top Albums/CDs (RPM)	2
Dutch Albums (MegaCharts)	14
Spanish Albums (PROMUSICAE)	2
New Zealand (RMNZ)	12
Norwegian Winter Period Albums (VG-lista)	14
Swiss Albums Chart	12
UK Albums (OCC)	37
US Billboard 200	1
US Top R&B/Hip-Hop Albums (Billboard)	3

Chart (1989)	Position
Canada Top Albums/CDs (RPM)	78
US Billboard 200	43

=== Decade-end charts ===
Chart (1990–1999)	Position
Austrian Albums (Ö3 Austria)	43

=== All-time charts ===
Chart	Position
US Billboard 200	81

== Certifications and sales ==
Region	Certification	Certified units/sales
Argentina (CAPIF)	Platinum	60,000^{^}
Australia (ARIA)	5× Platinum	350,000^{^}
Brazil as of January 1991	—	280,000
Canada (Music Canada)	Diamond	1,000,000^{^}
Canada (Music Canada) video	Platinum	10,000^{^}
Denmark (IFPI Danmark)	Platinum	20,000^{‡}
France (SNEP)	2× Platinum	600,000^{*}
Germany (BVMI)	Gold	250,000^{^}
Hong Kong (IFPI Hong Kong)	Gold	10,000^{*}
Italy	—	200,000
Japan	—	204,000
Netherlands (NVPI)	Platinum	100,000^{^}
New Zealand (RMNZ)	Platinum	15,000^{^}
Norway (IFPI Norway)	Gold	50,000
Spain (Promusicae)	2× Platinum	200,000^{^}
Sweden (GLF)	Gold	50,000^{^}
Switzerland (IFPI Switzerland)	2× Platinum	100,000^{^}
United Kingdom (BPI)	4× Platinum	1,300,000
United States (RIAA)	Diamond	10,000,000^{^}
United States (RIAA) video	Platinum	100,000^{^}
Summaries
Worldwide	—	25,000,000
^{*} Sales figures based on certification alone.^{^} Shipments figures based on certification alone.^{‡} Sales+streaming figures based on certification alone.

== See also ==
- List of best-selling albums
- List of best-selling albums in the United States
- List of Billboard Hot 100 number-one singles of 1988
- List of Billboard number-one R&B albums of 1988
