= List of George Michael live performances =

George Michael live performances
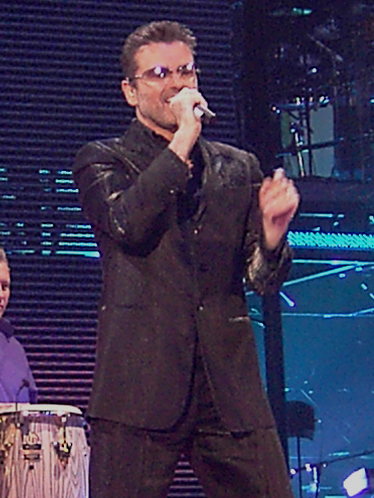
- Michael performing during the 25 Live tour in 2006
- Concert tours: 5
- Benefit concerts: 16
- Other performances: 7

The following is a list of concert tours and notable live acts undertaken by English singer-songwriter George Michael (1963–2016).

== Concert tours ==
Title	Date	Associated album(s)	Continent(s)	Shows	Attendance	Ref.
The Faith Tour	19 February 1988 – 6 July 1989	Faith	Asia; Oceania; North America; Europe	109		
Cover to Cover tour	15 January – 31 October 1991	—N/a	Europe; South America; Asia; North America	29		
25 Live	23 September 2006 – 1 December 2008	Twenty Five	Europe; North America; Middle East	106	1,300,000	
George Michael Live in Australia	20 February – 3 March 2010	Twenty Five	Australia	3	100,000	
Symphonica Tour	22 August 2011 – 17 October 2012	—N/a	Europe	67		

== Benefit concerts ==
Title	Date	Location	Song(s) performed	Ref.
Live Aid	13 July 1985	Wembley Stadium, London	"Don't Let the Sun Go Down on Me" (with Elton John)	
The Prince's Trust 10th Anniversary	20 June 1986	Wembley Arena, London	"Everytime You Go Away" (with Paul Young)	
Stand by Me: AIDS Day Benefit	1 April 1987	Wembley Arena, London	"1-2-3" (with Deon Estus); "Love's in Need of Love Today"; "Everything She Wants" (featuring Andrew Ridgeley)	
Nelson Mandela 70th Birthday Tribute	11 June 1988	Wembley Stadium, London	"Village Ghetto Land"; "If You Were My Woman"; "Sexual Healing"	
The Freddie Mercury Tribute Concert	20 April 1992	Wembley Stadium, London	"'39"; "These Are the Days of Our Lives" (with Lisa Stansfield); "Somebody to Love"	
The Concert Benefiting the Elizabeth Taylor AIDS Foundation	11 October 1992	Madison Square Garden, New York City	"Candle in the Wind"; "Ticking"; "Don't Let the Sun Go Down on Me"	
Rock for the Rainforest	2 March 1993	Carnegie Hall, New York City	"Waiting for That Day" (with Sting); "Freedom"; "We Can Work It Out"; "Every Breath You Take" (with Sting)	
Concert of Hope	1 December 1993	Wembley Arena, London	"Father Figure"; "Killer / Papa Was a Rollin' Stone"; "One More Try"; "Freedom"; "Freedom! '90"; "Love's in Need of Love Today"; "Everything She Wants"	
The AIDS Benefit in England	1 December 1994	Royal Albert Hall, London	"Someone Saved My Life Tonight" (with Elton John); "Don't Let the Sun Go Down on Me" (with Elton John)	
Commitment to Life VIII	19 January 1995	Universal Amphitheatre, Los Angeles	"Don't Let the Sun Go Down on Me" (with Elton John); "Baby Can I Hold You"	
Concert for Linda	10 April 1999	Royal Albert Hall, London	"The Long and Winding Road"; "Faith"	
NetAid	9 October 1999	Wembley Stadium, London	"Brother, Can You Spare a Dime?"; "Fastlove"; "Freedom! '90"; "Father Figure"	
Stonewall Concert	28 November 1999	Royal Albert Hall, London	"My Baby Just Cares for Me"; "I Remember You"	
Equality Rocks	29 April 2000	Robert F. Kennedy Memorial Stadium, Washington, D.C.	"Freedom! '90" (with Garth Brooks); "Father Figure"; "Fastlove"; "I Remember You"	
Pavarotti & Friends for Cambodia and Tibet	6 June 2000	Parco Novi Sad, Modena	"Brother, Can You Spare a Dime?"; "Don't Let the Sun Go Down on Me" (with Luciano Pavarotti)	
Live 8	2 July 2005	Hyde Park, London	"Drive My Car" (with Paul McCartney)	

== Other performances ==
Title	Date	Song(s) performed	Ref.
MTV 10	27 November 1991 (broadcast)	"Freedom! '90"	
MTV European Music Awards	24 November 1994	"Freedom! '90"; "Jesus to a Child"	
An Audience with George Michael	8 October 1996	"Everything She Wants"; "You Have Been Loved"; "Fastlove"; "Praying for Time"; "I Can't Make You Love Me"; "Freedom! '90"; "Father Figure"; "The Strangest Thing"; "Star People"	
MTV Unplugged	11 October 1996	"Everything She Wants"; "You Have Been Loved"; "Fastlove"; "Praying for Time"; "I Can't Make You Love Me"; "Freedom! '90"; "Father Figure"; "The Strangest Thing"; "Star People"	
MTV European Music Awards	14 November 1996	"Star People"	
VH-1 Honors	10 April 1997	"Living for the City" (with Stevie Wonder)	
2012 Summer Olympics closing ceremony	12 August 2012	"Freedom! '90"; "White Light"	

== See also ==
- List of best-selling music artists
