= List of awards and nominations received by George Michael =

Recognitions of the English musician

George Michael awards and nominations
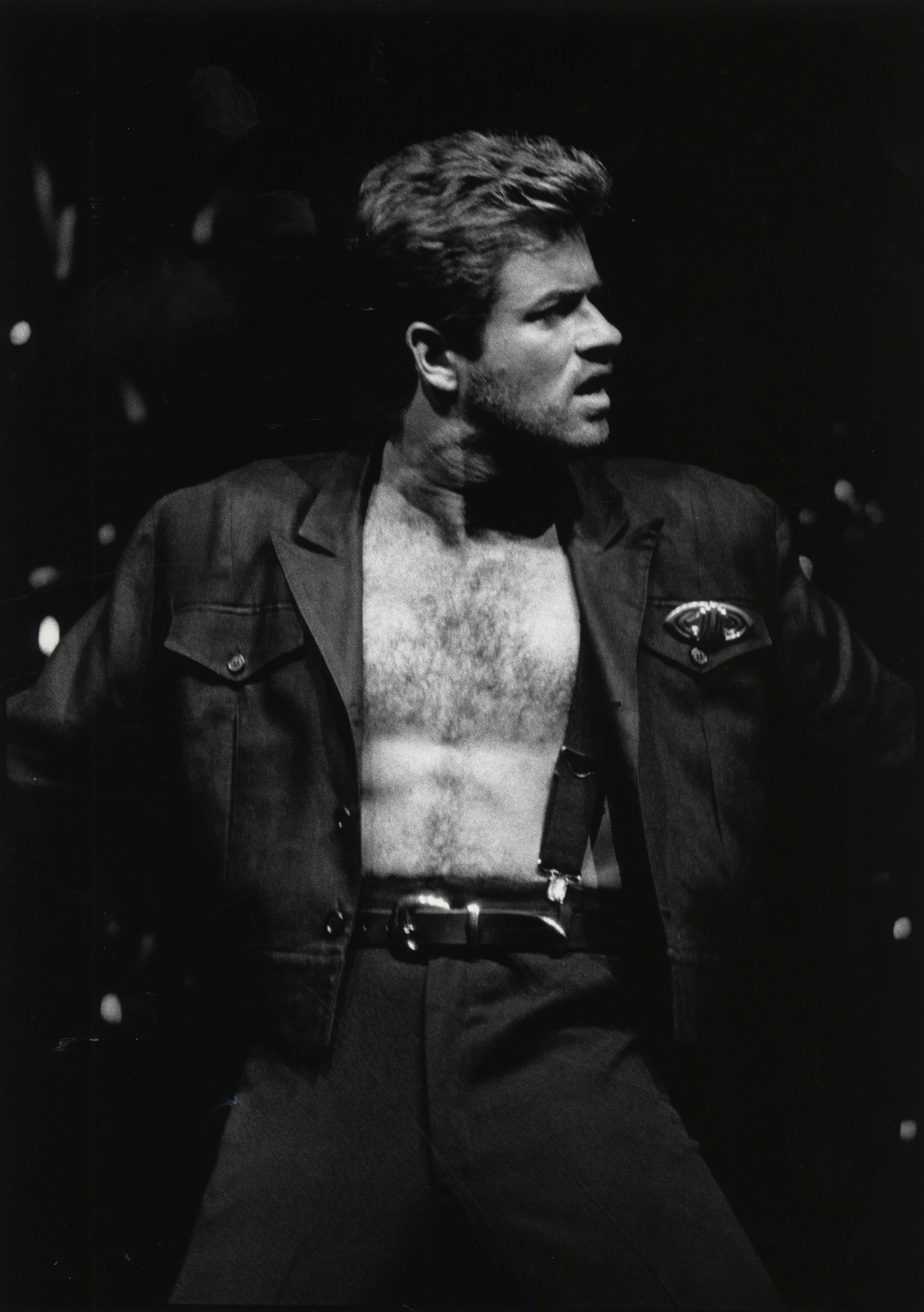
- Michael performing in 1988
Awards and nominations
Award	Wins	Nominations
American Music Awards	4	7
Billboard	12	40
Brit	5	24
Grammy	2	8
MTV Europe	1	6
MTV VMA	4	16
Ivor Novello Awards	6	11

George Michael (1963–2016) was an English singer, songwriter, and record producer. He sold an estimated 125 million records worldwide, making him one of the world's best-selling music artists of all time, and had eleven albums reach the Billboard 200. During his career as a solo musician, Michael released five studio albums: Faith (1987), Listen Without Prejudice Vol. 1 (1990), Older (1996), Songs from the Last Century (1999), and Patience (2004).

Michael received recognition in the United Kingdom, winning 5 awards from 24 nominations at the BRIT Awards; two of those awards were for "Best British Male" in 1988 and again in 1997. He also found success at the MTV Video Music Awards, receiving 4 awards from 16 nominations, including "Best Direction in a Video" for the song "Father Figure" in 1988. Michael's debut album Faith won multiple awards, including "Favorite Album (Soul/R&B)" from the American Music Awards and "Album of the Year" from the Grammy Awards.

On 20 October 2016, it was announced that Michael was nominated for induction into the Songwriters Hall of Fame in 2017. In 2023 Michael was posthumously inducted into the Rock and Roll Hall of Fame. He is also an inductee of the UK Music Hall of Fame.

== ASCAP Pop Music Awards ==
The American Society of Composers, Authors and Publishers (ASCAP) is a not-for-profit performance rights organization that protects its members' musical copyrights by monitoring public performances of their music, whether via a broadcast or live performance, and compensating them accordingly.

Year	Nominee / work	Award	Result	Ref.
1986	"Wake Me Up Before You Go-Go"	Most Performed Songs	Won	
1986	"Careless Whisper"	Most Performed Songs	Won	
1986	"Everything She Wants"	Most Performed Songs	Won	
1987	"I'm Your Man"	Most Performed Songs	Won	
1989	"Faith"	Most Performed Songs	Won	
1989	"One More Try"	Most Performed Songs	Won	
1989	"Father Figure"	Most Performed Songs	Won	
1990	"Kissing a Fool"	Most Performed Songs	Won	
1990	"Heaven Help Me"	Most Performed Songs	Won	
1992	"Praying for Time"	Most Performed Songs	Won	
1997	"Jesus to a Child"	Most Performed Songs	Won	

== American Music Awards ==
The American Music Awards is an annual awards ceremony created by Dick Clark in 1973. Michael received four awards from seven nominations.

Year	Nominee / work	Award	Result
1986	Wham!	Favorite Pop/Rock Band/Duo/Group Video Artist	Won
1986	"Careless Whisper"	Favorite Pop/Rock Single	Nominated
1988	George Michael	Favorite Pop/Rock Male Artist	Nominated
1989	George Michael	Favorite Pop/Rock Male Artist	Won
1989	George Michael	Favorite Soul/R&B Male Artist	Won
1989	Faith	Favorite Pop/Rock Album	Nominated
1989	Faith	Favorite Soul/R&B Album	Won

== Billboard Number-One Awards ==
Prior to the inauguration of the Billboard Music Awards in 1990, the magazine had the "Number One Awards" to honor the top-performing artists in each of the year-end chart categories. The first Billboard Number One Awards presentation was hosted by Gary Owens in August 1972 at Franco's La Taverna Restaurant, Los Angeles, where trophies were presented to artists who topped the 1971 year-end charts. George Michael won 12 Billboard Number-One awards.

Year	Nominee / work	Award	Result
1985	Himself	Top Producer	Nominated
1986	Himself	Top Producer	Nominated
1986	Himself	Top Hot 100 Artist	Nominated
1986	"A Different Corner"	Top Hot 100 Song	Nominated
1986	"A Different Corner"	Top Adult Contemporary Single	Nominated
1987	Himself	Top Hot 100 Artist	Nominated
1987	Himself	Top Hot 100 Artist - Male	Won
1987	Himself	Top Dance Club Play Artist	Nominated
1987	Himself	Top Dance Sales Artist	Nominated
1987	Himself	Top Producer	Nominated
1987	"I Knew You Were Waiting (For Me)"	Top Hot 100 Song	Nominated
1987	"I Want Your Sex"	Top Hot 100 Song	Nominated
1987	"I Want Your Sex"	Top Dance Club Play Single	Nominated
1987	"I Want Your Sex"	Top Dance Sales Single	Nominated
1987	"I Want Your Sex"	Top Hot Crossover Single	Nominated
1988	Himself	Top Artist	Won
1988	Himself	Top Male Artist	Won
1988	Himself	Top Billboard 200 Artist	Won
1988	Himself	Top Billboard 200 Artist - Male	Won
1988	Himself	Top Hot 100 Artist	Won
1988	Himself	Top Hot 100 Artist - Male	Won
1988	Himself	Top Crossover Artist	Won
1988	Himself	Top R&B Artist	Nominated
1988	Himself	Top R&B Artist - Male	Nominated
1988	Himself	Top R&B Album Artist	Nominated
1988	Himself	Top R&B Album Artist - Male	Nominated
1988	Himself	Top R&B Singles Artist	Nominated
1988	Himself	Top R&B Singles Artist - Male	Nominated
1988	Himself	Top Adult Contemporary Artist	Nominated
1988	Himself	Top Adult Contemporary Artist - Male	Nominated
1988	Himself	Top Dance Club Play Artist	Nominated
1988	Himself	Top Dance Club Play Artist - Male	Nominated
1988	Himself	Top Dance Sales Artist	Nominated
1988	"Faith"	Top Hot 100 Song	Won
1988	Faith	Top Billboard 200 Album	Won
1988	Faith	Top Compact Disk	Won
1988	Faith	Top R&B Album	Nominated
1989	Faith	Top Billboard 200 Album	Won
2004	Himself	Top Hot Dance Singles Sales Artist	Nominated
2004	"Amazing"	Top Hot Dance Sales Single of the Year	Nominated

== Brit Awards ==
The Brit Awards are the British Phonographic Industry's annual pop music awards. Michael received five awards from twenty four nominations.

Year	Nominee / work	Award	Result
1984	Wham!	British Breakthrough Act	Nominated
1985	Wham!	British Group	Won
1985	"Careless Whisper"	British Single of the Year	Nominated
1985	"Last Christmas"	British Video of the Year	Nominated
1985	"Wake Me Up Before You Go-Go"	British Video of the Year	Nominated
1986	Wham!	Outstanding Contribution to Music	Won
1988	George Michael	British Male Solo Artist	Won
1988	Faith	British Album of the Year	Nominated
1989	George Michael	British Male Solo Artist	Nominated
1991	George Michael	British Male Solo Artist	Nominated
1991	George Michael	British Producer of the Year	Nominated
1991	Listen Without Prejudice Vol. 1	British Album of the Year	Won
1991	"Freedom! '90"	British Video of the Year	Nominated
1992	George Michael	British Male Solo Artist	Nominated
1993	George Michael	British Male Solo Artist	Nominated
1993	"Too Funky"	British Video of the Year	Nominated
1997	George Michael	British Male Solo Artist	Won
1997	Older	British Album of the Year	Nominated
1997	"Fastlove"	British Single of the Year	Nominated
1997	"Fastlove"	British Video of the Year	Nominated
1999	"Outside"	British Single of the Year	Nominated
1999	"Outside"	British Video of the Year	Nominated
2005	"Amazing"	British Single of the Year	Nominated
2007	George Michael	British Live Act	Nominated

== Camerimage ==
Camerimage is a Polish film festival dedicated to the celebration of cinematography.

Year	Nominee / work	Award	Result
2014	"Let Her Down Easy"	Best Music Video	Nominated

== D&AD Awards ==
Design and Art Direction (D&AD) is a British educational charity which exists to promote excellence in design and advertising.

Year	Nominee / work	Award	Result
1999	"Outside"	Pop Promo Video with a budget over £40.000	Wood Pencil

== Danish Music Awards ==
The Danish Music Awards (DMA) is a Danish award show. The show has been arranged by IFPI since 1989, and was originally called IFPI-prisen ("IFPI-Award") until 1991, when it changed its name to Dansk Grammy ("Danish Grammy"). The current name was given in 2001, after the American Grammy Awards registered the name Grammy as their trademark. In 2011 IFPI joined with TV2 (Denmark) and KODA to present the awards ceremony.

Michael received three awards in 1997.

Year	Nominee / work	Award	Result
1997	George Michael	Foreign Male Singer	Won
1997	Older	International Album	Won
1997	"Fastlove, Pt. 1"	International Hit	Won

== ECHO Awards ==
The ECHO Award is a German music award granted every year by the Deutsche Phono-Akademie, an association of recording companies. Michael has two nominations.

Year	Nominee / work	Award	Result
2000	Himself	Best International Male	Nominated
2005	Himself	Best International Male	Nominated

== GAFFA Awards ==
Delivered since 1991. The GAFFA Awards (Danish: GAFFA Prisen) are a Danish award that rewards popular music, awarded by the GAFFA magazine.

Year	Nominee / work	Award	Result
1998	George Michael	Årets Udenlandske Sanger	Won

== GLAAD Media Awards ==
The GLAAD Media Awards were formed in 1990 by the Gay & Lesbian Alliance Against Defamation. Michael received one nomination.

Year	Nominee / work	Award	Result
2005	Patience	Outstanding Music Artist	Nominated

== Golden Raspberry Awards ==
The Golden Raspberry Awards are parody awards honoring the worst of cinematic under-achievements. Michael won one award.

Year	Nominee / work	Award	Result
1988	"I Want Your Sex"	Worst Original Song	Won

== Grammy Awards ==
The Grammy Awards are awarded annually by the National Academy of Recording Arts and Sciences of the United States. Michael received two awards from eight nominations.

Year	Nominee / work	Award	Result
1988	"I Knew You Were Waiting (For Me)"	Best R&B Performance by a Duo or Group with Vocals	Won
1989	Faith	Album of the Year	Won
1989	"Father Figure"	Best Male Pop Vocal Performance	Nominated
1992	"Freedom! '90"	Best Male Pop Vocal Performance	Nominated
1993	"Don't Let the Sun Go Down on Me"	Best Pop Performance by a Duo or Group with Vocals	Nominated
2001	Songs from the Last Century	Best Traditional Pop Vocal Album	Nominated
2005	"Amazing"	Best Remixed Recording, Non-Classical	Nominated
2005	"Flawless (Go to the City)"	Best Music Video	Nominated

== Helpmann Awards ==
The Helpmann Awards recognise distinguished artistic achievement and excellence in Australia's live performing arts sectors.

Year	Nominee / work	Award	Result
2010	George Michael Live in Australia	Best International Contemporary Music Concert	Nominated

== Hungarian Music Awards ==
Hungarian Music Awards is the national music awards of Hungary, held every year since 1992 and promoted by Mahasz.

Year	Nominee / work	Award	Result
1994	Five Live	Best Concert Album	Won
1997	Older	Best Foreign Album	Won
1999	Ladies & Gentlemen: The Best of George Michael	Best Foreign Album	Nominated
2000	Songs from the Last Century	Best Foreign Album	Nominated

== International Dance Music Awards ==
The International Dance Music Award was established in 1985. It is a part of the Winter Music Conference, a weeklong electronic music event held annually.

Year	Nominee / work	Award	Result
2005	"Flawless (Go to the City)"	Best Dance Video	Nominated

== International Rock Awards ==
The International Rock Awards (1989–91) was a music award ceremony broadcast on ABC Television, to honor the top musicians in the genre of rock music.

Year	Nominee / work	Award	Result
1989	Himself	Artist of the Year	Nominated

== Ivor Novello Awards ==
The Ivor Novello Awards are presented annually in London by the British Academy of Composers and Songwriters. Michael received six awards.

Year	Nominee / work	Award	Result
1985	George Michael	Songwriter of the Year	Won
1985	"Careless Whisper"	Most Performed Work	Won
1985	"Careless Whisper"	Best Song Musically and Lyrically	Nominated
1985	"Wake Me Up Before You Go-Go"	International Hit of the Year	Nominated
1987	"The Edge of Heaven"	International Hit of the Year	Nominated
1989	"Faith"	International Hit of the Year	Won
1989	"Father Figure"	Best Contemporary Song	Nominated
1989	George Michael	Songwriter of the Year	Won
1997	George Michael	Songwriter of the Year	Won
1997	"Fastlove "	Most Performed Work	Won
2005	"Amazing"	PRS Most Performed Work	Nominated

== Juno Awards ==
The Juno Awards is a Canadian awards ceremony presented annually by the Canadian Academy of Recording Arts and Sciences. Michael received six nominations.

Year	Nominee / work	Award	Result
1985	Make It Big	International Album of the Year	Nominated
1985	"Careless Whisper"	International Single of the Year	Nominated
1985	"Wake Me Up Before You Go-Go"	International Single of the Year	Nominated
1989	"Faith"	International Single of the Year	Nominated
1989	Faith	International Album of the Year	Nominated
1989	George Michael	International Entertainer of the Year	Nominated

== MTV Europe Music Awards ==
The MTV Europe Music Awards is an annual awards ceremony established in 1994 by MTV Europe. Michael received one award from six nominations.

Year	Nominee / work	Award	Result
1996	"Fastlove"	MTV Amour	Nominated
1996	George Michael	Best Male	Won
1997	George Michael	Best Male	Nominated
1999	George Michael	Best Male	Nominated
1999	"As"	Best Song	Nominated
1999	"As"	Best Video	Nominated

== MTV Video Music Awards ==
The MTV Video Music Awards is an annual awards ceremony established in 1984 by MTV. Michael received four awards from sixteen nominations.

Year	Nominee / work	Award	Result
1988	"Father Figure"	Best Direction in a Video	Won
1988	"Father Figure"	Best Cinematography in a Video	Nominated
1988	"Faith"	Best Art Direction in a Video	Nominated
1989	George Michael	Video Vanguard (Career Achievement)	Won
1991	"Freedom! '90"	Best Cinematography in a Video	Nominated
1991	"Freedom! '90"	Best Direction in a Video	Nominated
1991	"Freedom! '90"	Best Male Video	Nominated
1991	"Freedom! '90"	Best Art Direction in a Video	Nominated
1991	"Freedom! '90"	Best Editing in a Video	Nominated
1993	"Papa Was a Rollin' Stone"	International Viewer's Choice Award—MTV Europe	Won
1993	"Papa Was a Rollin' Stone"	Best Male Video	Nominated
1993	"Papa Was a Rollin' Stone"	Breakthrough Video	Nominated
1996	"Fastlove"	International Viewer's Choice Award—MTV Europe	Won
1996	"Fastlove"	Best Dance Video	Nominated
1996	"Fastlove"	Best Choreography in a Video	Nominated
2009	"Freedom! '90"	Best Video (That Should Have Won a Moonman)	Nominated

== Music Week Awards ==
The Music Week Awards are the UK's only music awards that recognise labels, publishing, live, retail, A&R, radio, marketing and PR.

Year	Nominee / work	Award	Result
2018	Himself	Catalogue Marketing Champaign	Won
2021	Himself	Catalogue Marketing Champaign	Nominated
2023	Himself	Catalogue Marketing Champaign	Nominated

== Music Video Production Awards ==
The MVPA Awards are annually presented by a Los Angeles-based music trade organization to honor the year's best music videos.

Year	Nominee / work	Award	Result
2003	"Freeek!"	Best International Video	Won
2003	"Freeek!"	Best Special Effects	Won
2005	"Flawless (Go to the City)"	Best Pop Video	Nominated
2005	"Flawless (Go to the City)"	Best Director of a Male Artist	Nominated
2013	"White Light"	Director of the Year	Nominated

== NME Awards ==
The NME Awards are annual music awards show founded by the music magazine NME.

Year	Nominee / work	Award	Result
1997	Himself	Best Solo Artist	Nominated
2018	Freedom	Best Music Film	Nominated

== Pollstar Concert Industry Awards ==
The Pollstar Concert Industry Awards is an annual award ceremony to honor artists and professionals in the concert industry.

Year	Nominee / work	Award	Result
1989	The Faith Tour	Major Tour of the Year	Nominated
1989	The Faith Tour	Most Creative Stage Production	Nominated

== Rock and Roll Hall of Fame ==
The Rock and Roll Hall of Fame is a museum located on the shores of Lake Erie in downtown Cleveland, Ohio, United States, dedicated to the recording history of some of the best-known and most influential artists, producers, and other people who have influenced the music industry.

Year	Nominee / work	Award	Result
2023	Himself	Performer	Won

== Silver Clef Awards ==
The Silver Clef Awards are an annual British music awards lunch which has been running since 1976. Michael has received one award.

Year	Nominee / work	Award	Result
1989	Himself	Silver Clef Award	Won

== Smash Hits Poll Winners Party ==
The Smash Hits Poll Winners Party was an awards ceremony which ran from 1988 to 2005. Each award winner was voted by readers of the Smash Hits magazine.

Year	Nominee / work	Award	Result
1989	Himself	Best Male Solo Singer	Nominated
1990	Himself	Best Male Solo Singer	Nominated
1990	Himself	Most Fanciable Male	Nominated
1990	Himself	Best Dressed Person	Nominated
1990	Listen Without Prejudice Vol. 1	Best LP	Nominated
1990	"Praying for Time"	Best Single	Nominated
1991	Himself	Best Male Solo Singer	Nominated
1996	Himself	Best Male Solo Singer	Nominated

== TVZ Awards ==
The TVZ Awards was established in 1994 to honor the best in Brazilian music. In 1998, the award changed its name to Multishow Brazilian Music Awards.

Year	Nominee / work	Award	Result	Ref.
1996	Himself	Best International Male Singer	Won	

== UK Music Video Awards ==
The UK Music Video Awards is an annual award ceremony founded in 2008 to recognise creativity, technical excellence and innovation in music videos and moving images for music.

Year	Nominee / work	Award	Result
2012	"White Light"	Best Pop Video - UK	Nominated
2020	"Always" (with Waze & Odyssey, Mary J. Blige & Tommy Theo)	Best Dance/Electronic Video - UK	Nominated
2020	"Always" (with Waze & Odyssey, Mary J. Blige & Tommy Theo)	Best Choreography in a Video	Nominated

== Vodafone Live Music Awards ==
Year	Nominee / work	Award	Result	Ref.
2007	Himself	Best Show Production	Nominated	

== Žebřík Music Awards ==
Year	Nominee / work	Award	Result	Ref.
1996	"Fastlove"	Best International Video	Nominated	
2002	"Shoot the Dog"	Best International Video	Nominated	
2006	Twenty Five	Best International Music DVD	Nominated	
2011	Himself	Best International Male	Nominated	
2011	Symphonica Tour	Best International Live	Nominated	
2016	Death of George Michael	Best International Průser	Nominated	
