= 25 Live =

2006–08 concert tour by George Michael

- World tour by George Michael
- Promotional poster for the tour
- Location: Europe; North America; Middle East
- Associated album: Twenty Five
- Start date: 23 September 2006
- End date: 1 December 2008
- Legs: 3
- No. of shows: 106
- Supporting acts: Sophie Ellis-Bextor; Alicia Keys
- Attendance: 1.3 million

George Michael concert chronology
- Cover to Cover tour (1991); 25 Live (2006–08); George Michael Live in Australia (2010)

25 Live was a concert tour by English singer-songwriter George Michael. The tour was the most commercially successful tour of 2006–2007 in Europe, grossing over $200 million, with positive reviews from music critics. The 106 tour shows were performed in 41 countries and seen by 1.3 million fans across the globe.

== Background ==
25 Live was Michael's first tour in over 15 years. The tour, running for 50 dates, began in Barcelona on 23 September and was intended to end at Wembley Arena in London in December, but—due to great feedback from fans—continued into 2007 providing more gigs throughout Europe, concluding in Belfast. The tour is described as "a celebration of his 25-year career in music", and was accompanied by a greatest hits album, released in late 2006. The news of the tour came amid increased media speculation about Michael's personal life, in particular, his drug use and sex life. After the success of the autumn leg, new shows were added for summer 2007, in large arenas and stadiums. Pop star Sophie Ellis-Bextor was announced as the supporting act for six of the eight UK shows. She did not open the show at Wembley Stadium as Michael was the first artist ever to play in the new stadium.

On 25 March 2008, a third leg of the 25 Live tour was announced for North America. This leg included 21 dates in the United States and Canada. This was Michael's first tour of North America in 17 years. The tour coincided with the release of his new greatest hits album on 1 April 2008.

=== Final shows ===
On 11 June 2008, two dates were added, titled "The Final Two", taking place at Earls Court in London on 24 and 25 August 2008. These concerts were filmed for a DVD release entitled Live in London.

On 30 August 2008, Michael performed one more last show at Parken Stadium in Copenhagen, Denmark. This special performance, entitled "The Final One", allowed Michael to say "thank you" to his loyal fans, not only in Scandinavia, but also across Europe. Tickets for the show reportedly sold out in 54 minutes.

On 25 October 2008, it was announced that Michael would perform another last concert, this time to be held at the Zayed Sports City Stadium in Abu Dhabi, UAE, on 1 December 2008. American singer and songwriter Alicia Keys was announced as the support act. The show marked Michael's first concert in the Middle East. The event also helped to launch and was part of UAE's National Day festivities, "complete with obligatory fireworks and a laser display".

=== Australian leg ===
Australian dates were added in November 2009, involving stops in Perth, Sydney, and later Melbourne in February/March 2010.

== Commercial reception ==
Ticket sales in Europe were brisk. Within two hours of initial sales, 240,000 tickets were snatched up by eager fans. First to sell out were UK shows in London's Wembley Arena and Earls Court as well as Birmingham's NEC Arena and Manchester MEN Arena. The Manchester show sold out within minutes, and the two 25 Live dates added to the venue were sold out by lunchtime. To meet demand, 14 gigs were added to the tour, including three additional shows in London alone. Michael's dates around Europe were met with equally extraordinary enthusiasm. In Norway, the Oslo show at the Oslo Spektrum sold out in an hour and a half. In Copenhagen, 49,000 tickets sold out at the Parken Stadium in just three hours. The first Rotterdam concert at Rotterdam Ahoy arena sold out in a mere six minutes, and the second saw tickets vanish in 16 minutes. In fact, a third Rotterdam show was added by popular demand that also sold out in 16 minutes. This unprecedented response has stood out as the fastest sell of tickets ever experienced by Barrie Marshall, whose London-based promotion firm, Marshall Arts Limited, has been promoting shows for 30 years.

In North America, although ticket sales weren't fast as they were in Europe, every venue was sold out in time for the concert. For a period of 25 hours during the week leading up to the Los Angeles show on 25 June 2008, tickets were sold for a promotional price of $25 (down from $95) in celebration of Michael's birthday, 25 June 1963.

All the tickets for the Final Two shows in London and the Final One show in Denmark were sold out in 2 hours.

== Critical reception ==
The tour received positive reviews, with praise for the set list and overall production of the show.

== Set lists ==
First leg

1. "Waiting (Reprise)"
2. "Flawless (Go to the City)"
3. "Fastlove"
4. "Father Figure"
5. "Star People '97"
6. "The First Time Ever I Saw Your Face"
7. "Praying for Time"
8. "Too Funky"
9. "You Have Been Loved"
10. "Everything She Wants"
11. "My Mother Had a Brother"
12. "Shoot the Dog"
  Break
13. "Faith"
14. "Spinning the Wheel"
15. "Jesus to a Child"
16. "An Easier Affair"
17. "A Different Corner"
18. "Amazing"
19. "I'm Your Man"
20. "Outside"
  Encore
21. "Careless Whisper"
22. "Freedom! '90"

Second leg

1. "Waiting (Reprise)"
2. "Flawless (Go to the City)"
3. "Fastlove"
4. "Precious Box"
5. "Father Figure"
6. "Everything She Wants"
7. "Ticking"
8. "Praying for Time"
9. "Too Funky"
10. "Star People '97"
11. "Shoot the Dog"
  Break
12. "Faith"
13. "Spinning the Wheel"
14. "An Easier Affair"
15. "Jesus to a Child"
16. "Amazing"
17. "I'm Your Man"
18. "Outside"
  Encore
19. "Careless Whisper"
20. "Freedom! '90"

Third leg

1. "Waiting (Reprise)"
2. "Fastlove"
3. "I'm Your Man"
4. "The First Time Ever I Saw Your Face"
5. "Father Figure"
6. "Hard Day"
7. "Everything She Wants"
8. "One More Try"
9. "A Different Corner"
10. "An Easier Affair"
11. "Too Funky"
12. "Star People '97"
  Break
13. "Faith"
14. "Feeling Good"
15. "Roxanne"
16. "Spinning the Wheel"
17. "Kissing a Fool"
18. "Amazing"
19. "Flawless (Go to the City)"
20. "Outside"
21. "Praying for Time"
  Encore
22. "Careless Whisper"
23. "Freedom! '90"

The Final Two

1. "Waiting (Reprise)"
2. "Fastlove"
3. "I'm Your Man"
4. "Father Figure"
5. "Hard Day"
6. "Everything She Wants"
7. "One More Try"
8. "The First Time Ever I Saw Your Face"
9. "An Easier Affair"
10. "Too Funky"
11. "Star People '97"
  Break
12. "Faith"
13. "Spinning the Wheel"
14. "Feeling Good"
15. "Roxanne"
16. "Amazing"
17. "Flawless (Go to the City)"
18. "Outside"
  Encore
19. "A Different Corner"
20. "Careless Whisper"
21. "Freedom! '90"

The Final One

1. "Waiting (Reprise)"
2. "Fastlove"
3. "I'm Your Man"
4. "Father Figure"
5. "You Have Been Loved"
6. "Everything She Wants"
7. "Precious Box"
8. "One More Try"
9. "Jesus to a Child"
10. "An Easier Affair"
11. "Too Funky"
12. "Shoot the Dog"
  Break
13. "Faith"
14. "Spinning the Wheel"
15. "Feeling Good"
16. "Kissing a Fool"
17. "Roxanne"
18. "Amazing"
19. "Flawless (Go to the City)"
20. "Outside"
  Encore
21. "Careless Whisper"
22. "Freedom! '90"

=== Additional notes ===
- During the 17 December 2006 show at Wembley Arena, Michael exclusively performed "Last Christmas". A recording of the performance was later included on the 2024 reissue of the single, marking the 40th anniversary since its release in 1984.

== Tour dates ==
List of European concerts
| Date (2006) | City | Country | Venue | Opening act | Attendance (Tickets sold / available) | Revenue |
|---|---|---|---|---|---|---|
| 23 September | Barcelona | Spain | Palau Sant Jordi | —N/a | 19,836 / 19,836 | $2,062,948 |
| 26 September | Madrid | Spain | Palacio de Deportes de la Comunidad de Madrid | —N/a | 14,590 / 14,590 | $1,517,364 |
| 29 September | Toulouse | France | Zénith de Toulouse | —N/a | 6,192 / 6,192 | $643,692 |
| 30 September | Toulon | France | Zénith Oméga | —N/a | 6,487 / 6,487 | $674,638 |
| 2 October | Lyon | France | Halle Tony Garnier | —N/a | 8,082 / 8,082 | $840,531 |
| 5 October | Milan | Italy | Mediolanum Forum | —N/a | 22,936 / 22,936 | $2,385,346 |
| 6 October | Milan | Italy | Mediolanum Forum | —N/a | 22,936 / 22,936 | $2,385,346 |
| 9 October | Paris | France | Palais omnisports de Paris Bercy | —N/a | 30,106 / 30,106 | $3,522,408 |
| 10 October | Paris | France | Palais omnisports de Paris Bercy | —N/a | 30,106 / 30,106 | $3,522,408 |
| 13 October | Amnéville | France | Galaxie Amnéville | —N/a | 12,659 / 12,659 | $1,569,174 |
| 14 October | Stuttgart | Germany | Hanns-Martin-Schleyer-Halle | —N/a | 9,124 / 9,124 | $1,040,136 |
| 16 October | Leipzig | Germany | Arena Leipzig | —N/a | 11,047 / 11,047 | $1,358,788 |
| 17 October | Oberhausen | Germany | König Pilsener Arena | —N/a | 14,000 / 14,000 | $1,453,036 |
| 20 October | Gothenburg | Sweden | Scandinavium | —N/a | 13,825 / 13,825 | $1,492,102 |
| 21 October | Oslo | Norway | Oslo Spektrum | —N/a | 12,264 / 12,264 | $1,287,726 |
| 22 October | Stockholm | Sweden | Stockholm Globe Arena | —N/a | 16,511 / 16,511 | $1,717,142 |
| 25 October | Frankfurt | Germany | Festhalle Frankfurt | —N/a | 12,275 / 13,034 | $1,264,359 |
| 26 October | Zürich | Switzerland | Hallenstadion | —N/a | 13,000 / 13,000 | $1,376,050 |
| 29 October | Munich | Germany | Olympiahalle | —N/a | 29,472 / 29,472 | $3,166,412 |
| 30 October | Munich | Germany | Olympiahalle | —N/a | 29,472 / 29,472 | $3,166,412 |
| 1 November | Rotterdam | Netherlands | Sportpaleis van Ahoy | —N/a | 59,412 / 59,412 | $6,416,499 |
| 2 November | Rotterdam | Netherlands | Sportpaleis van Ahoy | —N/a | 59,412 / 59,412 | $6,416,499 |
| 4 November | Rotterdam | Netherlands | Sportpaleis van Ahoy | —N/a | 59,412 / 59,412 | $6,416,499 |
| 6 November | Berlin | Germany | Velodrom | —N/a | 7,026 / 7,026 | $955,530 |
| 7 November | Hamburg | Germany | Color Line Arena | —N/a | 9,275 / 9,275 | $1,317,053 |
| 9 November | Mannheim | Germany | SAP Arena | —N/a | 9,673 / 9,673 | $1,102,726 |
| 11 November | Copenhagen | Denmark | Parken Stadium | —N/a | 46,918 / 46,918 | $6,052,422 |
| 13 November | Cologne | Germany | Kölnarena | —N/a | 12,124 / 12,124 | $1,757,920 |
| 14 November | Antwerp | Belgium | Sportpaleis | —N/a | 16,231 / 16,235 | $1,227,164 |
| 17 November | Manchester | England | Manchester Evening News Arena | —N/a | 65,292 / 65,292 | $9,271,547 |
| 18 November | Manchester | England | Manchester Evening News Arena | —N/a | 65,292 / 65,292 | $9,271,547 |
| 21 November | Manchester | England | Manchester Evening News Arena | —N/a | 65,292 / 65,292 | $9,271,547 |
| 22 November | Glasgow | Scotland | SECC Arena | —N/a | 26,145 / 26,145 | $3,294,273 |
| 25 November | London | England | Earls Court | —N/a | 36,228 / 36,228 | $3,840,169 |
| 26 November | London | England | Earls Court | —N/a | 36,228 / 36,228 | $3,840,169 |
| 28 November | London | England | Earls Court | —N/a | 36,228 / 36,228 | $3,840,169 |
| 2 December | Birmingham | England | NEC Arena | —N/a | 50,523 / 50,523 | $6,669,042 |
| 3 December | Birmingham | England | NEC Arena | —N/a | 50,523 / 50,523 | $6,669,042 |
| 4 December | Birmingham | England | NEC Arena | —N/a | 50,523 / 50,523 | $6,669,042 |
| 7 December | Dublin | Ireland | Point Theatre | —N/a | 25,020 / 25,020 | $3,123,926 |
| 8 December | Dublin | Ireland | Point Theatre | —N/a | 25,020 / 25,020 | $3,123,926 |
| 11 December | London | England | Wembley Arena | —N/a | 41,180 / 41,180 | $5,806,283 |
| 12 December | London | England | Wembley Arena | —N/a | 41,180 / 41,180 | $5,806,283 |
| 14 December | London | England | Wembley Arena | —N/a | 41,180 / 41,180 | $5,806,283 |
| 15 December | London | England | Wembley Arena | —N/a | 41,180 / 41,180 | $5,806,283 |
| 17 December | London | England | Wembley Arena | —N/a | 41,180 / 41,180 | $5,806,283 |

List of European concerts
| Date (2007) | City | Country | Venue | Opening act | Attendance (Tickets sold / available) | Revenue |
|---|---|---|---|---|---|---|
| 12 May | Coimbra | Portugal | Estádio Cidade de Coimbra | —N/a | 39,639 / 39,639 | $4,439,568 |
| 18 May | Aarhus | Denmark | Atletion | —N/a | 44,966 / 44,966 | $2,080,026 |
| 19 May | Aarhus | Denmark | Atletion | —N/a | 44,966 / 44,966 | $2,080,026 |
| 23 May | Budapest | Hungary | Ferenc Puskás Stadium | —N/a | 52,047 / 52,047 | $2,133,947 |
| 25 May | Bratislava | Slovakia | Inter Football Stadium | —N/a | 6,875 / 15,801 | $855,295 |
| 28 May | Sofia | Bulgaria | Lokomotiv Stadium | —N/a | 25,003 / 25,003 | $1,125,184 |
| 31 May | Bucharest | Romania | Arena Națională | —N/a | 13,902 / 13,902 | $2,432,846 |
| 6 June | Dublin | Ireland | RDS Arena | Sophie Ellis-Bextor | 64,154 / 64,154 | $7,698,459 |
| 9 June | London | England | Wembley Stadium | —N/a | 172,458 / 172,458 | $24,490,995 |
| 10 June | London | England | Wembley Stadium | —N/a | 172,458 / 172,458 | $24,490,995 |
| 12 June | Norwich | England | Carrow Road | Sophie Ellis-Bextor | 54,275 / 54,275 | $7,869,385 |
| 15 June | Manchester | England | City of Manchester Stadium | Sophie Ellis-Bextor | 60,195 / 60,195 | $8,728,294 |
| 17 June | Glasgow | Scotland | Hampden Park | Sophie Ellis-Bextor | 53,024 / 53,024 | $7,751,504 |
| 19 June | Plymouth | England | Home Park | Sophie Ellis-Bextor | 38,402 / 38,402 | $5,491,886 |
| 22 June | Saint-Denis | France | Stade de France | —N/a | 63,583 / 63,583 | $9,473,837 |
| 23 June | Antwerp | Belgium | Sportpaleis | —N/a | 14,230 / 14,230 | $2,020,550 |
| 26 June | Amsterdam | Netherlands | Amsterdam Arena | —N/a | 55,384 / 55,384 | $8,085,064 |
| 29 June | Stockholm | Sweden | Stockholm Globe Arena | —N/a | | |
| 1 July | Helsinki | Finland | Hartwall Arena | —N/a | | |
| 5 July | Moscow | Russia | Olympisky | —N/a | | |
| 6 July | Moscow | Russia | Olympisky | —N/a | | |
| 9 July | Kyiv | Ukraine | Olympic Stadium | —N/a | | |
| 11 July | Warsaw | Poland | Służewiec | —N/a | 35,000 | |
| 13 July | Vienna | Austria | Wiener Stadthalle | —N/a | | |
| 17 July | Padua | Italy | Stadio Plebiscito | —N/a | | |
| 19 July | Lucca | Italy | Stadio Porta Elisa | —N/a | | |
| 21 July | Rome | Italy | Stadio Olimpico | —N/a | | |
| 26 July | Athens | Greece | OAKA Olympic Stadium | —N/a | 40,000 | 5,340,316 |
| 1 August | Dublin | Ireland | Point Theatre | —N/a | | |
| 2 August | Dublin | Ireland | Point Theatre | —N/a | | |
| 4 August | Belfast | Northern Ireland | Odyssey Arena | —N/a | | |

List of North American concerts
| Date (2008) | City | Country | Venue | Opening act | Attendance (Tickets sold / available) | Revenue |
|---|---|---|---|---|---|---|
| 17 June | San Diego | United States | San Diego Sports Arena | —N/a | | |
| 19 June | San Jose | United States | HP Pavilion | —N/a | | |
| 21 June | Las Vegas | United States | MGM Grand Garden Arena | —N/a | | |
| 22 June | Phoenix | United States | US Airways Center | —N/a | | |
| 25 June | Inglewood | United States | The Forum | —N/a | | |
| 27 June | Anaheim | United States | Honda Center | —N/a | | |
| 2 July | Seattle | United States | KeyArena | —N/a | | |
| 4 July | Vancouver | Canada | General Motors Place | —N/a | 12,000 / 15,000 | |
| 7 July | Saint Paul | United States | Xcel Energy Center | —N/a | 7,504 / 12,999 | |
| 9 July | Chicago | United States | United Center | —N/a | 10,061 / 13,500 | $1,375,690 |
| 13 July | Dallas | United States | American Airlines Center | —N/a | | |
| 14 July | Houston | United States | Toyota Center | —N/a | 7,965 / 9,221 | $779,810 |
| 17 July | Toronto | Canada | Air Canada Centre | —N/a | 14,802 / 14,802 | $2,115,255 |
| 18 July | Montreal | Canada | Bell Centre | —N/a | 9,865 / 9,865 | $1,454,257 |
| 21 July | New York City | United States | Madison Square Garden | —N/a | | |
| 23 July | New York City | United States | Madison Square Garden | —N/a | | |
| 26 July | Philadelphia | United States | Wachovia Center | —N/a | | |
| 27 July | Boston | United States | TD Banknorth Garden | —N/a | 10,325 / 14,000 | |
| 29 July | Washington, D.C. | United States | Verizon Center | —N/a | 8,331 / 13,000 | $1,055,827 |
| 31 July | Atlanta | United States | Philips Arena | —N/a | | |
| 2 August | Tampa | United States | St. Pete Times Forum | —N/a | 8,925 / 13,911 | $948,764 |
| 3 August | Sunrise | United States | Bank Atlantic Center | —N/a | | |

List of European and Middle Eastern concerts
| Date (2008) | City | Country | Venue | Opening act | Attendance (Tickets sold / available) | Revenue |
|---|---|---|---|---|---|---|
| 24 August | London | England | Earls Court | —N/a | | |
| 25 August | London | England | Earls Court | —N/a | | |
| 30 August | Copenhagen | Denmark | Parken Stadium | —N/a | | |
| 1 December | Abu Dhabi | United Arab Emirates | Zayed Sports City Stadium | Alicia Keys | | |

=== Cancelled concerts ===
List of cancelled concerts
| Date (2007) | City | Country | Venue | Reason |
|---|---|---|---|---|
| 2 June | Prague | Czech Republic | Sazka Arena | Accident with equipment |
| 7 June | Dublin | Ireland | RDS Arena | Accident with equipment |
| 15 July (Note: The 15 July 2007 show in Nürnberg, Germany, was originally scheduled to take place on 28 May 2007 in Düsseldorf, Germany, but was postponed due to technical difficulties.) | Nürnberg | Germany | easyCredit-Stadion | N/A |

== Personnel ==
=== Band ===
- George Michael – vocals
- Chris Cameron – musical director, arranger
- Lea Mullen – percussion
- Phil Palmer – guitars
- Andy Hamilton – sax, keyboards, EWI (electronic wind instrument)
- Steve Walters – bass
- Mike Brown – guitars
- Carlos Hercules – drums
- Graham Kearns – guitars
- Luke Smith – keyboards
- Shirley Lewis – backing vocals
- Jay Henry – backing vocals
- Lincoln Jean-Marie – backing vocals
- Lori Perry – backing vocals
- Sharon Perry – backing vocals
- Lucy Jules – backing vocals

=== Management and production ===
- Michael Lippman – artist manager
- Andy Stephens – artist manager
- Ken Watts – tour director
- Lisa Johnson – assistant tour director
- Looloo Murphy – GM tour manager
- Sharon Ashley – band tour manager
- Ronnie Franklin – security consultant
- Mark Spring – production manager
- Di Eichorst – production coordinator
- Scott Chase – stage manager
- James Kelly – show manager
- Willie Williams – video staging designer and director
- Vince Foster – set and lighting design and operator
- Gary Bradshaw – front of house sound
- Andy Bramley – video director
- Simeon Niel-Asher – Osteopath
- Barrie Marshall and Doris Dixon – agents

=== Promoters ===
- Belgium – Live Nation
- Denmark – DKB & Motor
- France – Interconcerts
- Germany – Peter Rieger Konzertagentur
- Greece – Cosmote
- Netherlands – MOJO Concerts
- Hungary – Live Nation Hungary (previously Multimedia Concerts)
- Ireland – Aiken Promotions
- Italy – D'Alessandro E Galli
- Norway – Gunnar Eide
- Spain – Sagliocco Group
- Sweden – EMA Telstar
- Switzerland – Good News
- UK – Marshall Arts
- USA – Live Nation
- Australia – Paul Dainty

== Features ==
- The 25 Live tour marked the first time a 3000 piece LED screen has been used.
- The 25 Live tour featured a three dimensional video wall. The video screen was not just a backdrop to the stage, it also laid on the stage surface. Paul McCartney used a similar concept for his 2005 US Tour.
- The 25 Live tour marked the first time motion tracking came from the artist to video.
- The 25 Live tour marked the first time 490 frequency channels were transmitted to the audio mixing board, producing dynamic, richer sound for the performance.
- The 25 Live tour marked the first time on-screen visuals responded to the musicians performing.

== Other details ==
- On 20 December 2006, Michael performed a free concert for NHS nurses at the Roundhouse in north London. Michael claimed he wanted to thank the nurses who had cared for his late mother, Lesley Angold Panayiotou, who died of cancer in 1997.
- On 31 December 2006, Michael was paid $3 million for a 75-minute private concert in Moscow, Russia, which made him the highest paid entertainer in Russian history.
- Michael became the first music artist to perform at the new Wembley Stadium when he played two shows at the venue on 9 June 2007 and 10 June 2007 during the tour.
- During his concert in Sofia, Bulgaria, Michael devoted to the Bulgarian nurses prosecuted in the HIV trial in Libya.
- On 17 June 2008, Michael launched the North American leg of his final world tour by congratulating lawmakers for legalising gay marriage in California.
- On 25 June 2008, during the L.A. concert, Michael celebrated his 45th birthday. The band played "Happy Birthday", while Bo Derek walked on stage with a huge birthday cake.
- On 27 July 2008, Michael's concert at TD Banknorth Garden in Boston was delayed 1½ hours due to weather conditions and flight delays. He later apologized for the delay and despite the holdup, played a full 3-hour set.
