= Symphonica Tour =

2011–12 concert tour by George Michael

Symphonica: The Orchestral Tour
- Tour by George Michael
- Promotional poster for LG Arena, Birmingham show
- Location: Europe
- Start date: 22 August 2011
- End date: 17 October 2012
- Legs: 2
- No. of shows: 67 (75 scheduled)

George Michael concert chronology
- George Michael Live in Australia (2010); Symphonica (2011–12)

Symphonica (also promoted as Symphonica: The Orchestral Tour) was an orchestral concert tour by George Michael and his last tour. The singer performed the songs mainly from Songs from the Last Century and Patience albums as well as some cover versions in new arrangements.

== Background ==
The tour was officially announced on 11 May 2011. Due to high demand for tickets, extra shows were added in Dublin, London, Birmingham, Manchester, Glasgow, Cardiff, Rotterdam, Herning and Verona. A Brussels show was later announced on 3 June. Milan and Copenhagen shows were later announced.

Many of the shows had already sold out completely. Prague, Antwerp, Rotterdam, London (Royal Albert Hall and Royal Opera House), Dublin, Cardiff, Sheffield and Newcastle had all sold out.

The show included four new core band members who were selected by producer Phil Ramone and George Michael. These new members included musical director and pianist Henry Hey, guitarist Ben Butler, bassist David Finck, and drummer Mark McLean. In addition, percussionist Lea Mullen and guitarist Phil Palmer completed the band, along with Michael's long-time background vocalists Shirley Lewis, Lucy Jules, Lincoln Jean-Marie and Jay Henry. The stage had a semi-oval shape with a huge screen projecting different visual effects, sometimes featuring Michael himself. Some visuals were taken from the previous tour.

On 25 November, it was announced that all further concerts in 2011 had been cancelled due to Michael's illness. Eventually, it took longer time for Michael to recover, resulting in all concerts postponed and scheduled for April and May being postponed to October and November 2012.

On 3 May 2012, it was announced that shows in Australia scheduled for early April would be postponed to November 2012. His performance in Perth on 10 November would have been the headline act for the Perth Arena Gala Opening. Due to recovery restrictions from the illness, Michael was eventually forced to cancel all Australian dates.

It was announced on Michael's website that his album Symphonica, released on 17 March 2014, would consist of studio material initially rehearsed for this tour including some live recordings.

== Opening acts ==
- Wrocław Philharmonic Orchestra (Poland)
- Czech National Symphony Orchestra (Prague)

== Setlist ==
The setlist of the premiere concert on 22 August 2011 at State Opera House – Prague, Czech Republic.

1. "Through"
2. "My Baby Just Cares for Me"
3. "Cowboys and Angels"
4. "True Faith"
5. "Let Her Down Easy" (Terence Trent D'Arby cover)
6. "Kissing a Fool"
7. "Going to a Town"
8. "Roxanne"
9. "It Doesn't Really Matter"
10. "Brother, Can You Spare a Dime?"
  Intermission
11. "Patience"
12. "John and Elvis Are Dead"
13. "Russian Roulette"
14. "You Have Been Loved"
15. "You've Changed"
16. "Love Is a Losing Game"
17. "Where I Hope You Are"
18. "Praying for Time"
19. "Wild Is the Wind"
20. "A Different Corner"
21. "Feeling Good"
22. "You and I"
  Encore
23. "Amazing" / "I'm Your Man" / "Freedom! '90"

=== Additional notes ===
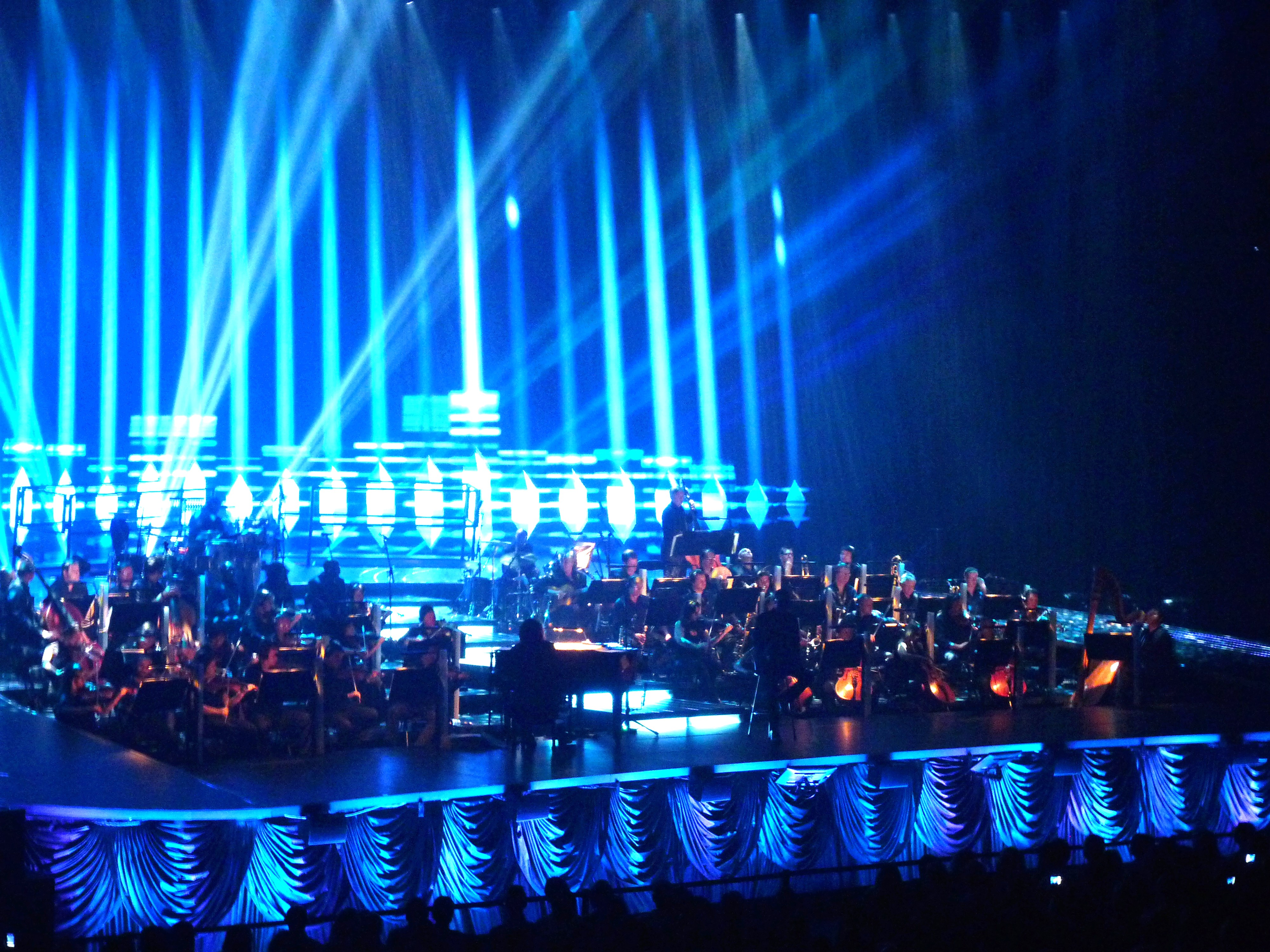
George Michael's symphony orchestra

- Closer to the end of the intermission a mix of different Michael's songs including "A Different Corner", "Older" and "John and Elvis Are Dead" was played with some light effects.
- From the 3 September concert at Forum Copenhagen Michael performed the song "Understand" replacing "You and I".
- On 17 September, Michael performed a concert to celebrate the opening of a new stadium in Wrocław. He performed with the Wrocław Philharmonic Orchestra.
- From the 19 September concert at Budapest Sportaréna Michael performed Elton John's song "Idol" replacing "It Doesn't Really Matter".
- From the 7 October concert at Antwerp SportPaleis Michael performed "Song to the Siren" replacing "Understand".
- Michael performed the song "Safe" at the 29 October concert in London's Royal Albert Hall and the 1 and 3 November concerts in Dublin's The O_{2}.
- From the 14 November concert at Prague O_{2}Arena Michael performed the song "The Recluse" replacing "Kissing a Fool".
- During the second leg of the tour in 2012 the songs "Idol", "Song to the Siren", "You and I" and "Where I Hope You Are" were removed, the song "Father Figure" added to the first half of the setlist, the first song after the intermission was changed to "Waiting for that Day" and "Love Is a Losing Game" was not performed as well. Additionally, the last song performed live was "White Light".
- On 16 September in Birmingham, Michael finished the concert with the song "I Remember You" instead of "White Light".
- On 9 October in Manchester, Michael finished the concert with the song "I Remember You" instead of "White Light" and performed "Star People" and "F.E.A.R." by Ian Brown.
- At the concert in Liverpool and final shows in London Michael would finish the concert with "I Remember You".

== Tour dates ==
List of 2011 concerts
Date	City	Country	Venue	Attendance (Tickets sold / available)	Revenue
22 August	Prague	Czech Republic	State Opera House		
29 August	Herning	Denmark	Jyske Bank Boxen		
31 August	Herning	Denmark	Jyske Bank Boxen		
2 September	Herning	Denmark	Jyske Bank Boxen		
3 September	Copenhagen	Denmark	Forum Copenhagen		
5 September	Berlin	Germany	Mercedes-Benz Arena		
7 September	Cologne	Germany	Lanxess Arena		
8 September	Mannheim	Germany	SAP Arena		
10 September	Florence	Italy	Piazza Santa Croce		
11 September	Naples	Italy	Arena Italsider		
13 September	Verona	Italy	Verona Arena		
14 September	Verona	Italy	Verona Arena		
17 September	Wrocław	Poland	Stadion Miejski		
19 September	Budapest	Hungary	László Papp Budapest Sports Arena		
20 September	Zagreb	Croatia	Arena Zagreb		
22 September	Nice	France	Palais Nikaïa		
24 September	Bilbao	Spain	Bizkaia Arena		
25 September	Madrid	Spain	Barclaycard Center Madrid		
27 September	Barcelona	Spain	Palau Sant Jordi		
28 September	Marseille	France	Le Silo		
30 September	Toulouse	France	Zénith de Toulouse		
1 October	Montpellier	France	Park&Suites Arena		
3 October	Paris	France	AccorHotels Arena		
4 October	Paris	France	AccorHotels Arena		
7 October	Antwerp	Belgium	Sportpaleis	13,052 / 13,437	$1,457,370
8 October	Brussels	Belgium	Forest National		
10 October	Rotterdam	Netherlands	Rotterdam Ahoy		
12 October	Stuttgart	Germany	Hanns-Martin-Schleyer-Halle		
14 October	Zürich	Switzerland	Hallenstadion		
15 October	Geneva	Switzerland	SEG Geneva Arena		
18 October	Hamburg	Germany	Barclaycard Arena Hamburg	11,099 / 11,897	$921,594
19 October	Hanover	Germany	TUI Arena		
21 October	Rotterdam	Netherlands	Rotterdam Ahoy		
22 October	Rotterdam	Netherlands	Rotterdam Ahoy		
25 October	London	England	Royal Albert Hall		
28 October	London	England	Royal Albert Hall		
29 October	London	England	Royal Albert Hall		
1 November	Dublin	Ireland	3Arena		
3 November	Dublin	Ireland	3Arena		
6 November	London	England	Royal Opera House		
9 November	Oberhausen	Germany	König Pilsener Arena		
11 November	Milan	Italy	Mediolanum Forum		
12 November	Milan	Italy	Mediolanum Forum		
14 November	Prague	Czech Republic	O_{2} Arena		
15 November	Berlin	Germany	Mercedes-Benz Arena	7,341 / 7,341	$382,960
17 November	Munich	Germany	Olympiahalle		
19 November	Frankfurt	Germany	Festhalle Frankfurt		

List of 2012 concerts
Date	City	Country	Venue	Attendance (Tickets sold / available)	Revenue
4 September	Vienna	Austria	Wiener Stadthalle		
6 September	Vienna	Austria	Wiener Stadthalle		
9 September	Paris	France	Palais Garnier		
11 September	Brussels	Belgium	Forest National		
14 September	Amsterdam	Netherlands	Ziggo Dome		
16 September	Birmingham	England	LG Arena		
17 September	Birmingham	England	LG Arena		
21 September	Manchester	England	Manchester Arena	11,356 / 12,876	$1,535,440
23 September	Glasgow	Scotland	Scottish Exhibition and Conference Centre		
24 September	Glasgow	Scotland	Scottish Exhibition and Conference Centre		
29 September	London	England	Royal Albert Hall		
1 October	Sheffield	England	Sheffield Arena		
3 October	Newcastle	England	Metro Radio Arena		
5 October	Cardiff	Wales	Motorpoint Arena Cardiff		
6 October	Cardiff	Wales	Motorpoint Arena Cardiff		
9 October	Manchester	England	Manchester Arena	8,756 / 9,544	$1,181,680
10 October	Liverpool	England	Echo Arena Liverpool		
13 October	London	England	Earls Court		
14 October	London	England	Earls Court		
17 October	London	England	Earls Court		

=== Cancelled and rescheduled concerts ===
List of cancelled and rescheduled concerts
Date	City	Country	Venue	Reason
26 October 2011	London	England	Royal Albert Hall	Postponed to 2 May 2012
2 May 2012	London	England	Royal Albert Hall	Postponed to 29 September
21 November 2011	Vienna	Austria	Stadthalle	Postponed to 6 September 2012
23 November 2011	Strasbourg	France	Zénith	Cancelled
26 November 2011	Cardiff	Wales	Motorpoint Arena	Postponed to 5 October 2012
27 November 2011	Cardiff	Wales	Motorpoint Arena	Postponed to 6 October 2012
30 November 2011	Liverpool	England	Echo Arena	Postponed to 10 October 2012
2 December 2011	Sheffield	England	Motorpoint Arena	Postponed to 1 October 2012
3 December 2011	Newcastle	England	Metro Radio Arena	Postponed to 3 October 2012
6–7 December 2011	Glasgow	Scotland	SECC	Postponed to 23–24 September 2012
9–10 December 2011	Birmingham	England	Genting Arena	Postponed to 16–17 September 2012
12–13 December 2011	Manchester	England	Manchester Arena	Postponed to 21 September and 9 October 2012
16–19 December 2011	London	England	Earls Court	Postponed to 13, 14 and 17 October 2012
10 November 2012	Perth	Australia	Perth Arena	Cancelled
13–14 November 2012	Adelaide	Australia	Adelaide Entertainment Centre	Cancelled
17–18 November 2012	Sydney	Australia	Sydney SuperDome	Cancelled
21–22 November 2012	Melbourne	Australia	Rod Laver Arena	Cancelled
27 November 2012	Brisbane	Australia	Brisbane Entertainment Centre	Cancelled
1 December 2012	Hunter Valley	Australia	Hope Estate Winery	Cancelled
