= Twenty Five (album) =

Greatest hits album by George Michael
- Released: 13 November 2006
- Recorded: 1984–2006
- Genre: Pop
- Length: 78:21 (disc 1); 77:41 (disc 2); 71:05 (disc 3)
- Label: Sony BMG
- Producer: George Michael

George Michael chronology
Patience (2004)	Twenty Five (2006)	Symphonica (2014)

Singles from Twenty Five
- 1. "An Easier Affair" Released: 3 July 2006; 2. "This Is Not Real Love" Released: 6 November 2006

Professional ratings
Review scores
Source	Rating
AllMusic	4/5 stars
PopMatters	(8/10)
The Times	3/5 stars

Twenty Five is the second compilation album by English singer-songwriter George Michael, released in the UK on 13 November 2006, celebrating the 25th anniversary of his music career. It was released on 13 November 2006 by Sony BMG. It debuted at number one on the UK Albums Chart and number 23 on the Billboard 200, and it reached the top 20 on most other album charts. After Michael's death in December 2016, the album re-entered the Billboard 200 at a new peak position of number 12.

The album mostly contains songs from Michael's solo career but also from his earlier days with Wham!. The album is sold in two formats: a 2-CD set and a limited edition 3-CD set. The 2-CD set contains 29 tracks, including four recorded with Wham! and three new songs: "An Easier Affair", "This Is Not Real Love" (a duet with the English singer Mutya Buena) and a new version of "Heal the Pain", recorded with Paul McCartney. The limited edition 3-CD version contains an additional 14 lesser-known tracks, including one with Wham! and another new song called "Understand".

The 2-CD version was released in the United States on 1 April 2008, with two changes: "Feeling Good" replaced the Wham! track "Freedom", and "The First Time Ever I Saw Your Face" (from Songs from the Last Century) replaced "Round Here", a track from Patience that was not released as a single in the US.

A 3-CD limited deluxe version was released in the United States exclusively by Best Buy. The track listing for the third CD is the same as the international version, but unlike the 2-CD US version, it includes "Freedom" instead of "Feeling Good". The 3-CD version is packaged in a digipak. It includes a 36-page colour booklet with lyrics for every track, along with screen shots from the videos for most of the tracks on the first two CDs.

In 2010, a special tour edition of the album was released in Australia to coincide with Michael's short three date George Michael Live in Australia tour. The track listing itself contained the same tracks as the international version alongside a bonus third disc. A Twenty Five DVD was also released.

== Track listing ==
=== Disc 1: For Living ===
For Living – International edition
No.	Title	Original album	Length
1.	"Everything She Wants" (12" remix)	Make It Big (original version)	6:33
2.	"Wake Me Up Before You Go-Go"	Make It Big	3:52
3.	"Freedom"	Make It Big	5:20
4.	"Faith"	Faith	3:13
5.	"Too Funky" (single version)	Red Hot + Dance (extended version)	3:45
6.	"Fastlove"	Older	5:27
7.	"Freedom! '90"	Listen Without Prejudice Vol. 1	6:30
8.	"Spinning the Wheel"	Older	6:09
9.	"Outside"	Ladies & Gentlemen	4:44
10.	"As" (with Mary J. Blige)	Ladies & Gentlemen	4:42
11.	"Freeek!" (single version)	Patience ("Freeek! '04")	4:33
12.	"Shoot the Dog"	Patience	5:08
13.	"Amazing"	Patience	4:24
14.	"Flawless (Go to the City)" (vs. The Ones – radio edit)	Patience (original version)	4:50
15.	"An Easier Affair"	New recording	4:36

For Living – US edition
No.	Title	Original album	Length
3.	"Feeling Good"	New recording	2:54

For Living – Japanese bonus track
No.	Title	Original album	Length
16.	"Kissing a Fool"	Faith	4:35

=== Disc 2: For Loving ===
For Loving – International edition
No.	Title	Original album	Length
1.	"Careless Whisper" (single edit)	Make It Big (extended version)	5:00
2.	"Last Christmas" (single edit)	Music from the Edge of Heaven (Pudding Mix)	4:27
3.	"A Different Corner" (single edit)	Music from the Edge of Heaven (Album Ver.)	4:03
4.	"Father Figure"	Faith	5:37
5.	"One More Try"	Faith	5:53
6.	"Praying for Time"	Listen Without Prejudice Vol. 1	4:41
7.	"Heal the Pain" (with Paul McCartney)	New recording	4:43
8.	"Don't Let the Sun Go Down on Me" (with Elton John – live)	Non-Album Single	5:47
9.	"Jesus to a Child"	Older	6:49
10.	"Older"	Older	5:32
11.	"Round Here"	Patience	5:55
12.	"You Have Been Loved"	Older	5:28
13.	"John and Elvis Are Dead"	Patience	4:24
14.	"This Is Not Real Love" (with Mutya)	New recording	4:54

For Loving – US edition
No.	Title	Original album	Length
11.	"The First Time Ever I Saw Your Face"	Songs from the Last Century	5:19

For Loving – Japanese bonus track
No.	Title	Original album	Length
15.	"Club Tropicana"	Fantastic	4:28

=== Disc 3: For the Loyal ===
For the Loyal – All deluxe editions
No.	Title	Source	Length
1.	"Understand"	New recording	5:55
2.	"Precious Box"	Patience	7:38
3.	"Roxanne"	Songs from the Last Century	4:10
4.	"Fantasy"	"Waiting for That Day" B-side	5:02
5.	"Cars and Trains"	Patience	5:51
6.	"Patience"	Patience	2:53
7.	"You Know That I Want To"	"Spinning the Wheel" B-side	4:32
8.	"My Mother Had a Brother"	Patience	6:19
9.	"If You Were There"	Make It Big	3:43
10.	"Safe"	"Spinning the Wheel" B-side	4:25
11.	"American Angel"	Patience	4:08
12.	"My Baby Just Cares for Me"	Songs from the Last Century	1:43
13.	"Brother, Can You Spare a Dime?" (live)	Pavarotti & Friends for Cambodia and Tibet	4:27
14.	"Please Send Me Someone (Anselmo's Song)"	Patience	5:25
15.	"Through"	Patience	4:54

=== 2010 Australian tour edition ===
Bonus disc
No.	Title	Original album	Length
1.	"Kissing a Fool"	Faith	4:34
2.	"Feeling Good"	New recording	2:54
3.	"My Baby Just Cares for Me"	Songs from the Last Century	1:46
4.	"Roxanne"	Songs from the Last Century	4:11
5.	"Club Tropicana"	Fantastic	4:29
6.	"I'm Your Man" (Extended Stimulation)	Non-Album Single	6:52

== Charts ==
=== Weekly charts ===
Chart (2006–2017)	Peak position
Australian Albums (ARIA)	9
Austrian Albums (Ö3 Austria)	19
Belgian Albums (Ultratop Flanders)	2
Belgian Albums (Ultratop Wallonia)	2
Canadian Albums (Billboard)	10
Croatian International Albums (HDU)	1
Czech Albums (ČNS IFPI)	11
Danish Albums (Hitlisten)	2
Dutch Albums (Album Top 100)	2
European Albums (Billboard)	1
Finnish Albums (Suomen virallinen lista)	39
French Albums (SNEP)	45
German Albums (Offizielle Top 100)	13
Greek Albums (IFPI)	1
Hungarian Albums (MAHASZ)	2
Irish Albums (IRMA)	3
Italian Albums (FIMI)	2
Japanese Albums (Oricon)	67
New Zealand Albums (RMNZ)	18
Norwegian Albums (VG-lista)	10
Polish Albums (ZPAV)	1
Portuguese Albums (AFP)	9
Scottish Albums (Official Charts)	1
Spanish Albums (Promusicae)	10
Swedish Albums (Sverigetopplistan)	3
Swiss Albums (Schweizer Hitparade)	2
UK Albums (Official Charts)	1
US Billboard 200	12

=== Year-end charts ===
Chart (2006)	Position
Belgian Albums (Ultratop Flanders)	48
Belgian Albums (Ultratop Wallonia)	33
Danish Albums (Hitlisten)	11
Dutch Albums (MegaCharts)	68
French Compilations (SNEP)	34
Hungarian Albums (MAHASZ)	34
Swiss Albums (Schweizer Hitparade)	74
UK Albums (OCC)	18

Chart (2007)	Position
Dutch Albums (MegaCharts)	91
Hungarian Albums (MAHASZ)	25
UK Albums (OCC)	145

Chart (2009)	Position
UK Albums (OCC)	199

Chart (2017)	Position
Polish Albums (ZPAV)	14
UK Albums (OCC)	28

Chart (2018)	Position
UK Albums (OCC)	75

Chart (2019)	Position
UK Albums (OCC)	59

Chart (2020)	Position
UK Albums (OCC)	50

Chart (2021)	Position
UK Albums (OCC)	53

Chart (2022)	Position
UK Albums (OCC)	48

Chart (2023)	Position
UK Albums (OCC)	56

Chart (2024)	Position
UK Albums (OCC)	38

Chart (2025)	Position
UK Albums (OCC)	43

== Certifications ==
Region	Certification	Certified units/sales
Australia (ARIA)	2× Platinum	140,000^{^}
Belgium (BRMA)	Gold	25,000^{*}
Denmark (IFPI Danmark)	5× Platinum	100,000^{‡}
France (SNEP)	Gold	75,000^{*}
Germany (BVMI)	Gold	100,000^{‡}
Greece (IFPI Greece)	Gold	7,500^{^}
Hungary (MAHASZ)	2× Platinum	12,000^{^}
Ireland (IRMA)	3× Platinum	45,000^{^}
Italy (FIMI)	Gold	25,000^{‡}
New Zealand (RMNZ)	Platinum	15,000^{‡}
Poland (ZPAV)	2× Platinum	40,000^{*}
Portugal (AFP)	Gold	10,000^{^}
Russia (NFPF)	Gold	10,000^{*}
Switzerland (IFPI Switzerland)	Gold	15,000^{^}
United Kingdom (BPI)	6× Platinum	1,800,000^{‡}
Summaries
Europe (IFPI)	Platinum	1,000,000^{*}
^{*} Sales figures based on certification alone.^{^} Shipments figures based on certification alone.^{‡} Sales+streaming figures based on certification alone.
