= George Michael Live in Australia =

2010 concert tour by George Michael

- Tour by George Michael
- Location: Australia
- Associated album: Twenty Five
- Start date: 20 February 2010
- End date: 3 March 2010
- No. of shows: 3
- Attendance: 100,000 – Melbourne (47,000), Sydney (45,000), Perth (15,000)

George Michael concert chronology
- 25 Live (2006–08); George Michael Live in Australia (2010); Symphonica Tour (2011–12)

George Michael Live in Australia was a concert tour by English singer-songwriter George Michael. For the first time since his Faith Tour in 1988, Michael returned to Australia in 2010 to perform three live concerts.

== Background ==
The tour was announced on 24 November 2009. Ticket sales for the tour were brisk, with the concerts at the 15,000 seat Burswood Dome in Perth and the 42,000 seat Sydney Football Stadium both being sellouts. The shows featured songs both from Michael's solo career and from his time in Wham!.

== Set list ==
1. "Waiting (Reprise)"
2. "Fastlove"
3. "I'm Your Man"
4. "Father Figure"
5. "Everything She Wants"
6. "One More Try"
7. "An Easier Affair"
8. "Too Funky"
  Break
9. "Faith"
10. "Spinning the Wheel"
11. "Feeling Good"
12. "Roxanne"
13. "Amazing"
14. "Flawless (Go to the City)"
15. "Outside"
  Encore
16. "Careless Whisper"
17. "Freedom! '90"

== Personnel ==
The band

- George Michael – vocals
- Chris Cameron – musical director, keyboards, arranger
- Lea Mullen – percussion
- Phil Palmer – guitars
- Andy Hamilton – sax, keyboards, EWI (Electronic Wind Instrument)
- Steve Walters – bass
- Mike Brown – guitars
- Carlos Hercules – drums
- Graham Kearns – guitars
- Luke Smith – keyboards
- Shirley Lewis – backing vocals
- Jay Henry – backing vocals
- Lincoln Jean-Marie – backing vocals
- Lori Perry – backing vocals
- Sharon Perry – backing vocals
- Lucy Jules – backing vocals

Management and production

- Michael Lippman – artist manager
- Andy Stephens – artist manager
- Ken Watts – tour director
- Lisa Johnson – assistant tour director
- Looloo Murphy – GM tour manager
- Sharon Ashley – band tour manager
- Ronnie Franklin – security consultant
- Mark Spring – production manager
- Di Eichorst – production coordinator
- Scott Chase – stage manager
- James Kelly – show manager
- Willie Williams – video staging designer and director
- Vince Foster – set and lighting design and operator
- Gary Bradshaw – front of house sound
- Andy Bramley – video director
- Barrie Marshall and Doris Dixon – agents

== Tour dates ==
List of concerts, showing date, city, country, venue, tickets sold, number of available tickets and amount of gross revenue
Date (2010)	City	Country	Venue	Attendance	Revenue
20 February	Perth	Australia	Burswood Dome	14,669 / 14,669	$2,281,790
26 February	Sydney	Australia	Sydney Football Stadium	42,342 / 42,390	$6,911,090
3 March	Melbourne	Australia	Etihad Stadium	45,402 / 45,971	$5,735,090
Total				102,413 / 103,030	$14,927,970
