= Motorcycle corset =

The motorcycle corset, also known as the motorcycle bustier, is a garment created by French fashion designer Thierry Mugler in 1992 as part of his Les Cowboys ready-to-wear collection. The piece is constructed primarily from plastic, metal, and Plexiglas, and incorporates literal motorcycle components, including rear-view mirrors and a headlight, into a wearable bodice. The motorcycle corset is considered one of the most widely recognised garments in late twentieth-century fashion history, and is held in the permanent collection of the Metropolitan Museum of Art.

== Background ==
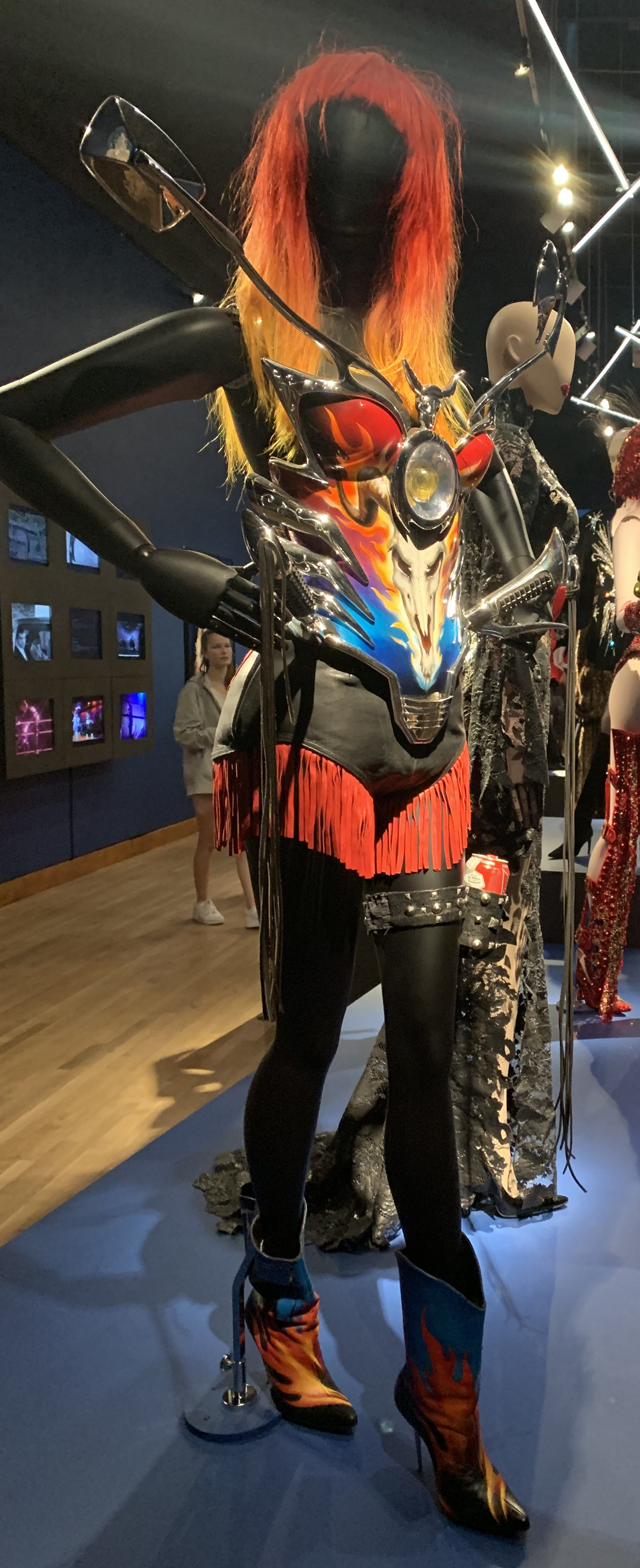
The corset at the Montreal Museum of Fine Arts in 2019

Thierry Mugler moved to Paris in 1970, establishing his own eponymous fashion house four years later. Mugler's spring/summer 1992 collection, titled Les Cowboys, was among his most celebrated, featuring models in leather, cowhide, and rubber. The collection included corseted biker jackets with fringe, thigh-high boots attached at the waist, and cowboy hats, with the motorcycle corset being the centrepiece of the collection.

The motorcycle corset was constructed using plastic, metal, and Plexiglas. The back features leather belts and metal buckles, securing the piece around the model's body, while the front incorporates a graphic flame design rendered in red, orange, and blue.

The corset has shiny silver plastic outlines the central graphic, while black leather tassels hang from the motorcycle "handlebars" at the front; prominent rear-view mirrors extend past the wearer's shoulders, and an unlit yellow light bulb at the top centre front represents the headlight of the deconstructed vehicle. The centre of the front panel is adorned with a ram's skull.

=== "Too Funky" music video (1992) ===
The motorcycle corset gained international recognition through its appearance in the music video for "Too Funky", a 1992 single by George Michael. Mugler directed the video himself, in which the garment was worn by Swedish model Emma Wiklund. The video, which Mugler conceived as a fashion show staged within a fictional television production, also featured models Linda Evangelista, Tyra Banks, Nadja Auermann, Estelle Hallyday, and Shana Zadrick, as well as actresses Julie Newmar and Rossy de Palma.

=== Acquisition by the Met and subsequent appearances ===
In 2001, the motorcycle corset was purchased by the Metropolitan Museum of Art in New York City, where it is held as part of the Anna Wintour Costume Center's collection. In 2008, the Costume Center featured the piece in its annual gala exhibition, titled Superheroes: Fashion and Fantasy, curated by Andrew Bolton. In the accompanying exhibition catalogue, Bolton wrote that "both Ghost Rider and the Punisher embodied the Iron Age's focus on death, a focus that finds resonance in the costumes of ... Thierry Mugler".

In 2015, the motorcycle corset was used in a cabaret show, the Mugler Follies, in Paris. The piece was subsequently included in the travelling retrospective exhibition Thierry Mugler: Couturissime, which opened at the Musée des Arts Décoratifs in Paris, France, in 2021, before being transferred to the Brooklyn Museum in New York City, where it opened in November 2022.

=== Association with Beyoncé ===
American singer Beyoncé first viewed the motorcycle corset when it was displayed in the Metropolitan Museum of Art's 2008 Superheroes: Fashion and Fantasy exhibition. She subsequently wore the original piece in a series of promotional photographs for her 2008 album I Am... Sasha Fierce, photographed in black and white by Peter Lindbergh.

Following the photoshoot, Beyoncé commissioned Mugler to design 58 new stage costumes for her I Am... tour and to serve as creative consultant for the production. Mugler told The Daily Telegraph that "I was very touched that she asked me, because she could have asked younger people. But she recognized that I was pretty much at the origin of this moment." The Fashion Institute of Design and Merchandising stated that Beyoncé's engagement with Mugler marked "his most visible collaboration" in the period following his retirement from runway fashion in 2000.

== Reception ==
Vogue praised the motorcycle corset in a 1992 review, writing that it was "probably destined for the museum". The BBC described the garment as "traffic-stopping", naming it one of Mugler's most famous designs. Elle lauded the corset as "undoubtedly one of [Mugler's] most iconic pieces", while Bustle described it as "his most memorable piece".
