= Songs from the Last Century =

Studio album by George Michael
- Released: 6 December 1999
- Recorded: 1999
- Studio: Right Track Recording (New York City)
- Length: 43:11
- Labels: Aegean; Virgin
- Producers: Phil Ramone; George Michael

George Michael chronology
Ladies & Gentlemen: The Best of George Michael (1998)	Songs from the Last Century (1999)	Patience (2004)

Professional ratings
Review scores
Source	Rating
AllMusic	3/5 stars
BBC	(mixed)
NME	1.5/5 stars
The Rolling Stone Album Guide	3/5 stars

Songs from the Last Century is the fourth solo studio album by English singer-songwriter George Michael, released on 6 December 1999 by Aegean Records and Virgin Records. Co-produced with Phil Ramone, it is Michael's only album consisting entirely of cover versions. It consists mainly of old jazz standards, along with new interpretations of more recent popular songs such as "Roxanne" by The Police and "Miss Sarajevo" by U2 and Brian Eno. Both were released as promotional singles.

== History ==
Songs from the Last Century is the only album in Michael's solo catalogue to not reach number one on the UK Albums Chart, peaking at number two on the chart dated 11 December 1999. It was kept from the top spot by Shania Twain's Come On Over.

Another version of the album's opening track, "Brother, Can You Spare a Dime?", features Michael and Italian tenor Luciano Pavarotti performing at the "Pavarotti and Friends for Cambodia and Tibet" live show on 6 June 2000. This version was included on the limited edition of Michael's 2006 greatest hits album, Twenty Five.

== Promotion ==
The cover photograph, depicting Michael in New York City, was taken in November 1999 and features the original World Trade Center in the background.

A promotional video for "Roxanne" was filmed in the Red District of Amsterdam, depicting the daily routines of real-life sex workers. At the end of the video, a woman named Franciska, who uses the alias "Roxanne", is shown leaving the profession.

== Track listing ==
No.	Title	Writer(s)	Original artist	Length
1.	"Brother, Can You Spare a Dime?"	E. Y. Harburg; Jay Gorney	Bing Crosby	4:22
2.	"Roxanne"	Sting	The Police	4:11
3.	"You've Changed"	Bill Carey; Carl Fischer	Harry James & His Orchestra	4:25
4.	"My Baby Just Cares for Me"	Gus Kahn; Walter Donaldson	Eddie Cantor	1:45
5.	"The First Time Ever I Saw Your Face"	Ewan MacColl	Roberta Flack	5:19
6.	"Miss Sarajevo"	Adam Clayton; Brian Eno; Dave Evans; Larry Mullen; Paul Hewson	Passengers (U2 and Brian Eno)	5:11
7.	"I Remember You"	Johnny Mercer; Victor Schertzinger	Jimmy Dorsey	4:12
8.	"Secret Love"	Paul Francis Webster; Sammy Fain	Doris Day	2:39
9.	"Wild Is the Wind"	Dimitri Tiomkin; Ned Washington	Johnny Mathis	4:02
10.	"Where or When / It's All Right with Me" (instrumental) (hidden track)	Richard Rodgers; Lorenz Hart; ("Where or When"); Cole Porter ("It's All Right with Me")	Dion and the Belmonts ("Where or When"); Peter Cookson ("It's All Right with Me")	7:00
Total length:				43:11

== Personnel ==
Credits adapted from AllMusic.

- Abe Appleman – violin
- Diane Barere – cello
- Elena Barere – concert master, violin
- Herb Besson – trombone
- Yuri Vodovoz – violin
- Virgil Blackwell – clarinet
- Arvil Brown – violin
- Jacqui Danilow – bass guitar
- Marji Danilow – bass guitar
- Lawrence Feldman – woodwind
- Frank Filipetti – engineer, mixing
- David Finck – bass guitar
- Barry Finclair – concert master, violin
- Crystal Garner – viola
- Maura Giannini – violin
- Karen Griffen – flute
- Juliet Haffner – viola
- Corky Hale – harp
- Laura Hamilton – violin
- Joyce Hammann – violin
- Sheryl Henze – flute
- Kenneth Hitchcock – woodwind
- Jim Hynes – trumpet
- Regis Iandiorio – violin
- Jean Ingraham – violin
- Greg Jakobek – design
- Ted Jensen – mastering
- Tony Kadleck – trumpet
- Jeff Kievit – trumpet
- Chris Komer – French horn
- Carol Landon – viola
- Jeff Lang – French horn
- Kim Laskowski – bassoon
- Ann Leathers – violin
- Jeanne LeBlanc – cello
- Nancy McAlhany – violin
- Diane Lesser – oboe
- Richard Locker – cello
- Dave Mann – woodwind
- Rob Mathes – arranger, conductor, piano
- Andrew McPherson – photography
- George Michael – design, liner notes, primary artist, producer
- Jeff Mironov – guitar
- John Moses – clarinet
- Rob Mounsey – arranger, conductor, piano
- Nick Murdoch – piano
- Jan Mullen – violin
- Lewis Nash – drums
- Danny Cummings – percussion
- Phil Palmer – guitar
- Laura Oatts – violin
- Caryl Paisner – cello
- Scott Parker – assistant engineer
- Shawn Pelton – drums
- Steve Walters – bass guitar
- Charles Pillow – woodwind
- Sue Pray – viola
- Phil Ramone – liner notes, producer
- Tim Ries – woodwind
- Marcus Rojas – tuba
- Roger Rosenberg – woodwind
- Stacey Shames – harp
- Mark Orrin Shuman – cello
- Pamela Sklar – flute
- Andy Snitzer – woodwind
- Jason Stasium – mixing
- Byron Stripling – trumpet
- Marti Sweet – violin
- Donna Tecco – violin
- David Tofani – woodwind
- Carol Webb – violin
- Ellen Westermann – cello
- Torrie Zito – arranger

== Charts ==
=== Weekly charts ===
Chart (1999–2000)	Peak position
Australian Albums (ARIA)	12
Austrian Albums (Ö3 Austria)	12
Belgian Albums (Ultratop Flanders)	11
Belgian Albums (Ultratop Wallonia)	4
Canada Top Albums/CDs (RPM)	33
Danish Albums (Hitlisten)	5
Dutch Albums (Album Top 100)	6
European Albums (Top 100)	2
French Albums (SNEP)	7
German Albums (Offizielle Top 100)	4
Hungarian Albums (MAHASZ)	5
Irish Albums (IRMA)	7
Italian Albums (FIMI)	4
Japanese Albums (Oricon)	59
New Zealand Albums (RMNZ)	8
Norwegian Albums (VG-lista)	13
Scottish Albums (Official Charts)	8
Spanish Albums (PROMUSICAE)	11
Swedish Albums (Sverigetopplistan)	16
Swiss Albums (Schweizer Hitparade)	6
UK Albums (Official Charts)	2
US Billboard 200	157

=== Year-end charts ===
Chart (1999)	Position
Australian Albums (ARIA)	74
UK Albums (OCC)	18

Chart (2000)	Position
Belgian Albums (Ultratop Flanders)	93
Belgian Albums (Ultratop Wallonia)	39
Danish Albums (Hitlisten)	86
Dutch Albums (MegaCharts)	87
European Albums (Music & Media)	33
German Albums (Offizielle Top 100)	64
UK Albums (OCC)	98

== Certifications and sales ==
Region	Certification	Certified units/sales
Australia (ARIA)	Gold	35,000^{^}
Belgium (BRMA)	Platinum	50,000^{*}
Canada (Music Canada)	Gold	50,000^{^}
France (SNEP)	2× Gold	200,000^{*}
Germany (BVMI)	Gold	150,000^{^}
New Zealand (RMNZ)	Platinum	15,000^{^}
Spain (Promusicae)	Platinum	100,000^{^}
Switzerland (IFPI Switzerland)	Gold	25,000^{^}
United Kingdom (BPI)	2× Platinum	600,000
United States	—	152,000
Summaries
Europe (IFPI)	2× Platinum	2,000,000^{*}
Worldwide	—	3,600,000
^{*} Sales figures based on certification alone.^{^} Shipments figures based on certification alone.
