= An Easier Affair =

2006 single by George Michael

Single by George Michael

from the album Twenty Five
- Released: 3 July 2006
- Length: 4:37
- Label: Sony BMG; Aegean
- Songwriters: George Michael; Ruadhri Cushnan; Kevin Ambrose; Niall Flynn
- Producer: George Michael

George Michael singles chronology
"John and Elvis Are Dead" (2005)	"An Easier Affair" (2006)	"This Is Not Real Love" (2006)

Music video
- "An Easier Affair" on YouTube

"An Easier Affair" is a song by English singer-songwriter George Michael, released as the first single from his second greatest hits album, Twenty Five. The song was released on 3 July 2006 and peaked at number one in Italy and Hungary, selling 10,000 units in Italy. In the United Kingdom, it reached number 13. The music video was directed by Jake Nava.

== Track listing ==
CD single and digital single

1. "An Easier Affair" – 4:36
2. "Brother, Can You Spare a Dime?" (performed at "Pavarotti and Friends") – 4:27

== Charts ==
=== Weekly charts ===
Chart (2006)	Peak position
Australia (ARIA)	36
Austria (Ö3 Austria Top 40)	58
Belgium (Ultratip Bubbling Under Flanders)	2
Belgium (Ultratip Bubbling Under Wallonia)	2
Denmark (Tracklisten)	6
Europe (European Hot 100 Singles)	14
France (SNEP)	87
Germany (GfK)	44
Greece (IFPI)	11
Hungary (Single Top 40)	1
Hungary (Rádiós Top 40)	30
Ireland (IRMA)	20
Italy (FIMI)	1
Netherlands (Dutch Top 40 Tipparade)	5
Netherlands (Single Top 100)	37
Scotland Singles (OCC)	10
Sweden (Sverigetopplistan)	23
Switzerland (Schweizer Hitparade)	28
UK Singles (OCC)	13

=== Year-end charts ===
Chart (2006)	Position
Italy (FIMI)	14

== See also ==
- List of number-one hits of 2006 (Italy)
