= Too Funky =

1992 single by George Michael

Single by George Michael

from the album Red Hot + Dance
- B-side: "Crazy Man Dance"; "Too Jazzy" (Happy mix)
- Released: 1 June 1992
- Genre: Dance-pop
- Length: 5:37 (album version); 3:45 (single edit); 3:58 (video edit)
- Label: Epic
- Songwriter: George Michael
- Producer: George Michael

George Michael singles chronology
"Don't Let the Sun Go Down on Me" (1991)	"Too Funky" (1992)	"Somebody to Love" (1993)

Music video
- "Too Funky" on YouTube

"Too Funky" is a song written and performed by English singer and songwriter George Michael and released by Columbia Records in the United States and Epic Records elsewhere in 1992. The song was Michael's final single for his recording contract with Sony Music before he started legal action to extricate himself from it. "Too Funky" had been initially earmarked for a follow-up to the album Listen Without Prejudice Vol. 1, but Michael shelved the idea, instead donating it, along with two other songs, to the project Red Hot + Dance (1992), which raised money for AIDS awareness. Michael subsequently donated the royalties to the same cause.

"Too Funky" was another chart hit for Michael, reaching number one in Denmark and entering the top 10 in 17 other countries, including Australia, France, the United Kingdom, and the United States. The accompanying music video was directed by him with Thierry Mugler and featured supermodels on the catwalk at a fictitious runway show. The song never appeared on any of Michael's studio albums, although later it was included on his first solo collection, Ladies & Gentlemen: The Best of George Michael (1998), and in the 2017 reissue of Listen Without Prejudice Vol. 1, which also included the two other songs from Red Hot + Dance and its B-side "Crazy Man Dance", all of which were recorded for the aborted follow-up of the 1990 album.

== Composition ==
Lyrically, "Too Funky" is a basic, animalistic plea for sexual activity. An Anne Bancroft line from the 1967 film The Graduate ("I am not trying to seduce you... Would you like me to seduce you? Is that what you're trying to tell me?") appears in the intro of the song and is repeated during the final crescendo. The song then ends with a sample from an episode of the Tony Hancock sitcom Hancock called "The Radio Ham", spoken by actress Annie Leake ("Would you stop playing with that radio of yours? I'm trying to get to sleep"). The song is based on a drum beat from the Brand New Heavies' 1991 single "Never Stop", while its synth hook quotes the hook from Jocelyn Brown's 1984 hit "Somebody Else's Guy".

== Critical reception ==
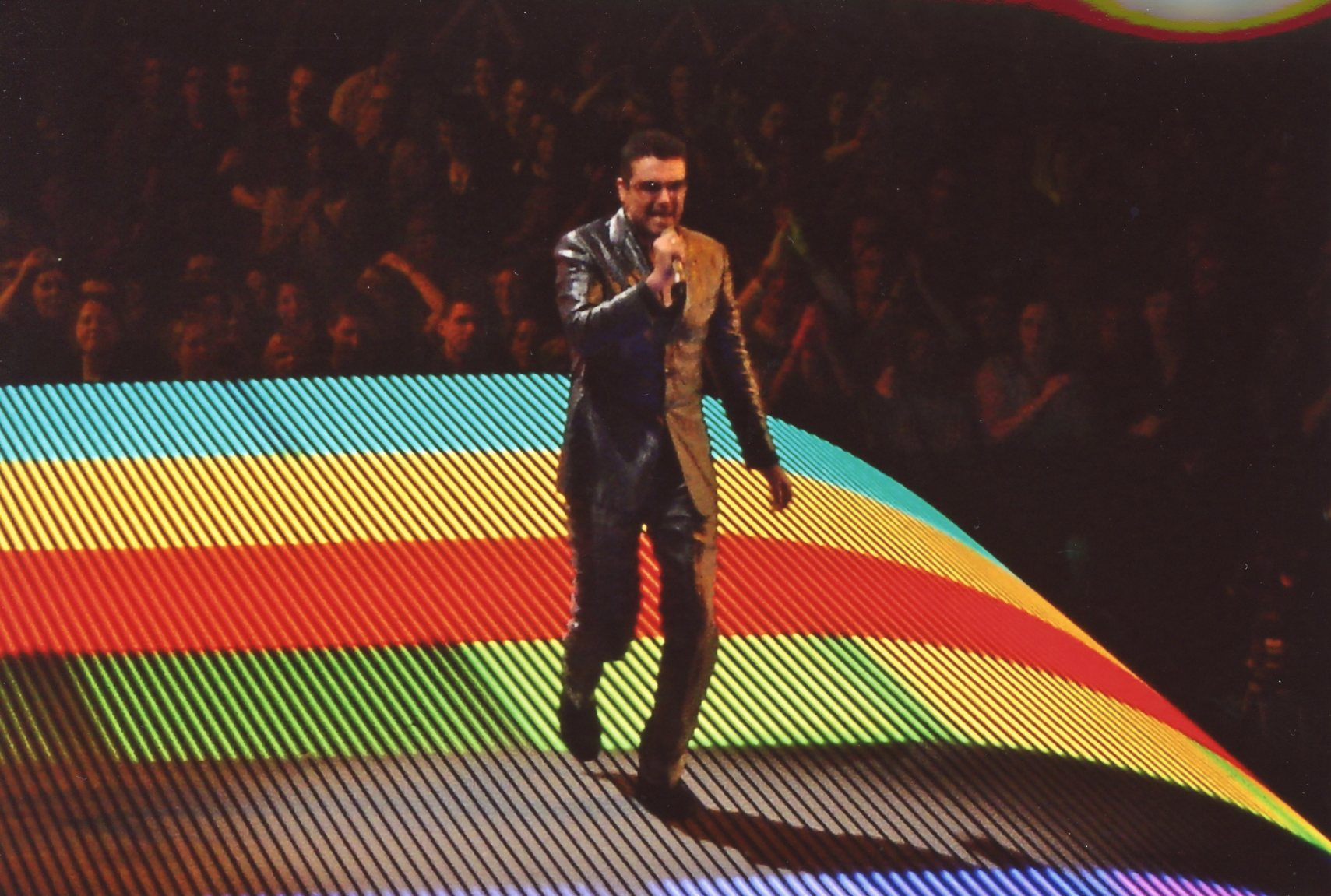
Michael performing "Too Funky" at Wembley Arena during the 25 Live tour in 2006

Scottish Aberdeen Press and Journal commented, "George obviously having a go at trying to get into the dance scene with this too-funky number which rings of Bobby Brown and Michael Jackson." Larry Flick from Billboard magazine felt the singer "works up an impressive sweat amid a swirling array of funk-driven guitars and keyboards, adding, "This bears all the marks of a well-deserved multiformat smash." A reviewer from Cash Box declared the song as a "simple, funky dance send-up". Amy Linden from Entertainment Weekly called it a "slinky, disco-fever-redux hit". Irish Evening Herald found that the "steamy" single is about a "big build-up to a seduction", "but it's got a depressing end. Some things never change, but we can definitely tell you that although George's hair is shorter these days, he's still got the same beard." Dave Sholin from the Gavin Report stated that Michael "delivers just the type of sound a lot of longtime fans were hoping for. He rides this groove with a sexy undercurrent reinforced by sampling the voice of Anne Bancroft seducing Dustin Hoffman in The Graduate.

Dennis Hunt from the Los Angeles Times viewed it as a "sizzling" new dance track, stating that "Too Funky" "ranks with his best and is an indication that he should focus on dance music". The Stud Brothers of Melody Maker said it's "George doing a rumbustuous Karaoke Prince, the extravagant minimalist backing coming courtesy of many of the world's highest-paid session musicians. Which is all weirdly endearing." Pan-European magazine Music & Media described it as a "funky and catchy number, underpinned by a persistent keyboard pattern". Alan Jones from Music Week named it Pick of the Week, writing, "Released 10 years to the week after George made his recording debut with the instantly successful 'Wham Rap', it's a muscular, mid-tempo urban dance contender bass-based with some nice piano fills. George groupies, dance fans and casual record buyers alike will warm to it, with obvious chart results." David Quantick from New Musical Express called it "a plonking, KC and the Sunshine Band pastiche with a few hooks but nothing else". Victoria Segal from NME said, "A consummate narcissist—"I'd love to see you naked, baby... maybe tonight, if that's alright", he intones coolly on the staccato seduction of 'Too Funky'." Bunny Sawyer from Smash Hits gave the song a score of four out of five, praising it as "a fab stomp-along beat...a triumphant return to form".

== Commercial performance ==
"Too Funky" reached number four on the UK Singles Chart in 1992. As of October 2017, the single had sold 168,000 copies in the UK. In the US, it reached number 10 on both the Billboard Hot 100 and the US Cash Box Top 100. It sold more than 500,000 copies, being certified gold by the Recording Industry Association of America (RIAA). In Australia, "Too Funky" became the biggest gainer song ever in the top 50 of the Australian ARIA Singles Chart when it jumped from number 50 to number eight (42 places), before reaching its peak position at number three. "Too Funky" held this record until 2009, when "3" by Britney Spears rose from number 50 to number seven (43 places). In Canada, "Too Funky" peaked at number six on the RPM 100 Hit Tracks chart.

== Music video ==
Fashion designer Thierry Mugler and Michael directed the music video for "Too Funky". Mugler designed and created the costumes – including his motorcycle corset – for the models in the song's accompanying music video, which shows Michael in one- to three-second appearances as a director filming a number of supermodels on the catwalk at a fictitious runway show, a concept similar to the one he used in the video for his 1990 single "Freedom! '90". The models who appeared in the video are Eva Herzigova, Linda Evangelista, Nadja Auermann, Emma Sjöberg, Estelle Hallyday, Shana Zadrick, Tyra Banks, Beverly Peele and Connie Fleming, also known as Connie Girl. Actresses Julie Newmar and Rossy de Palma, and the performance artists/drag queens Joey Arias and Lypsinka are also shown. A "making of" video was also created.

The video's concept was written by Jeff Beasley after attending a benefit fashion show held by Mugler several months before in Los Angeles. Beasley worked at Propaganda Films, the production company where David Fincher directed "Freedom! '90"—the supermodel video on which "Too Funky" is based. Originally the same models from Fincher's video were going to be used, namely Evangelista, Naomi Campbell, Christy Turlington, Cindy Crawford, and Tatjana Patitz. Mugler decided, however, that he wanted new models and only kept Evangelista for the project. The video was produced by Beasley and filmed by Mike Southon. A rare "alternate edit" of the video includes several male models, including eventual Grey's Anatomy star Justin Chambers and Oscar-nominated actor Djimon Hounsou, who was discovered by Mugler in Paris, and sometimes can be found online.

== Impact and legacy ==
In 2012, Porcys listed the song at number 62 in their ranking of "100 Singles 1990–1999". In 2017, BuzzFeed ranked "Too Funky" number 60 in their list of "The 101 Greatest Dance Songs of the '90s". In 2020, Slant Magazine placed it at number 55 in their list of "The 100 Best Dance Songs of All Time".

== Track listings ==
- UK 7-inch and cassette single
- European CD single
- Australian cassette single
1. "Too Funky" – 3:45
2. "Crazy Man Dance" – 5:05
- UK 12-inch single

A. "Too Funky" (extended) – 5:36
B. "Crazy Man Dance" – 5:05

- UK and Australian CD single
- Japanese mini-CD single
1. "Too Funky" – 3:45
2. "Crazy Man Dance" – 5:05
3. "Too Funky" (extended) – 5:36
- European 12-inch and maxi-CD single
1. "Too Funky" (extended) – 5:36
2. "Too Jazzy" (Happy mix) – 5:52
3. "Too Funky" (Digital mix) – 6:24
- US 7-inch and cassette single
1. "Too Funky" – 3:45
2. "Crazy Man Dance" – 5:52
- US 12-inch and maxi-cassette single

A1. "Too Funky" (extended) – 5:37
A2. "Too Funky" (Digital mix) – 6:25
B1. "Too Jazzy" (Happy mix) – 5:53
B2. "Crazy Man Dance" – 5:52

- US maxi-CD single
1. "Too Funky" (extended) – 5:37
2. "Too Funky" (Digital mix) – 6:45
3. "Too Jazzy" (Happy mix) – 5:45
4. "Too Funky" (single version) – 3:45
5. "Crazy Man Dance" – 5:52

== Charts ==
=== Weekly charts ===
Chart (1992–1993)	Peak position
Australia (ARIA)	3
Austria (Ö3 Austria Top 40)	9
Belgium (Ultratop 50 Flanders)	2
Canada Top Singles (RPM)	6
Canada Adult Contemporary (RPM)	25
Canada Dance/Urban (RPM)	1
Denmark (IFPI)	1
Europe (Eurochart Hot 100)	3
Europe (European Dance Radio)	2
Europe (European Hit Radio)	1
Finland (Suomen virallinen lista)	4
France (SNEP)	5
Germany (GfK)	12
Greece (Virgin)	2
Ireland (IRMA)	5
Israel (Israeli Singles Chart)	2
Italy (Musica e dischi)	2
Japan (Oricon)	95
Netherlands (Dutch Top 40)	3
Netherlands (Single Top 100)	3
New Zealand (Recorded Music NZ)	5
Norway (VG-lista)	2
Portugal (AFP)	4
Sweden (Sverigetopplistan)	7
Switzerland (Schweizer Hitparade)	6
UK Singles (Official Charts)	4
UK Airplay (Music Week)	1
UK Dance (Music Week)	31
US Billboard Hot 100	10
US Dance Club Songs (Billboard)	20
US Dance Singles Sales (Billboard)	11
US Cash Box Top 100	10

=== Year-end charts ===
Chart (1992)	Position
Australia (ARIA)	19
Belgium (Ultratop)	22
Canada Top Singles (RPM)	48
Canada Dance/Urban (RPM)	7
Europe (Eurochart Hot 100)	19
Europe (European Dance Radio)	8
Europe (European Hit Radio)	1
Germany (Media Control)	80
Israel (Israeli Singles Chart)	49
Netherlands (Dutch Top 40)	58
Netherlands (Single Top 100)	66
Sweden (Topplistan)	34
Switzerland (Schweizer Hitparade)	26
UK Singles (OCC)	52
UK Airplay (Music Week)	12
US Billboard Hot 100	58

== Certifications and sales ==
Region	Certification	Certified units/sales
Australia (ARIA)	Platinum	70,000^{‡}
United Kingdom	—	168,000
United States (RIAA)	Gold	500,000^{‡}
^{‡} Sales+streaming figures based on certification alone.

== Release history ==
Region	Date	Format(s)	Label(s)	Ref.
United Kingdom	1 June 1992	7-inch vinyl; 12-inch vinyl; CD; cassette	Epic	
Australia	8 June 1992	CD; cassette	Epic	
Japan	16 July 1992	Mini-CD	Epic	
