= White Light (George Michael song) =

Single by George Michael
- B-side: "Song to the Siren"
- Released: 29 June 2012
- Recorded: April 2012
- Genre: Dance-pop; electropop; trance
- Length: 4:36
- Label: Aegean; Island
- Songwriter: George Michael
- Producer: George Michael

George Michael singles chronology
"True Faith" (2011)	"White Light" (2012)	"Let Her Down Easy" (2014)

Music video
- "White Light" on YouTube

"White Light" is a song by English singer-songwriter George Michael. The song premiered on George Michael's official YouTube channel on 29 June 2012, before being released to radio on 2 July 2012, in order to commemorate the 30-year anniversary since his first single (co-written by Andrew Ridgeley) entered the British charts in 1982. The song received its debut live performance (alongside "Freedom! '90") at the 2012 Summer Olympics closing ceremony on 12 August 2012 and subsequently entered the UK Singles Chart at number 15. This was his final original song released before his death in December 2016.

== Chart performance ==
On 19 August 2012, the song entered the UK Singles Chart at number 15, becoming his last top 40 hit prior to his death on 25 December 2016. The song has also charted in Belgium, Germany, the Netherlands, and Switzerland.

== Track listing ==
=== "White Light" (EP) ===
1. "White Light" – 4:35
2. "Song to the Siren" – 3:33
3. "White Light" (Voodoo Sonics Remix) – 6:58
4. "White Light" (Kinky Roland Remix) – 6:47

=== "White Light" (The Remixes) ===
1. "White Light" (Kinky Roland Remix) – 6:47
2. "White Light" (Steven Redant & Phil Romano Divine Vox Remix) – 7:12
3. "White Light" (Stereogamous Bath House Mix) – 5:05
4. "White Light" (Voodoo Sonics Remix) – 6:58
5. "White Light" (Jackman & Thomas Remix) – 6:08
6. "White Light" (David Kay Remix) – 4:01

== Charts ==
Chart (2012)	Peak position
Australia (ARIA)	88
Austria (Ö3 Austria Top 40)	53
Belgium (Ultratop 50 Flanders)	50
Belgium (Ultratip Bubbling Under Wallonia)	32
Belgium (Dance Bubbling Under Wallonia)	17
France (SNEP)	73
Germany (GfK)	21
Hungary (Single Top 40)	3
Ireland (IRMA)	32
Italy (FIMI)	17
Netherlands (Single Top 100)	6
Scottish Singles Sales (Official Charts)	29
Spain (Promusicae)	35
Switzerland (Schweizer Hitparade)	34
UK Singles (Official Charts)	15

== Certifications ==
Region	Certification	Certified units/sales
Italy (FIMI)	Gold	15,000^{*}
^{*} Sales figures based on certification alone.
