= Lincoln Jean-Marie =

British singer (born 1976)

- Born: Lincoln Jean-Marie; 27 December 1976 (age 49)
- Origin: London, England
- Genres: Christian music, soul, R&B, jazz
- Years active: 1994–present
- Labels: Warner Bros. (c. 1995–1997)
- Website: lincolnjeanmarie.com

Lincoln Jean-Marie is a British singer, born in London, England.

Jean-Marie has over fifteen years of working experience as a singer, songwriter, and arranger of both lead and backing vocals. He was also a member of the four-piece a cappella group Peace by Piece who were signed to Warner Bros., released two UK singles and won Best Newcomers at the MOBO Awards. Lincoln Jean-Marie is the father of songwriter/producer Tre Jean-Marie.

== Television, stage and tour work ==
- London 2012 Olympics – sang as part of George Michael's band at the closing ceremony
- Queen's Jubilee 2012 – sang backing vocals as part of the house band on stage
- George Michael – backing singer as part of the band, touring the UK, Europe and the US
- Craig David – backing singer as part of the band, touring the UK, Europe and the US
- Pet Shop Boys – sang backing vocals for the Pet Shop Boys on BBC 1's Top of the Pops
- The Fresh Prince of Bel-Air – sang with a cappella group for studio audience
- Radio 1 Roadshow (Ireland) – sang lead vocals
- Lemar – backing singer as part of the band, touring the UK and Europe
- Robbie Williams – backing singer as part of the band at German launch of World Tour
