= Praying for Time =

1990 single by George Michael

Single by George Michael

from the album Listen Without Prejudice Vol. 1
- B-side: "If You Were My Woman" (live at Wembley Stadium, 11 Jun '88); "Waiting" (reprise)
- Written: October 1989
- Released: 13 August 1990
- Genre: Pop
- Length: 4:41
- Label: Epic; Columbia
- Songwriter: George Michael
- Producer: George Michael

George Michael singles chronology
"Kissing a Fool" (1988)	"Praying for Time" (1990)	"Waiting for That Day" (1990)

Music video
- "Praying for Time" on YouTube

"Praying for Time" is a song written, produced, and performed by English singer and songwriter George Michael, released on Epic Records in the United Kingdom and Columbia Records in the United States in 1990. It was the first single from his second studio album, Listen Without Prejudice Vol. 1 (1990), spending one week at number one on the US Billboard Hot 100, making it Michael's seventh number one in the US and his last solo single to top the chart. "Praying for Time" also reached number one in Canada, becoming Michael's penultimate number-one solo hit there. Its accompanying music video, directed by Michael Borofsky, didn't feature Michael as it only featured the lyrics of the song.

== Release ==
"Praying for Time" was Michael's first single in almost two years, entering the UK Singles Chart in August 1990. A dark and sombre reflection on social ills and injustice, it was hailed by many critics. It was the first song of political motivation he had released as a single since his earliest days with Wham!.

The song was the first of five released in the UK from the album Listen Without Prejudice Vol. 1, although it was the only one of the quintet to make the UK top 10, peaking at number six. As of October 2017, the single sold 140,000 copies in UK.

== Critical reception ==
In a retrospective review, Matthew Hocter from Albumism wrote that the song, "which examines the many social injustices faced by so many, questions the listener into the conditioning that society has created and why it can be so hard to be kind to one another." He added, "Timeless and still so relevant in this day and age." Stephen Thomas Erlewine from AllMusic picked it as a "highlight" from the album. Upon the release, Bill Coleman from Billboard magazine noted, "Previewing the long-awaited Listen Without Prejudice Vol. 1 album is a dramatic, socially conscious ballad, delivered with the kind of unabashed soul and bravado we've come to expect (and love) from Michael. The countdown to No. 1 starts now ..." In a 2008 review, The Daily Vault's Melanie Love said that "Praying for Time" "features Michael singing in a lower range to more formally distance himself from the realm of sunny pop, his tone oddly soothing". She added, "It's the expressiveness of his voice that makes this track such a potent opener, switching seamlessly from scathing to aching to helpless on this rumination on social injustices." Chris Roberts from Melody Maker named it Single of the Week, adding that it "marks George entering his loony eccentric British recluse genius phase and displays a staggering excess of ambition."

Pan-European magazine Music & Media stated, "A well-crafted, lovely ballad building up to sizeable proportions. The transparent production gives ample space to Michael's passionate vocals." David Giles from Music Week described it as a "glorious ballad that ranks alongside 'Careless Whisper' and 'A Different Corner' as one of the best things he's ever written." He added, "This has distinct shades of Lennon circa 1975". Victoria Segal from NME called it a "splendidly melodramatic breath of apocalypse". A reviewer from People magazine commented, "Set to a somber Lennonesque arrangement (unfortunately, that’s Julian, not John), the song murkily bemoans our troubled, faithless times." The reviewer also complimented Michael's "talents for writing, singing, arranging and producing". James Hunter of Rolling Stone described the song as "a distraught look at the world's astounding woundedness. Michael offers the healing passage of time as the only balm for physical and emotional hunger, poverty, hypocrisy and hatred."

During the Symphonica Tour in 2011–12, Michael performed the song with slightly different lyrics:

I sang 20 years and a day
But nothing changed
The human race found some other god
And walked into the flame

== Music video ==
While Michael refused to appear in videos to support the album, an experimental video clip directed by Michael Borofsky was released for "Praying for Time", featuring only the lyrics of the song with a blue and black background that, at the end of the clip, reveals itself to be the image on the cover of the album. Some of the written lyrics featured in the video are slightly animated:

- The lines "The rich declare themselves poor", and "And the wounded skies above" have a shimmering quality, as if written on water.
- The lines "I guess somewhere along the way", "he must have let us out to play", and, at the start of the second verse, "These are the days of the empty hand", unroll themselves on the screen, as if written on a ribbon.
- The single words forming the line "'cause God's stopped keeping score" appear on screen one at a time, in sync with the vocals, on both occurrences of that line.
- In the second chorus, the words "love", "hate" and "hope", respectively at the end of the lines "It's hard to love", "There's so much to hate" and "Hanging on to hope", are all left literally hanging on the screen, fading out a few instants later after the other words in the respective lines have faded out.
- The two occurrences of the line "when there is no hope to speak of", one in each chorus, feature different treatments of the word "hope". In the first chorus, the line appears without the word "hope", which flashes briefly on screen when it is sung; in the second chorus, the word does not appear at all and the line is shown with a gap (i.e. "when there is no ____ to speak of"). Similarly, in the line "This is the year of the guilty man", the word "guilty" flashes on screen only when it is actually sung.

The video quickly became a buzz clip on MTV, and stayed in rotation on most video networks for weeks. Similarly, the commercial single had no cover photo, only words. Some have speculated that the style of the video was influenced by Prince's similar promo clip for "Sign o' the Times" released three years previously.

After Michael's temporary move to Virgin in 1996, Sony Music re-made the video in a simplified CGI version, with a uniform black/grey background and no animations at all. This is the one most commonly available as of 2017, and as such it was released in the 2017 Deluxe Edition of the Listen Without Prejudice Vol. 1 album.

An alternate music video for this song has also been released, with Michael actually seen recording and performing the lyrics.

== Track listings ==
All tracks are written by George Michael, except where noted.

7-inch: Epic / GEO 1 (UK)
No.	Title	Writer(s)	Length
1.	"Praying for Time"		4:40
2.	"If You Were My Woman" (live at Wembley Stadium, 11 Jun '88)	Pam Sawyer; Clay McMurray; LaVerne Ware	4:05

Also available on MC (Epic / GEO M1), 12-inch (Epic / GEO T1) and CD (Epic / CD GEO 1)

CD: Epic / GEO C1 (UK, limited edition)
No.	Title	Writer(s)	Length
1.	"Praying for Time"		4:40
2.	"If You Were My Woman" (live at Wembley Stadium, 11 Jun '88)	Sawyer; McMurray; Ware	4:05
3.	"Waiting" (reprise)		2:25

== Personnel ==
Personnel taken from Listen Without Prejudice Vol. 1 liner notes.

- George Michael – vocals, keyboards
- Deon Estus – bass
- Phil Palmer – guitars

== Charts ==
=== Weekly charts ===
Weekly chart performance for "Praying for Time"
Chart (1990)	Peak position
Australia (ARIA)	16
Austria (Ö3 Austria Top 40)	20
Belgium (Ultratop 50 Flanders)	4
Canada Retail Singles (The Record)	1
Canada Top Singles (RPM)	1
Canada Adult Contemporary (RPM)	1
Europe (Eurochart Hot 100)	13
Finland (Suomen virallinen lista)	13
France (SNEP)	19
Germany (GfK)	19
Greece (IFPI)	3
Ireland (IRMA)	3
Italy (Musica e dischi)	2
Japan (Oricon)	89
Luxembourg (Radio Luxembourg)	4
Netherlands (Dutch Top 40)	10
Netherlands (Single Top 100)	11
New Zealand (Recorded Music NZ)	8
Norway (VG-lista)	2
Portugal (AFP)	2
Sweden (Sverigetopplistan)	9
Switzerland (Schweizer Hitparade)	6
UK Singles (Official Charts)	6
US Billboard Hot 100	1
US Adult Contemporary (Billboard)	4
US Cash Box Top 100	1
US Contemporary Hit Radio (Radio & Records)	1

=== Year-end charts ===
Year-end chart performance for "Praying for Time"
Chart (1990)	Position
Australia (ARIA)	95
Belgium (Ultratop)	49
Canada Top Singles (RPM)	18
Canada Adult Contemporary (RPM)	23
Europe (Eurochart Hot 100)	65
Netherlands (Dutch Top 40)	82
Netherlands (Single Top 100)	69
Sweden (Topplistan)	52
US Billboard Hot 100	51
US Cash Box Top 100	7

Chart (1991)	Position
Italy (Musica e dischi)	82

=== Decade-end charts ===
Decade-end chart performance for "Praying for Time"
Chart (1990–1999)	Position
Canada (Nielsen SoundScan)	98

== Certifications ==
Certifications and sales for "Praying for Time"
Region	Certification	Certified units/sales
United Kingdom (BPI)	Silver	200,000^{‡}
^{‡} Sales+streaming figures based on certification alone.

== Release history ==
Release history and formats for "Praying for Time"
Region	Date	Format(s)	Label(s)	Ref.
Australia	13 August 1990	7-inch vinyl; 12-inch vinyl; CD; cassette	Epic	
United Kingdom	13 August 1990	7-inch vinyl; 12-inch vinyl; CD	Epic	
Japan	30 August 1990	Mini-CD	Epic	
United Kingdom	3 September 1990	Cassette	Epic	

== American Idol ==
"Praying for Time"

Single by Carrie Underwood
- Released: 9 April 2008
- Recorded: 9 April 2008
- Venue: Kodak Theatre, Hollywood, California
- Genre: Country pop; gospel
- Length: 3:31
- Label: Arista Nashville
- Songwriter: George Michael

Carrie Underwood singles chronology
"Last Name" (2008)	"Praying for Time" (2008)	"Just a Dream" (2008)

The song was performed by Carrie Underwood for the 2008 Idol Gives Back mini-marathon on 9 April 2008. In a matter of 24 hours, Underwood's rendition of "Praying for Time" reached number 10 on the Hot Digital Songs chart, with all proceeds being donated to charity. It also peaked at number 27 on the US Billboard Hot 100 on the week of 26 April 2008. George Michael performed the song during the 2008 American Idol finale on 21 May 2008.

== See also ==
- List of European number-one airplay songs of the 1990s
