= Jesus to a Child =

1996 single by George Michael

Single by George Michael

from the album Older
- B-side: "One More Try" (live); "Older" (instrumental)
- Released: 8 January 1996
- Genre: Bossa nova; pop
- Length: 6:51 (album version); 6:04 (radio edit); 4:35 (video version); 4:15 (special radio edit)
- Label: Virgin
- Songwriter: George Michael
- Producer: George Michael

George Michael singles chronology
"Killer" / "Papa Was a Rollin' Stone" (1993)	"Jesus to a Child" (1996)	"Fastlove" (1996)

Music video
- "Jesus to a Child" on YouTube

"Jesus to a Child" is a song by English singer and songwriter George Michael. Written as a melancholic tribute to his late lover Anselmo Feleppa, it was released in January 1996 by Virgin Records as the first single from his third studio album, Older (1996). The song, both written and produced by Michael, received positive reviews from music critics, many praising it as one of the best songs of the album; both The Guardian and Music Week named it Single of the Week. It peaked at number one in Australia, Finland, Hungary, Ireland, Israel, Norway, Spain and the United Kingdom; it was Michael's sixth UK number one and his third as a solo performer. It also reached the top three on several other European charts and peaked at number seven on the US Billboard Hot 100. The music video for "Jesus to a Child" was directed by Howard Greenhalgh, depicting Michael in a dark room, with a small light on his face.

After Michael's death in 2016, Dame Esther Rantzen, founder of the charity ChildLine, revealed that Michael had secretly donated all of the single's royalties to the charity. She said "George helped us to reach out to hundreds of thousands of children through his generosity. I met him a couple of times, he approached us, rather than us going cap in hand to him, but it was an intensely personal gift. He didn’t want it to be known or to be part of his image." She told BBC News that "he really wanted to keep his help secret, it was an intensely personal gift. It meant we could answer more children."

== Background ==
Although "Jesus to a Child" was not commercially released until 8 January 1996, Michael unveiled the song on 24 November 1994 during the inaugural MTV Europe Music Awards, where he performed it in front of Berlin's Brandenburg Gate. According to Michael, the song was recorded "over five days", but written "in just a couple of hours".

The song was Michael's first self-penned hit in his homeland for almost four years, becoming his first solo single to enter the UK Singles Chart at number one. On the US Billboard Hot 100, it became the highest new entry by a British artist for more than 25 years, entering at number seven. In Spain, the single held the top spot for seven non-consecutive weeks.

== Content ==
The song was a melancholy tribute to Michael's Brazilian lover Anselmo Feleppa, whom he met when performing in Rio de Janeiro in 1991. Feleppa died two years later from an AIDS-related brain haemorrhage. Michael had been unable to write for the next 18 months as a consequence of his grief. The song is written with a rhythm and harmony that is influenced by the Brazilian bossa nova style.

The exact identity of the song's subject—and the nature of their relationship—was cause for a certain amount of innuendo at the time, as Michael had not confirmed his homosexuality and did not do so until 1998. Michael would consistently dedicate the song to Feleppa before performing it live.

== Critical reception ==
Barry Walters from The Advocate wrote that on the song, "Michael compares the emotion of a now-deceased lover to that of the Lord, who was, after all, a man. The tone is intensely elegiac, and it doesn't take a stretch of the imagination to consider this a love song to a boyfriend who has died of AIDS." Larry Flick from Billboard magazine complimented it as a "gorgeous, quietly insinuating pop ballad." He noted that the words "are, by turns, melancholic and romantic and are delivered with delicate ease", adding that "musically, Michael layers light, shuffling percussion with mild acoustic guitar lines and sweetly understated strings." Steve Baltin from Cash Box declared it as a "lush ballad", adding that "he's never sounded more Adult Contemporary than he does here. 'Jesus to a Child' is a hit as surely as some sport will strike this year." Daily Mirror named it "George's 'best-ever' song". Sarah Davis from Dotmusic remarked that in the context of the album, "Jesus to a Child" "sets the scene for Michael's current direction—brooding, mature, reflective but not so downbeat as to disallow the good times." Entertainment Weekly gave it a C−, calling it a "dispirited, tortoise-paced ballad, which drags on for nearly seven minutes". The writer added that "there's only one retort—bring back Andrew Ridgeley!" Caroline Sullivan for The Guardian felt it is "the best thing on the album" and named it Single of the Week. She said, "The tune itself is a Michael ballad in excelsis. The likes of 'Careless Whisper' (1984) and 'A Different Corner' (1986) can now be seen as trial runs for this one, which incorporates every GM hallmark from anguished upward vocal inflections to tasteful acoustic guitar."

Swedish Göteborgsposten concluded that here, Michael "showed that he still mastered the craft." Jan DeKnock from Knight Ridder praised it as a "mesmerizing ballad" and a "stunning effort". Paul Lester from Melody Maker said it is "all bossa nova rhythms and Spanish guitar over which George softly whispers a requiem for his departed lover". Music Week gave it a score of four out of five and named it Single of the Week, writing, "A typically slushy ballad—with echoes of 'Careless Whisper'—it will, no doubt, do the business, whatever the critics think." People Magazine described it as "a long-winded bossa nova synth-pop concoction". Michael E. Ross from Salon Magazine complimented the song as one of the best on the Older album, adding it as "almost painfully thoughtful. In lush, silken musical settings, Michael speaks the world-weary language of scorned love." David Sinclair from The Times opined that "the bittersweet lyric has a certain romantic appeal, but the message of hope comes swathed in layers of introspection and self-pity". Ed Morales for Vibe felt that "the Sade-style synth chords that rule 'Jesus to a Child' bolster Michael's typically breathy but precise musings. 'There's a sadness in my eyes', he croons, and you can feel it."

== Retrospective response ==
The Daily Vault's Melanie Love described the song as an "ode to his lost lover", adding that it is "haunting in its bareness and sentiment, while the restrained drums and winding synths are a perfect match for Michael's deep, pained voice as he promises, "So the words that you could not say, I'll sing them for you"." Tom Ewing of Freaky Trigger stated that "this is his monument, a work Michael needs his public to hear. Even though few at the time knew the story behind it, the sincerity, and the will to somehow pass on something extraordinary and vanished, is palpable. It's a heartfelt celebration of the effect love can have on a life, and it's a songwriter consciously setting himself his hardest possible task, and achieving it." Victoria Segal from NME viewed it as "irresistibly maudlin." In 2017, Dave Fawbert from ShortList named it "one of the most beautiful songs ever written". Eric Henderson from Slant Magazine wrote, "'Jesus to a Child' is among the most haunting of Michael's ballads, and one whose meaning could only fully emerge after his coming out. A slow-motion flamenco cry, written following the death of his lover, Anselmo Feleppa, 'Jesus to a Child' still remains supernaturally clear-eyed about what it means to love and to lose. "I've been loved so I know just what love is/And the lover that I kissed is always by my side/The lover I still miss was Jesus to a child".

== Music video ==
George Michael in the music video of "Jesus to a Child".

The accompanying music video for "Jesus to a Child" was storyboarded by Andrew Trovaioli and directed by British director Howard Greenhalgh. The atmospheric and delicately surreal video features the lithe bodies of male and female ballet dancers, for whom collapsing piles of dust and a swooping pendulum ball signify the passing of time and the loss of love, as well as their own mortality. It also feature images of flames, waves, and shadow in languid slow motion. The scenes of Michael shows him standing alone in a dark room, with a small light on his face as he performs. In the beginning of the video, two shirtless boys appears holding hands through the frames of separate wooden boxes. This image reappears near the end. While Michael sings, "You will always be my love", the boys vanish from their boxes as if they were ghosts.

The BBC insisted on pixillating the nipples of the dancers for broadcast, while MTV restricted it to late-night play.

== Track listings ==
- UK CD1 and cassette single
- US CD single
- Australian CD and cassette single
1. "Jesus to a Child" – 6:50
2. "One More Try" (live gospel version at Concert of Hope '93) – 5:21
3. "Older" (instrumental version) – 5:18
- UK CD2
1. "Jesus to a Child" – 6:50
2. "Freedom '94" (live version at MTV Europe Music Awards) – 6:04
3. "One More Try" (live gospel version at Concert of Hope '93) – 5:21
4. "Older" (instrumental version) – 5:18
- European CD single
- US 7-inch and cassette single
1. "Jesus to a Child" – 6:50
2. "One More Try" (live gospel version at Concert of Hope '93) – 5:21

== Charts ==
=== Weekly charts ===
Chart (1996)	Peak position
Australia (ARIA)	1
Austria (Ö3 Austria Top 40)	11
Belgium (Ultratop 50 Flanders)	3
Belgium (Ultratop 50 Wallonia)	2
Canada Top Singles (RPM)	10
Canada Adult Contemporary (RPM)	1
Czech Republic (IFPI CR)	8
Denmark (IFPI)	4
Europe (Eurochart Hot 100)	2
Europe Airplay (European Hit Radio)	1
Europe Channel Crossovers (Music & Media)	1
Finland (Suomen virallinen lista)	1
France (SNEP)	7
Germany (GfK)	12
Hungary (Mahasz)	1
Iceland (Íslenski Listinn Topp 40)	14
Ireland (IRMA)	1
Israel (Israeli Singles Chart)	1
Italy (Musica e dischi)	2
Japan (Oricon)	62
Netherlands (Dutch Top 40)	3
Netherlands (Single Top 100)	2
New Zealand (Recorded Music NZ)	5
Norway (VG-lista)	1
Scottish Singles Sales (Official Charts)	1
Spain (AFYVE)	1
Sweden (Sverigetopplistan)	2
Switzerland (Schweizer Hitparade)	4
UK Singles (Official Charts)	1
UK Airplay (Music Week)	1
US Billboard Hot 100	7
US Adult Contemporary (Billboard)	5
US Adult Pop Airplay (Billboard)	20
US Hot R&B/Hip-Hop Songs (Billboard)	22
US Pop Airplay (Billboard)	20
US Cash Box Top 100	10
US AC (Radio & Records)	3
US CHR/Pop (Radio & Records)	18
US Hot AC (Radio & Records)	13
US NAC Tracks (Radio & Records)	5

=== Year-end charts ===
Chart (1996)	Position
Australia (ARIA)	90
Belgium (Ultratop 50 Flanders)	49
Belgium (Ultratop 50 Wallonia)	12
Canada Top Singles (RPM)	71
Canada Adult Contemporary (RPM)	10
Europe (Eurochart Hot 100)	11
Europe (European Hit Radio)	6
France (SNEP)	58
Germany (Media Control)	89
Iceland (Íslenski Listinn Topp 40)	98
Israel (Israeli Singles Chart)	24
Italy (Musica e dischi)	8
Netherlands (Dutch Top 40)	87
Netherlands (Single Top 100)	60
Sweden (Topplistan)	51
Switzerland (Schweizer Hitparade)	27
UK Singles (Official Charts)	38
UK Airplay (Music Week)	37
US Adult Contemporary (Billboard)	40
US AC (Radio & Records)	36
US Hot AC (Radio & Records)	68
US NAC Tracks (Radio & Records)	26

== Certifications ==
Region	Certification	Certified units/sales
Belgium (BRMA)	Gold	25,000^{*}
France (SNEP)	Gold	250,000^{*}
New Zealand (RMNZ)	Gold	5,000^{*}
Norway (IFPI Norway)	Gold	
Spain (Promusicae)	Gold	25,000^{^}
United Kingdom (BPI)	Platinum	600,000^{‡}
United States (RIAA)	Gold	500,000^{^}
^{*} Sales figures based on certification alone.^{^} Shipments figures based on certification alone.^{‡} Sales+streaming figures based on certification alone.
