= Rock n Roll Jesus =

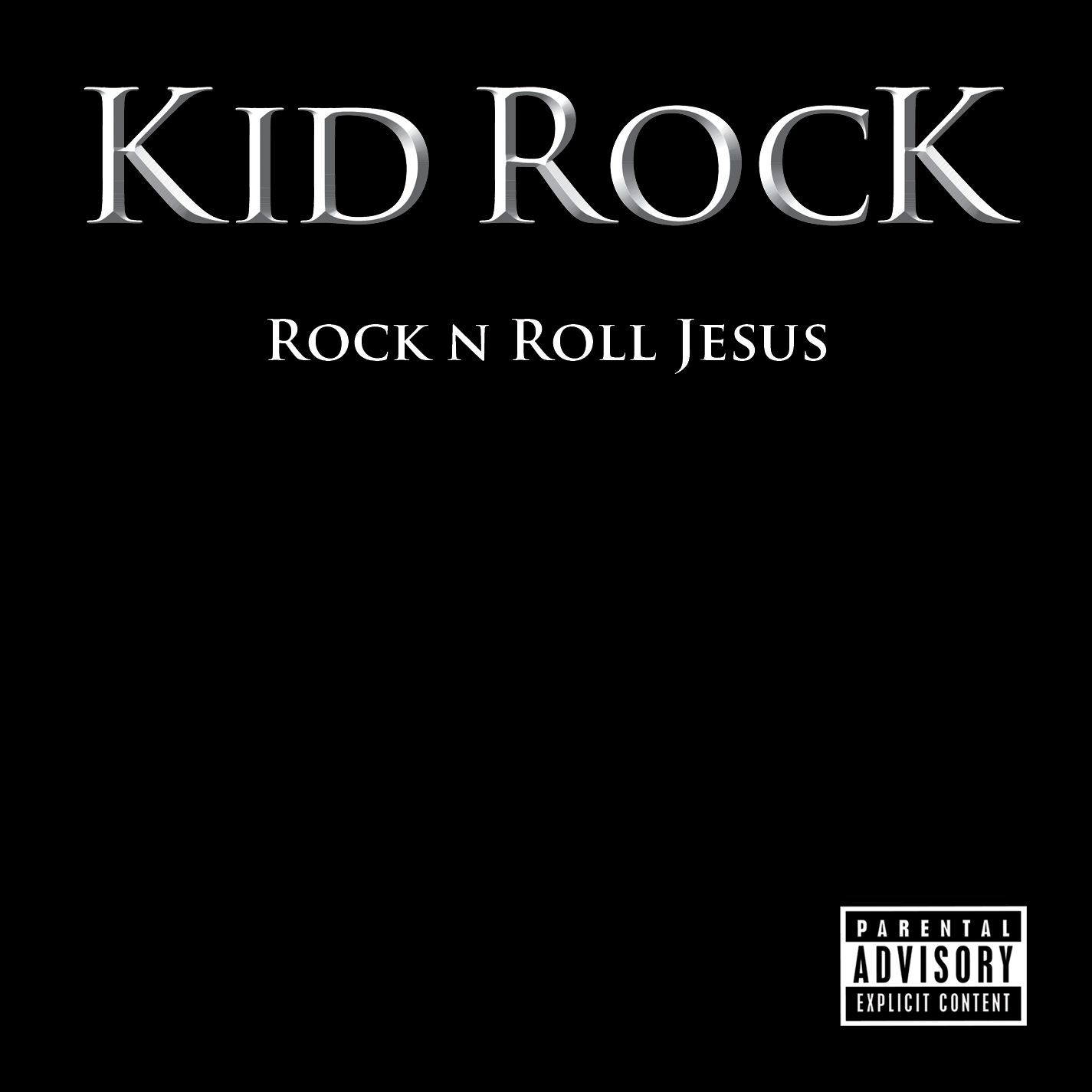
- iTunes cover art

Studio album by Kid Rock
- Released: October 9, 2007
- Studio: The Allen Roadhouse
- Genres: Hard rock; heartland rock; country
- Length: 57:07
- Labels: Atlantic; Top Dog
- Producers: Kid Rock; Rob Cavallo; Mike E. Clark

Kid Rock chronology
Live Trucker (2006)	Rock n Roll Jesus (2007)	Born Free (2010)

Singles from Rock n Roll Jesus
- 1. "So Hott" Released: August 9, 2007; 2. "Amen" Released: November 5, 2007; 3. "All Summer Long" Released: March 17, 2008; 4. "Roll On" Released: September 23, 2008; 5. "Rock n Roll Jesus" Released: January 19, 2009; 6. "Blue Jeans and a Rosary" Released: June 1, 2009

Rock n Roll Jesus is the seventh studio album by Kid Rock, released on October 9, 2007. Rob Cavallo co-produced the album with Rock. The album was not available at the iTunes Store in an act of protest by Kid Rock regarding a royalties dispute. It was nominated for two Grammy Awards for Best Rock Album and Best Male Vocal Performance for "All Summer Long" at the 2009 Grammy Awards. "All Summer Long" from the album was named the official theme song for WWE Backlash 2008 as well as "So Hott" for WrestleMania XXV and "New Orleans" for WrestleMania 34.

== Musical style ==
The album features the vocals of golfer John Daly on "Half Your Age" and the rock hit "All Summer Long"; the latter of which brought the album to triple platinum status in the U.S. and in Canada. "Sugar" is the only song on the album that features rapping vocals. This would be the last album that Rock raps on until 2017's Sweet Southern Sugar.

== Singles ==
The album's first two singles, "So Hott" and "Amen", both did relatively well on the Mainstream Rock and Modern Rock charts. On the Mainstream Rock chart, the singles peaked at No. 2 and No. 11, respectively—the former one becoming the biggest rock hit of his career. The tracks peaked at No. 13 and No. 27, respectively, on the Modern Rock chart.

The album's third single, "All Summer Long", was a massive worldwide hit. It peaked at No. 23 on the Hot 100 chart, despite Rock boycotting iTunes and receiving minimum digital downloads, and No. 4 on the country chart. It went to number one on charts in eight countries across Europe and Australia. "Roll On" and "Rock n Roll Jesus" were released at the same time as follow ups to "All Summer Long". "Roll On" failed to chart in the U.S. but reached No. 59 in Germany and No. 67 in Austria. "Rock n Roll Jesus" peaked at No. 34 on the U.S. Mainstream Rock chart.

The album's sixth single, "Blue Jeans and a Rosary", was released in January 2009. It would peak at No. 50 on the U.S. Country Chart. "Lowlife (Living the Highlife)" was released as the album's seventh single on March 8, 2009.

== Critical reception ==
Professional ratings
Aggregate scores
Source	Rating
Metacritic	62/100
Review scores
Source	Rating
AllMusic	2.5/5 stars
The A.V. Club	C+
Blender	3.5/5 stars
Entertainment Weekly	B
The Independent	3/5 stars
Now	3/5 stars
Mojo	3/5 stars
Q	1/5 stars
Rolling Stone	4/5 stars
Uncut	6/10

According to the review aggregator Metacritic, Rock n Roll Jesus received "generally favorable reviews" based on a weighted average score of 62 out of 100 from 12 critic scores. Rolling Stone gave the album 4 out of 5 stars, stating "His good-hearted faith in rock & roll delivers a powerful kick. As he well knows—and Rock N Roll Jesus proves—roaring guitars, truckloads of attitude and an unquenchable lust for life make up for a multitude of sins." Billboard stated "We may be more entertained at times by Rock's extramusical affairs, but the "Devil" should still be given his due as a clever and creative musical force." Allmusic was less enthusiastic, calling it "big, bold, and brainless" and stating, "splashy and silly though it may be, at least it gets the basic sound right, even if it's way too polished and precise."

== Commercial performance ==
The album debuted at number one on the U.S. Billboard 200 chart, selling about 172,000 copies in its first week. It is Kid Rock's only album to top the Billboard 200. The album rebounded in March 2008 when "All Summer Long" was released as a single climbing back into the Top 10 on the Billboard 200 staying for 17 weeks. It has been certified 3 times platinum by the RIAA and it had sold 3,493,000 copies in the US as of December 2013.

The album was certified 2 times platinum in Canada and gold in Germany, Austria and Australia.

== Track listing ==
No.	Title	Writer(s)	Length
1.	"Rock n Roll Jesus"	Robert James Ritchie (Kid Rock), Ken Tudrick, Marlon Young	4:29
2.	"Amen"	Ritchie	4:40
3.	"All Summer Long"	Ritchie, Matthew Shafer (Uncle Kracker), Ed King, Gary Rossington, Ronnie Van Zant, LeRoy Marinell, Waddy Wachtel, Warren Zevon	4:57
4.	"Roll On"	Ritchie	6:11
5.	"So Hott"	Ritchie, Young	4:07
6.	"Sugar"	Ritchie, Shafer, Young, Bobby Ervin, Jason Krause, Dwayne Simon, James Smith	3:44
7.	"When U Love Someone"	Ritchie, Shafer, Young	5:40
8.	"New Orleans" (David Allan Coe cover)	David Allan Coe	6:36
9.	"Don't Tell Me U Love Me"	Ritchie, Shafer, Young	4:20
10.	"Blue Jeans and a Rosary"	Ritchie, Young	4:35
11.	"Half Your Age"	Ritchie	3:45
12.	"Lowlife (Living the Highlife)" (John Eddie cover)	John Eddie	4:04
Total length:			57:07

=== Bonus tracks ===
Best Buy version
No.	Title	Length
13.	"Guilty"	2:45
14.	"Jackson, Mississippi" (Left off 'Live' Trucker)	6:13

Wal-Mart limited edition
No.	Title	Length
13.	"Cowboy"	4:22
14.	"Lonely Road of Faith" (From CMT Crossroads)	5:29
15.	"Behind-The-Scenes Documentary"	--:--

Best Buy special edition bonus DVD
No.	Title	Length
13.	"So Hott" (From the 2008 Rock AM Festival in Germany)
14.	"All Summer Long" (From the 2008 Rock AM Festival in Germany)
15.	"Cowboy" (From the 2008 Rock AM Festival in Germany)
16.	"Amen" (music video)
17.	"Roll On" (music video)

=== Sample credits ===
- "All Summer Long" – "Sweet Home Alabama" by Lynyrd Skynyrd (piano outro, guitar solo, guitar hook before chorus), "Werewolves of London" by Warren Zevon (piano)
- "Sugar" – "I'm Bad" by LL Cool J (vocal sample only)

=== Demos ===
- "30 Days in the Hole" (Humble Pie cover)
- "Top Billin" (Audio Two cover)

== Personnel ==
- Kid Rock – lead vocals, lead guitar, acoustic guitar, banjo, 12 string guitar, rhythm guitar, lap steel guitar, piano, percussion, moog synth, talkbox, turntables, vox organ
- Marlon Young – lead guitar, acoustic guitar, bass guitar, mandolin
- Jason Krause – guitar
- Aaron Julison – bass guitar
- Jimmie Bones – piano, organ, harmonica
- Stefanie Eulinberg – drums
- Larry Fratangelo – conga drums, timbales, wave drum
- Billy Powell – piano
- David McMurray – saxophone
- Dan Dugmore – pedal steel
- Rayse Biggs – trumpet
- Paul Franklin – pedal steel
- David Campbell – string arrangements
- Barbara Payton – backing vocals
- Sylver Logan Sharp – backing vocals
- Jessica Wagner – backing vocals
- Hershel C Boone – backing vocals
- Vinnie Dombroski – drums on "Rock n Roll Jesus" and "So Hott"
- Jeff Fowlkes – drums on "New Orleans" and "Lowlife"
- Bobby East – slide guitar on "Lowlife"
- John Daly – vocals on "Half Your Age"

== Charts ==
=== Weekly charts ===
Chart (2007–2008)	Peak position
Australian Albums (ARIA)	9
Austrian Albums (Ö3 Austria)	2
Belgian Albums (Ultratop Flanders)	33
Canadian Albums (Billboard)	4
Danish Albums (Hitlisten)	25
Dutch Albums (Album Top 100)	19
French Albums (SNEP)	58
German Albums (Offizielle Top 100)	5
Irish Albums (IRMA)	4
Italian Albums (FIMI)	35
New Zealand Albums (RMNZ)	21
Norwegian Albums (VG-lista)	9
Swedish Albums (Sverigetopplistan)	8
Swiss Albums (Schweizer Hitparade)	4
UK Albums (Official Charts)	4
US Billboard 200	1
US Top Rock Albums (Billboard)	1

=== Year-end charts ===
Chart (2007)	Position
US Billboard 200	128
US Top Rock Albums (Billboard)	21

Chart (2008)	Position
Australian Albums (ARIA)	56
Austrian Albums (Ö3 Austria)	22
Canadian Albums (Billboard)	15
German Albums (Offizielle Top 100)	34
Swiss Albums (Schweizer Hitparade)	30
UK Albums (OCC)	146
US Billboard 200	6
US Top Rock Albums (Billboard)	1

Chart (2009)	Position
US Billboard 200	45
US Top Rock Albums (Billboard)	13

=== Decade-end charts ===
Chart (2000–2009)	Position
US Billboard 200	125

== Certifications ==
Region	Certification	Certified units/sales
Australia (ARIA)	Gold	35,000^{^}
Austria (IFPI Austria)	Gold	10,000^{*}
Canada (Music Canada)	2× Platinum	200,000^{^}
Germany (BVMI)	Gold	100,000^{^}
Switzerland (IFPI Switzerland)	Gold	15,000^{^}
United Kingdom (BPI)	Gold	100,000^{^}
United States (RIAA)	3× Platinum	3,000,000^{^}
^{*} Sales figures based on certification alone.^{^} Shipments figures based on certification alone.
