= WrestleMania 25 =

2009 World Wrestling Entertainment pay-per-view event

- Promotional poster featuring various WWE wrestlers
- Promotion: World Wrestling Entertainment
- Brand(s): Raw; SmackDown; ECW
- Date: April 5, 2009
- City: Houston, Texas
- Venue: Reliant Stadium
- Attendance: 72,744
- Buy rate: 975,000
- Tagline: The 25th Anniversary of WrestleMania

Pay-per-view chronology
← Previous; No Way Out	Next → Backlash

WrestleMania chronology
← Previous; XXIV	Next → XXVI

WrestleMania 25, also promoted as The 25th Anniversary of WrestleMania, was a 2009 professional wrestling pay-per-view (PPV) event produced by World Wrestling Entertainment (WWE). It was the 25th annual WrestleMania and took place on April 5, 2009, at Reliant Stadium in Houston, Texas, held for wrestlers from the promotion's Raw, SmackDown, and ECW brand divisions. This was the second WrestleMania held in Houston, after WrestleMania X-Seven in 2001 at the Reliant Astrodome. This would also be the last WrestleMania to feature the ECW brand, as it was dissolved in February 2010, and it was the first WrestleMania of the PG Era.

Eight matches were held on the event's card, which featured a supercard, a scheduling of more than one main bout. The final match of the night was a singles match in which Triple H defeated Randy Orton to retain SmackDown's WWE Championship. Another main match was a triple threat match for the World Heavyweight Championship, which was also briefly on SmackDown at the time, and saw Raw's John Cena defeat defending champion Edge and Big Show to win the championship and subsequently transfer the title to Raw. The main match of the ECW brand, which occurred during the pre-show, saw SmackDown's WWE Tag Team Champions The Colóns (Carlito and Primo) defeat ECW's World Tag Team Champions John Morrison and The Miz in a lumberjack match to unify the two championships as the Unified WWE Tag Team Championship; both titles remained independently active but could be defended on any brand under the unification. Another marquee match saw The Undertaker defeat Shawn Michaels to extend his undefeated WrestleMania streak to 17–0. Featured matches on the undercard included Matt Hardy defeating Jeff Hardy in an Extreme Rules match, Chris Jericho defeated the team of Roddy Piper, Ricky Steamboat, and Jimmy Snuka, and the annual Money in the Bank ladder match, which was won by CM Punk over Christian, Finlay, Kane, Kofi Kingston, Mark Henry, Montel Vontavious Porter, and Shelton Benjamin.

Tickets for the event commenced sale to the public on November 8, 2008. For the third consecutive year, WrestleMania broke the record for the highest-grossing pay-per-view in WWE history, grossing US$6.9 million in ticket sales, which included fans from all 50 U.S. states, 24 countries, and seven Canadian provinces. WrestleMania 25 generated approximately 960,000 pay-per-view buys, grossing $21.0 million in revenue. The event pumped an estimated $49.8 million into the local economy and generated $5.7 million in local tax revenue, equating to 600 full-time jobs for the area. With an attendance of 72,744, it is the eighth largest attendance in WrestleMania history.

== Production ==
=== Background ===
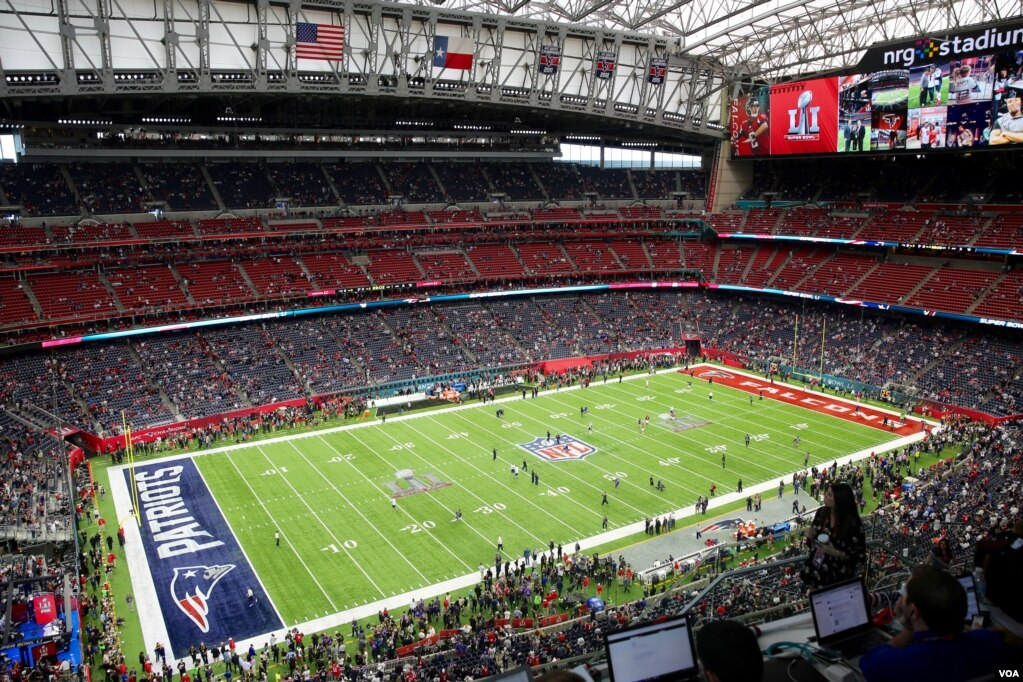
The 25th annual WrestleMania was held at Reliant Stadium in Houston, Texas, which was the second WrestleMania in Houston, after WrestleMania X-Seven in 2001 at the Reliant Astrodome.

WrestleMania is considered World Wrestling Entertainment's (WWE) flagship professional wrestling pay-per-view (PPV) event, having first been held in 1985. It has become the longest-running professional wrestling event in history and is held annually between mid-March to mid-April. It was the first of WWE's original four pay-per-views, which includes Royal Rumble, SummerSlam, and Survivor Series, referred to as the "Big Four". WrestleMania 25 was held on April 5, 2009, at Reliant Stadium in Houston, Texas and featured wrestlers from the Raw, SmackDown, and ECW brands. Despite being the 24th anniversary of the inaugural WrestleMania in 1985, WWE marketed the event as "The 25th Anniversary of WrestleMania" and written as "WrestleMania 25th Anniversary".

As the second WrestleMania to be held in Houston and in the U.S. state of Texas after WrestleMania X-Seven in 2001 at the Reliant Astrodome, WWE mainly promoted WrestleMania 25 under the tagline "Everything Is Bigger in Texas, Especially WrestleMania" since its announcement at WrestleMania XXIV in March 2008. WWE later began using "The 25th Anniversary of WrestleMania" name in late 2008 to primarily promote the event. Tickets for WrestleMania 25 were originally scheduled to go on sale on September 20, 2008, but had to be postponed out of concern for the residents near the Gulf of Mexico due to Hurricane Ike and the disaster area declaration by Texas Governor Rick Perry. Following another postponement due to the effect of Ike on the state of Texas, WWE announced that ticket sales would be postponed until November 8, 2008.

The official theme songs for the event were AC/DC's "War Machine" and their live version of "Shoot to Thrill", as well as "So Hott" by Kid Rock. Other songs used at the event included "Crash" by Decyfer Down and "Touched" by VAST.

=== Marketing ===
According to WWE's executive vice president, Michelle Wilson, WrestleMania 25 featured the most extensive promotional campaign in WrestleMania history at the time. Promotion for the event included a merchandise deal with Kmart enabling discounts on the pay-per-view's retail price, as well as deals with DirecTV and Dish Network to promote through interactive television. The campaign also saw WWE mail to previous purchasers of WrestleMania, professional boxing, and mixed martial arts pay-per-views to order their show. WWE spent US$10 million for cross-channel spots on television networks such as ESPN, MTV, and the USA Network. The Army National Guard were the primary sponsor for the event, using the event to help enhance their recruitment. To commemorate the event, THQ and Yuke's produced a video game, WWE Legends of WrestleMania, that was released a few weeks prior to the event and featured past competitors from the company.

As with previous WrestleMania events, a series of events were held in the week preceding WrestleMania 25. For the second consecutive year, WrestleManiArt, an art exhibition and auction featuring work by WWE wrestlers and local artists, was held at the Julia Ideson Building on April 1, with the proceeds going to Houston Public Library Foundation. WrestleMania's annual fan convention, WrestleMania Axxess, was held from April 2 through April 5 at Reliant Center. On April 4, WWE hosted its annual WWE Hall of Fame ceremony at Houston's Toyota Center, where the Class of 2009 was inducted.

=== Storylines ===
WrestleMania featured professional wrestling matches that involved different wrestlers from pre-existing scripted feuds, plots, and storylines that were played out on Monday Night Raw, Friday Night SmackDown, and ECW on Sci Fi—WWE's primary television programs. The event featured wrestlers from WWE's Raw, SmackDown, and ECW brands—a storyline division in which WWE's employees are assigned to a television program of the same name.

John "Bradshaw" Layfield (JBL) defeated CM Punk on the March 9 episode of Raw to win the WWE Intercontinental Championship. A week later, JBL's old rival Rey Mysterio issued a challenge to face JBL for the Intercontinental Championship at WrestleMania. With the match accepted by JBL, this would be the first time since WrestleMania X8 that the Intercontinental Championship would be defended at WrestleMania. On the March 30 episode of Raw, JBL was pinned by Mysterio in a non-title match.

At No Way Out, Shawn Michaels defeated John "Bradshaw" Layfield (JBL) in a match with the added stipulation that if JBL had won, he would have become the owner of Michaels' name and likeness. On the February 16 episode of Raw, Michaels challenged JBL to another match, with the winner advancing to WrestleMania to challenge The Undertaker to attempt to end his undefeated streak at the event. The next week on Raw, Michaels defeated JBL, but it was later announced that another competitor would stand in his way to prevent him from advancing to the show in the form of Vladimir Kozlov, who also made a challenge to Undertaker; the two wrestled the next week on Raw with Michaels defeating Kozlov, and earning his match with Undertaker. The next week on Raw, Undertaker and Michaels defeated Kozlov and JBL in a tag match. After the match, Michaels attacked Undertaker. The pair played mind games with each other over the following weeks.

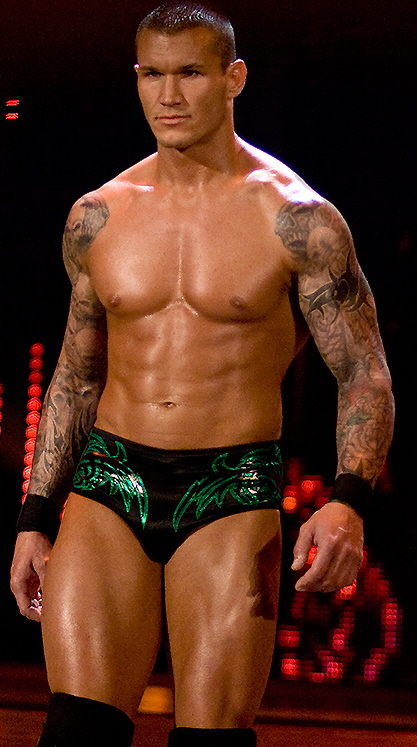
Randy Orton, who won the Royal Rumble match as a Raw wrestler, challenged for SmackDown's WWE Championship at WrestleMania 25

The headline of WrestleMania 25 was a confrontation over the WWE Championship, rooted at the Royal Rumble pay-per-view event in January by Raw's Randy Orton winning the Royal Rumble match. Per the stipulation of the match, Orton was given the opportunity to choose to wrestle for either the WWE Championship, World Heavyweight Championship, or ECW Championship at WrestleMania. Simultaneously, Orton began to assault the McMahon family, the owners of WWE. During this conflict, Orton punted both Vince McMahon and Shane McMahon (father and son, respectively) in the head as well as RKO-ing Stephanie McMahon (Vince's daughter), which enraged Triple H, SmackDown's WWE Champion and Stephanie's husband. Triple H. On the March 2 episode of Raw, Triple H convinced Orton to use his title opportunity in a match for the WWE Championship at WrestleMania. The following weeks saw Triple H attack Orton both backstage and at his house. In retaliation, Orton attacked Triple H's wife Stephanie McMahon. As a result, Triple H recruited his brother-in-law and father-in-law, Shane and Vince McMahon respectively.

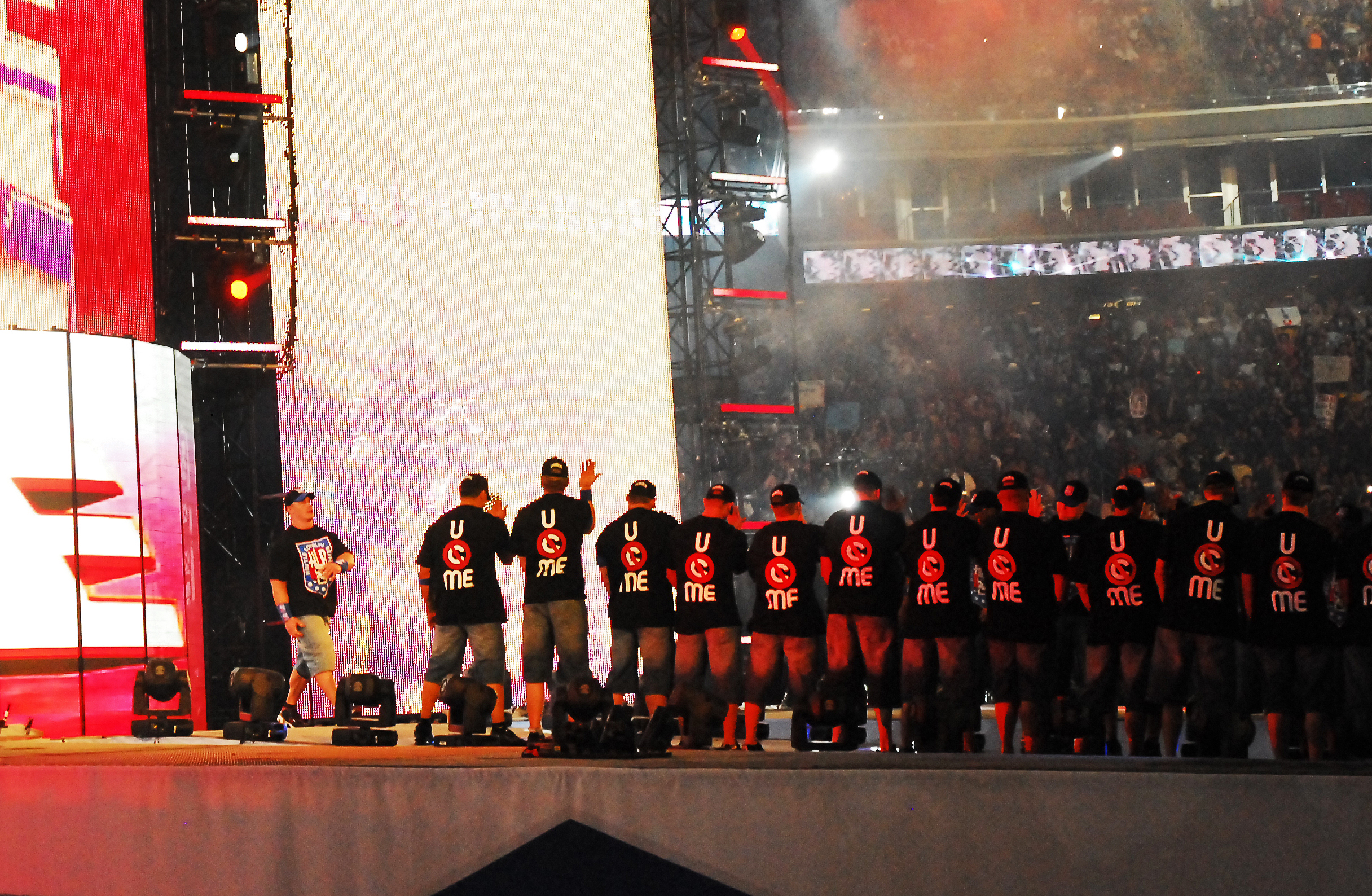
Raw's John Cena, seen here making his entrance at WrestleMania 25, challenged Edge and Big Show for SmackDown's World Heavyweight Championship, held by Edge; Cena won the title, transferring it to Raw

After the main event of the March 2 episode of Raw, SmackDown general manager Vickie Guerrero announced that her husband Edge would defend his World Heavyweight Championship against Big Show at WrestleMania. A contract to be signed to make the match official was intended to be held on the next episode of SmackDown; however, John Cena, from whom Edge won the World Heavyweight Championship at the previous month's pay per view, No Way Out (in the Elimination Chamber match), interfered with the signing before whispering a message in Vickie's ear prompting the signing to be canceled. The next week on Raw, Vickie announced to the surprise of Edge and Big Show that Cena would be in the match, thus making it a Triple Threat match. It was soon revealed that the match would involve the new challenger based on Cena extorting Guerrero with footage of the general manager having adulterous relations with Big Show. The next week on Raw, Edge, Vickie and Big Show were set to confront Cena due to Cena revealing the affair between Vickie and Big Show, much to the chagrin of all three. As a result, Guerrero arranged a match pitting Edge against Cena with herself serving as a special guest referee. With all that misdirected hostility focused on Cena, who could not touch Vickie or he would sacrifice his World Heavyweight Championship match at WrestleMania, a lopsided confrontation seemed inevitable. As Edge and Cena battled, Big Show walked down the ramp toward the ring. When he arrived, Edge joined him in tying Cena up within the ring ropes. Fittingly, each drove their anger in his direction: Edge speared him, Vickie slapped him and Big Show drove his giant fist into Cena's ribs several times before clocking him in the jaw. Edge then speared Big Show and sent a message that he would retain his title at WrestleMania.

The fifth annual Money in the Bank ladder match was announced for WrestleMania 25 on the February 23 episode of Raw. The briefcase holds a symbolic contract which the holder would be able to exchange for a WWE, World Heavyweight, or ECW Championship match at any time or location of his choosing up until one year. To participate in the match, a wrestler had to first qualify for it by winning a match; this process began on the February 23 episode of Raw, in which CM Punk qualified by defeating The Miz and John Morrison in a Triple Threat match. The next week of Raw, Kane defeated Rey Mysterio and Mike Knox in another Triple Threat match. The next night on ECW, Mark Henry qualified for the match by defeating Santino Marella. Both Montel Vontavious Porter (MVP) and Shelton Benjamin qualified for the match on the March 6 episode of SmackDown by defeating Matt Hardy and Jeff Hardy in respective singles matches. On the March 9 episode of Raw, Kofi Kingston qualified by defeating Chris Jericho. Christian qualified the next night on ECW by winning a battle royal when he last eliminated Chavo Guerrero Jr. Finlay was the final wrestler to qualify for the match when he defeated The Brian Kendrick on the March 13 episode of SmackDown. Over the following weeks, the participants competed in eight-man tag team matches and an eight-man battle royal.

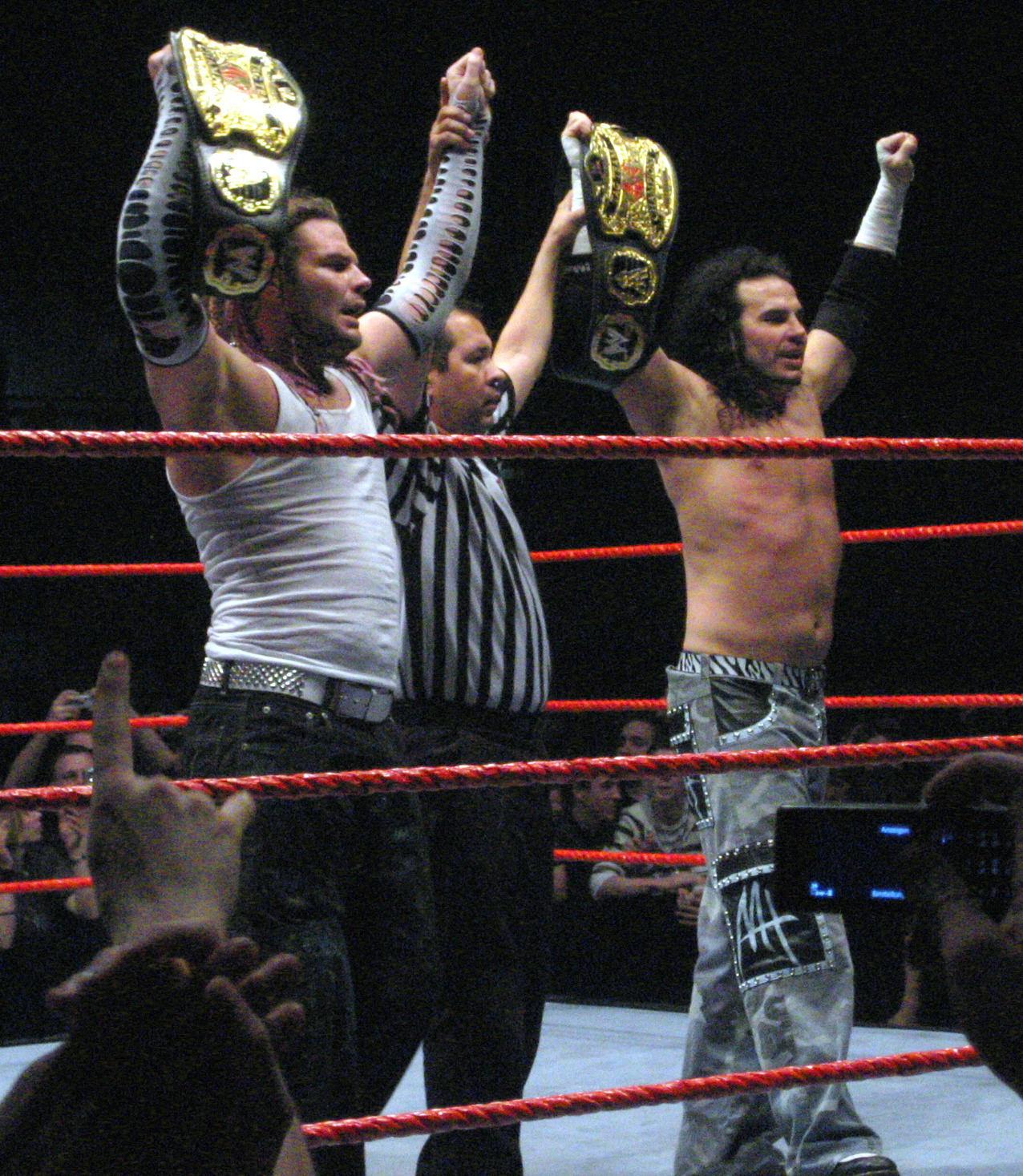
Brothers Jeff Hardy (left) and Matt Hardy (right) engaged in a rivalry before WrestleMania.

The buildup to WrestleMania 25 also included a rivalry between brothers Matt and Jeff Hardy. During Jeff's match against Edge at the Royal Rumble for the WWE Championship, Matt came down to the ring, appearing to help his brother. Instead, Matt turned on Jeff by hitting him with a steel chair, costing Jeff the match and his WWE title. After losing his Money in the Bank qualifying match to MVP on the March 6 episode of SmackDown, Matt interfered in Jeff's qualifying match later that night by punching Jeff's opponent, Shelton Benjamin, disqualifying Jeff from the match. A week later, Matt provoked Jeff even further by referring to Jeff's recent accidents, including Jeff's incident at the night of Survivor Series where he was found unconscious in a hotel stairwell (which caused him to be removed of the WWE Championship match and being replaced by Edge at that event), the recent account of someone driving Jeff off the road, and the misfiring of the pyrotechnics in his entrance. Matt then talked about the fire to Jeff's house a year prior, killing his dog Jack. This ultimately led to Jeff retaliating against his brother after weeks of passive resistance. Later that night, it was announced that Matt and Jeff would fight each other at WrestleMania with a subsequent announcement a week later declaring the match to be held under Extreme Rules.

On the January 23 episode of SmackDown, WWE Tag Team Champions The Colóns (Primo and Carlito) defeated World Tag Team Champions John Morrison and The Miz in a tag team match. After their loss, Miz and Morrison proceeded to harass their defeaters on their weekly Internet show, the Dirt Sheet, as well as profess the brothers' impotence towards their associates, The Bella Twins. The two teams wrestled again on the February 13 episode of SmackDown, with the winning team earning a date with the Bellas. Miz and Morrison won the rematch and the date. The two teams continued their feud in the coming weeks, and while the initial focus of the feud was the competition for the Bella Twins, the feud took on a dual purpose as each team successfully defended their respective titles in subsequent matches with both teams retaining their respective belts; it was announced on the March 17 episode of ECW that the WWE and World Tag Team titles would be unified at WrestleMania into what would be called the "Unified WWE Tag Team Championship", an umbrella term for the two titles being held together but remaining independently active.

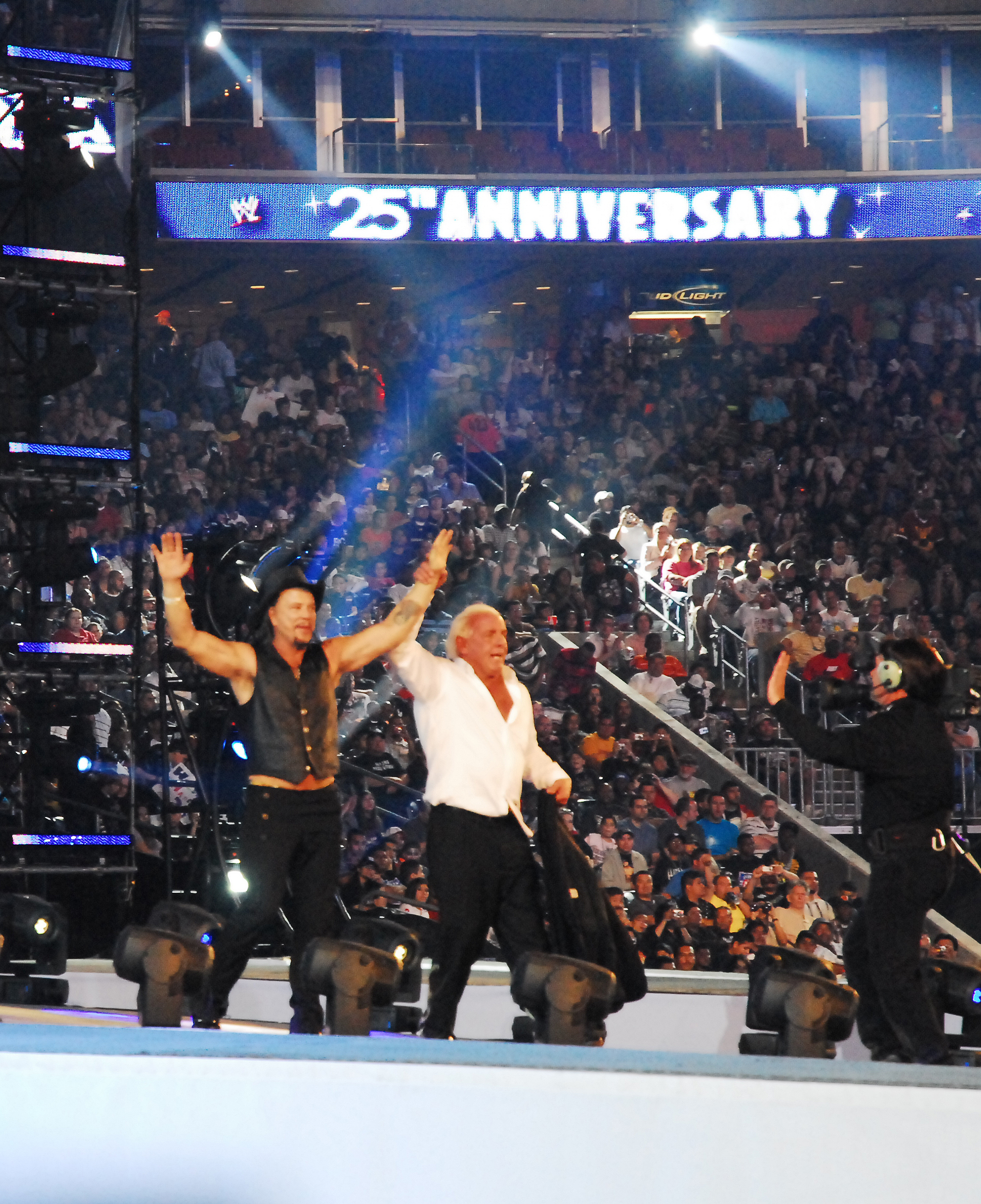
Ric Flair (right) with Mickey Rourke (left) at WrestleMania 25

At the 15th Screen Actors Guild Awards, actor Mickey Rourke, who gained critical acclaim at the time for his role in the film The Wrestler, had announced he would be competing at WrestleMania, specifically targeting Chris Jericho. The announcement led to a storyline confrontation between the two on Larry King Live, which showed signs of second thoughts from Rourke. On January 28, it was announced Rourke's spokesperson that the actor would not compete at the event, but would still be in attendance. Jericho's narrative subsequently evolved towards one of the themes from The Wrestler, which was the respect for older wrestlers after their careers start to decline, of which Jericho disapproved. On the February 9 episode of Raw, Ric Flair appeared to protest Jericho's tirades, professing that the wrestlers should be respected, as they had paved the way for the future generations to make a living, leading to a heated exchange between the two. Over the coming weeks, Jericho was confronted by a number of legends including Roddy Piper, Ricky Steamboat, and Jimmy Snuka on an episode of Piper's Pit hosted by Jericho himself. Each confrontation resulted in Jericho viciously attacking each respective wrestler. The following week, Jericho challenged Flair to a match. Although Flair declined (honoring his retirement from active competition), he offered to be in the corner of Piper, Steamboat, and Snuka for their challenge against Jericho in a handicap match. Jericho accepted the challenge, but subsequently attacked and bloodied Flair.

== Event ==
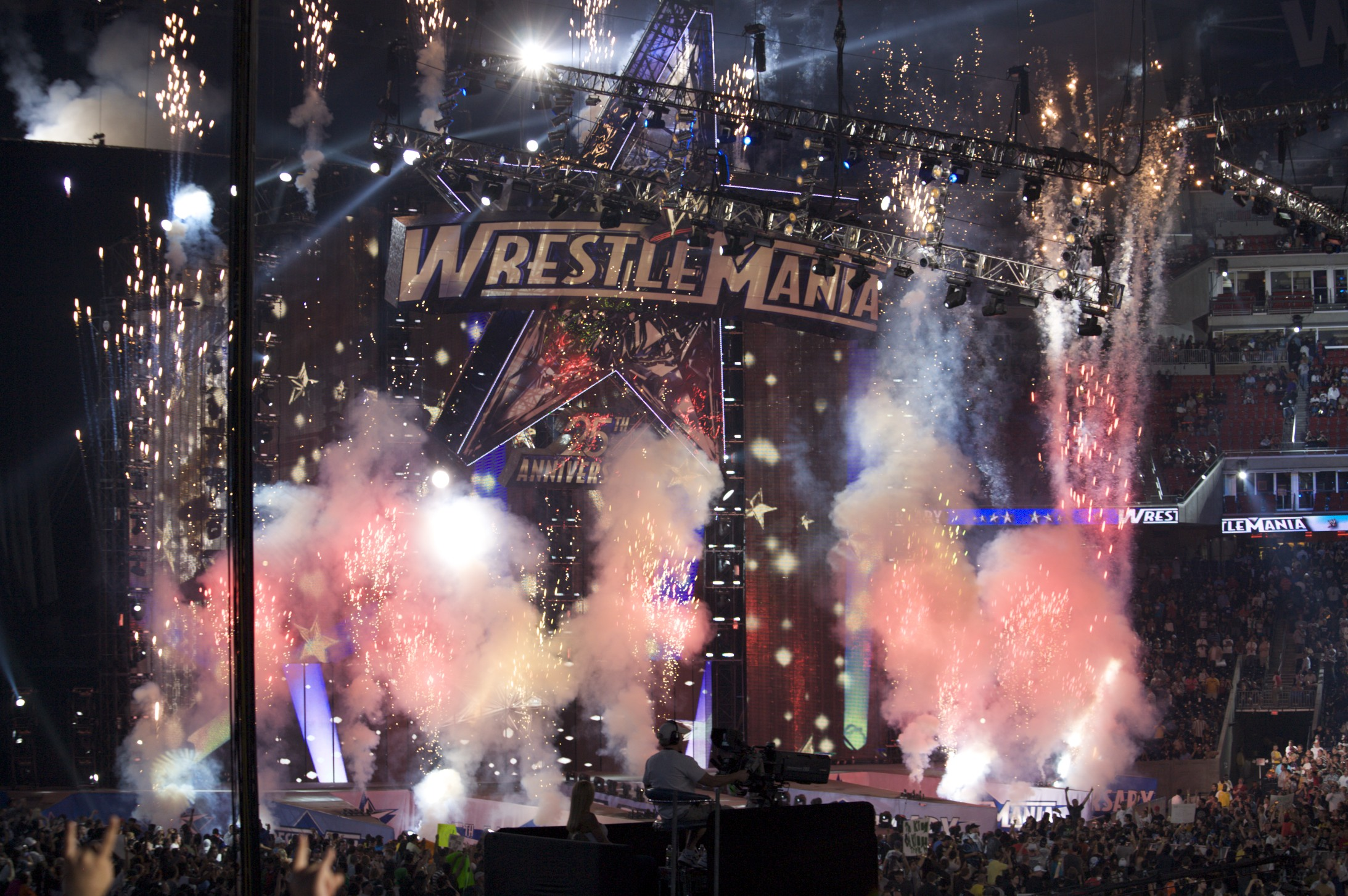
Pyrotechnics from the WrestleMania 25 entrance set, in front of an attendance of 72,744 fans

Other on-screen personnel
Role:	Name:
English commentators	Jim Ross
English commentators	Michael Cole
English commentators	Jerry Lawler
Spanish commentators	Carlos Cabrera
Spanish commentators	Hugo Savinovich
Interviewer	Todd Grisham
Ring announcer	Lilian Garcia (Raw)
Ring announcer	Justin Roberts (SmackDown/Money in the Bank match)
Referees	Charles Robinson
Referees	Mike Chioda
Referees	John Cone
Referees	Scott Armstrong
Referees	Jack Doan
Referees	Marty Elias
Referees	Chad Patton
Referees	Aaron Mahoney

=== Dark match ===
Before the event was aired live, the crowd in attendance were treated to a dark match, which featured the WWE Tag Team Champions The Colóns (Carlito and Primo) compete against the World Tag Team Champions John Morrison and The Miz in a Winner Takes All Lumberjack match, which has a number of wrestlers surround the ring in order to keep any competitor from avoiding the match, to unify the World Tag Team Championship and WWE Tag Team Championship as the Unified WWE Tag Team Championship. The Colóns won the encounter after Primo executed the Backstabber on Morrison.

As the event went live on pay-per-view and right before the opening pyro, Nicole Scherzinger sang "America the Beautiful".

=== Preliminary matches ===
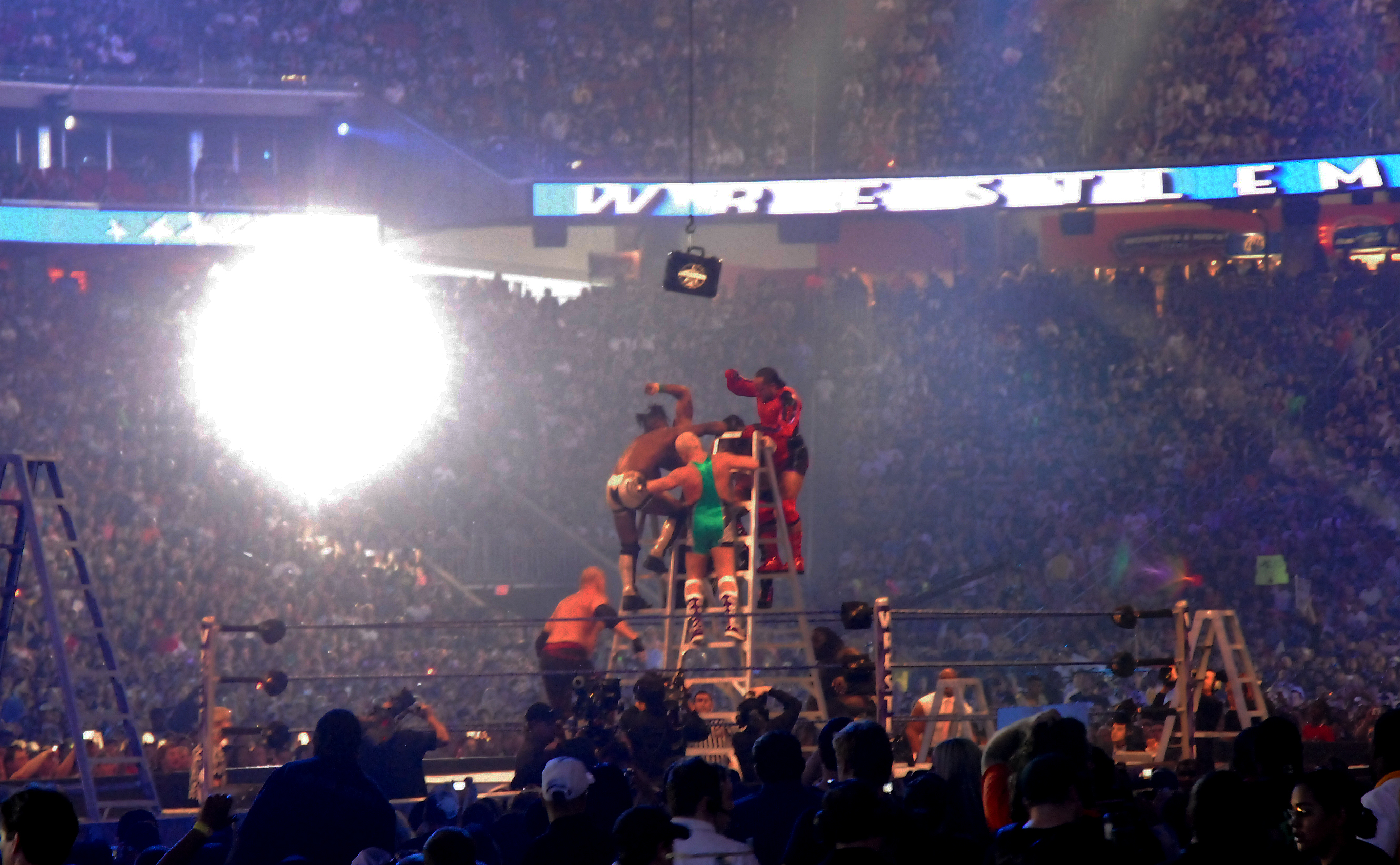
Wrestlers fighting on the ladder as part of the Money in the Bank ladder match

The Money in the Bank ladder match was the start of the event as the participants: CM Punk, Kane, Mark Henry, MVP, Shelton Benjamin, Kofi Kingston, Christian, and Finlay, fought for the briefcase that was suspended over the ring. The match was littered with many notable moments, including a series of the match's combatants performing dives onto the floor of the arena onto each other, as well as Benjamin diving off of the top of a ladder with a senton bomb onto his opponents. The ladder was also used as a weapon by the competitors, which saw it being thrown at each other or, in the case of Kingston, to be used as extra force dropped on their chest as Kofi incapacitated them by draping the collapsed ladder over their bodies and leg dropping onto the ladder. The finish came with Punk and Kane on top of the ladder, which saw Punk execute a series of kicks on Kane from atop the ladder, knocking him off. Punk went on to win the match after he grabbed the hanging briefcase. Punk's victory marked his second consecutive victory in the match.

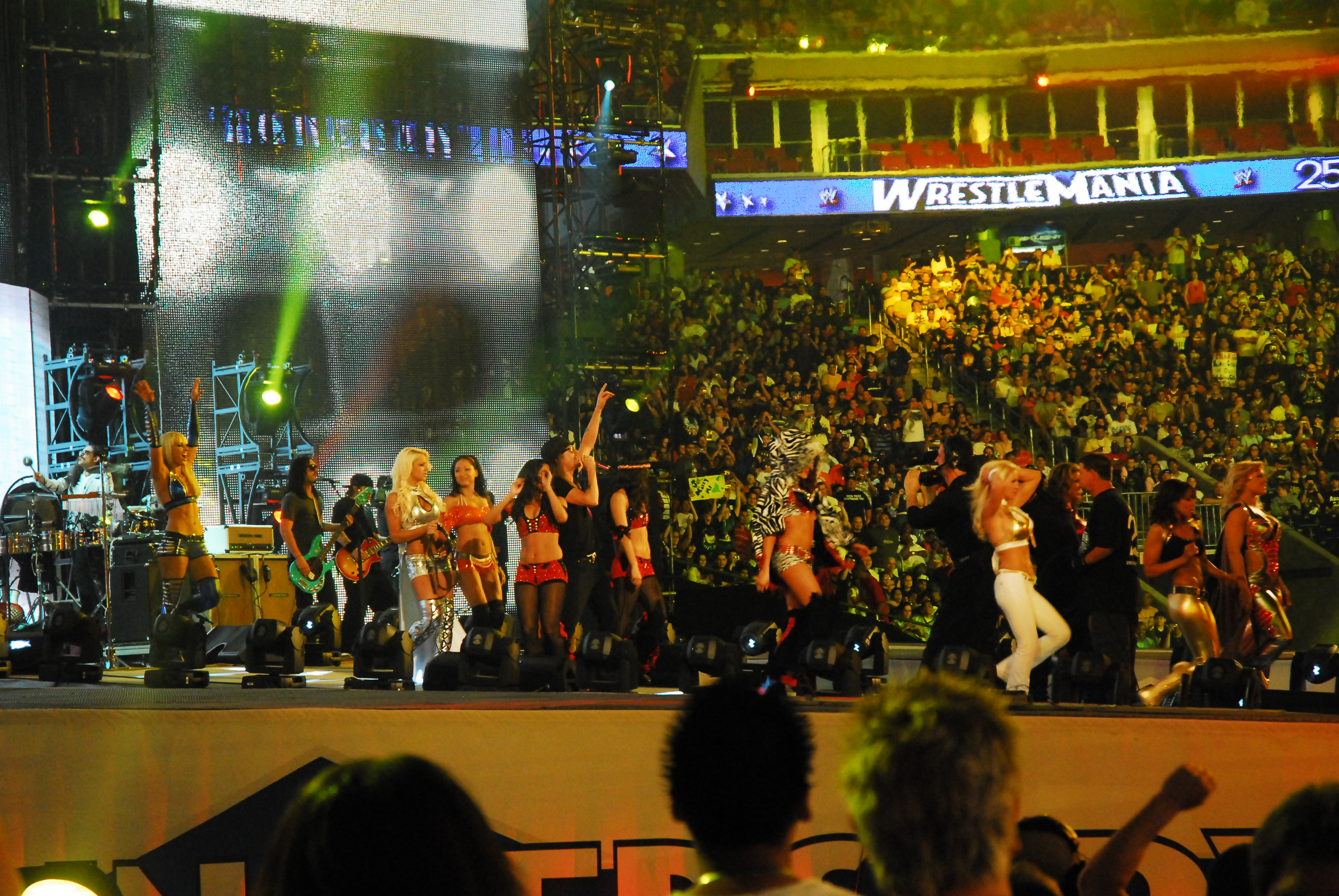
Kid Rock (center) performed while WWE Divas made their way to the ring for a battle royal.

After the match, Kid Rock performed a live medley of songs: "Bawitdaba", "Rock N Roll Jesus", "Cowboy", "All Summer Long", and "So Hott". During the last song, the female competitors of WWE came to the ring to compete in a 25-Diva battle royal to crown "Miss WrestleMania". The match featured Divas that were employed by WWE at the time and former Divas that had worked for WWE in the past, including; Jackie Gayda, Joy Giovanni, Molly Holly, Sunny, Torrie Wilson and Victoria. Santino Marella, who portrayed a diva called "Santina", his twin sister, won the match and was crowned "Miss WrestleMania". Mae Young acted as the special guest timekeeper of the match while Candice Michelle was the one who gave the sash and crown to Santina.

The next match featured Chris Jericho facing Ricky Steamboat, Jimmy Snuka, and Roddy Piper (who were accompanied to the ring by Ric Flair) in a three-on-one handicap elimination match. Before long, Jericho had caused Snuka to submit the Walls of Jericho. He then pinned Piper after an enzuigiri. Steamboat, however, would outlast his partners as he was able to execute a number of his signature moves including arm drags, chops, and a plancha. Jericho was able to regain control of the match by connecting with the Codebreaker, pinning Steamboat to win the match. After the match, Jericho challenged Mickey Rourke, sitting at ringside, to come into the ring. Rourke finally entered the ring and knocked Jericho onto the canvas with a punch before being commended by Ric Flair.

The fourth bout was the Extreme Rules match between brothers Jeff Hardy and Matt Hardy. This featured a multitude of moments that saw the Hardys assault each other with many different weapon-based attacks, which included assaults with numerous objects under the ring and Jeff splash from the top turnbuckle through a pair of tables, with Matt sandwiched between the two and a chair. Jeff, seeking to end the match, attempted to set up a ladder for him to ascend while he would perform a maneuver similar to a leapfrog over the hurdle, and diving down in a seated position known as a leapfrog leg drop, ultimately missing his target, due to Matt's last-minute dodge, which resulted in Matt gaining the advantage over his brother. He then forced Jeff's head in between the seat and back of a steel chair, then executed the Twist of Fate with Jeff's head in the chair to win the match via pinfall.

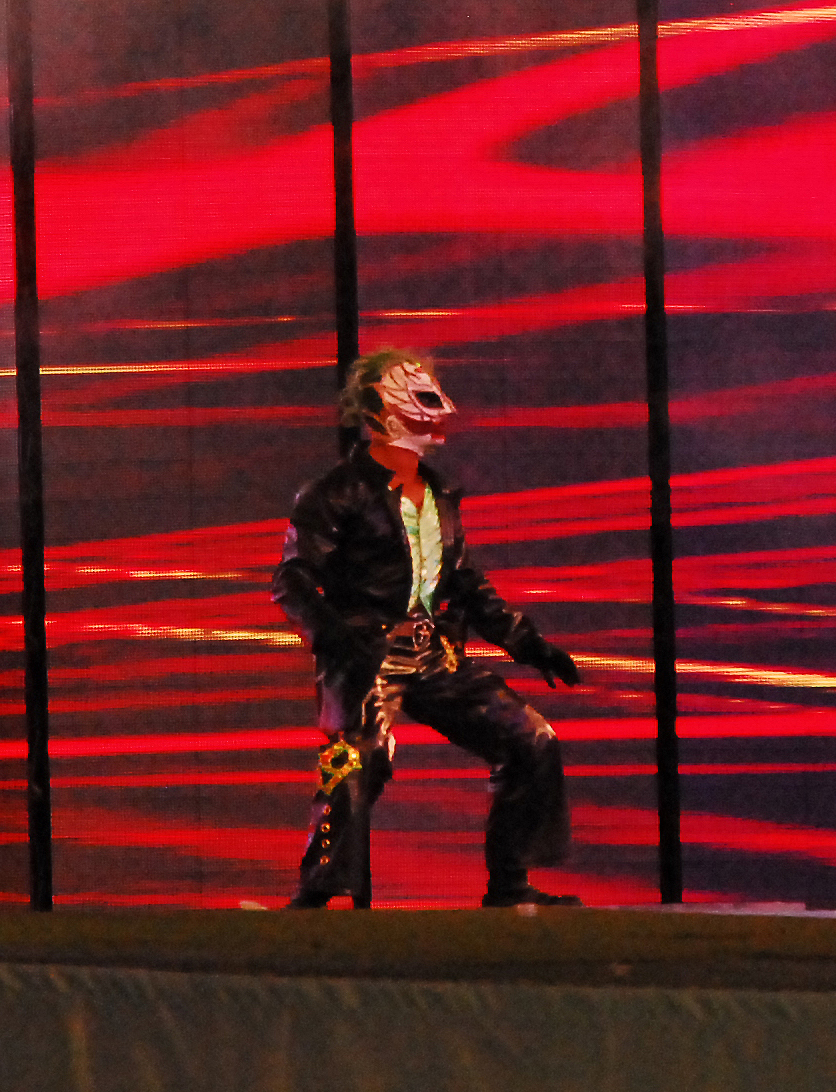
Rey Mysterio, dressed as The Joker for WrestleMania, faced John "Bradshaw" Layfield (JBL) for Raw's Intercontinental Championship.

A singles match for the Intercontinental Championship was next, in which Rey Mysterio faced defending champion John "Bradshaw" Layfield (JBL). Before the match started, JBL kicked Mysterio and punched him down to the ground for a few seconds. But once the referee started the match, Mysterio surprised JBL by quickly executing the 619 before pinning him for a win via pinfall in 22 seconds. Following the match, a frustrated JBL grabbed a microphone and proclaimed, "I quit!". This has been JBL's last singles match as an active performer. The match marked the first time since WrestleMania X8 that the Intercontinental Championship has been defended at a WrestleMania event.

=== Main event matches ===
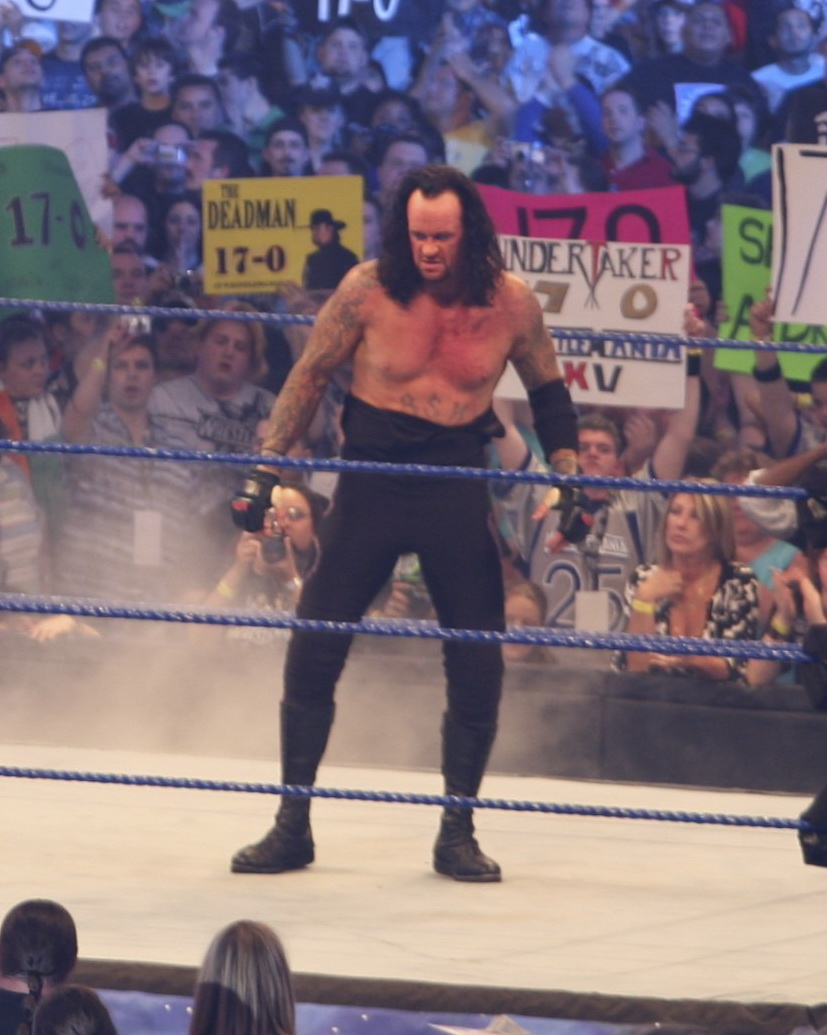
The Undertaker, after defeating Shawn Michaels to extend his undefeated WrestleMania streak to 17–0

The next match pitted The Undertaker against Shawn Michaels. Michaels made his entrance descending on a platform to symbolize the light; in sharp contrast, The Undertaker entered second, ascending from the floor with fire shooting up from the stage. The match began with a fast pace by both men going for strikes to have them countered before Michaels feigned a knee injury to gain the advantage, and the pace slowed. This led to an exchange of signature moves and submission holds, which saw Michaels escape The Undertaker's Hell's Gate and dodge multiple attempts at the chokeslam while The Undertaker blocked attempts at Michaels' Sweet Chin Music. The action went to the outside of the ring with Michaels attempting a moonsault, only to have The Undertaker avoid the attempt. This led to The Undertaker attempting a suicide dive over the top rope, only to have Michaels pull the nearby cameraman (played by Sim Snuka) into The Undertaker. The spot, however, did not go as intended. The idea was for Michaels to push the referee out of the way, and pull Snuka into the path of Undertaker and for Snuka to catch The Undertaker before he hit the ground. However, Snuka was standing too far back and Undertaker landed almost head first on the protective mats surrounding the ring. He remained on the floor of the arena for some time, while Michaels revived the referee, rolling him back into the ring and having the referee start to count out The Undertaker. The referee began to count as The Undertaker started to revive, and when the official got to the count of 9, The Undertaker rolled into the ring, managing to beat the count of 10. The match continued with both men performing all of their respective finishing moves. The Undertaker executed the Last Ride and chokeslam, Michaels executed Sweet Chin Music twice and The Undertaker executed a Tombstone Piledriver on Michaels – all of which scored near-falls. The Undertaker won the match after Michaels attempted another moonsault only to be caught in mid-air, and landed into another Tombstone Piledriver. As a result of this victory, The Undertaker remained undefeated at WrestleMania, extending his record to 17–0. Throughout the match, fans were split, chanting for both superstars, and at one point chanted "This is awesome", referring to the match itself.

The World Heavyweight Championship was contested for in a Triple Threat match between the champion, Edge, Big Show, and John Cena, who entered through an aisle of look-alikes to start the match; Vickie Guerrero was brought out to ringside in a wheelchair by Chavo Guerrero due to her emotional investment in both Edge and Big Show. The action began with some brawling and some early teamwork from Big Show and Edge before their alliance crumbled. The match spilled to the outside seeing Edge spear Big Show through the guardrail. Cena returned Edge to the ring before applying the STF before Big Show came to his senses, and broke up the action, leading to Cena and Edge teaming up to remove Big Show from the equation before turning on each other. Cena won the match by lifting both Big Show and Edge at the same exact time and set up the Attitude Adjustment on Big Show, then dropping Edge onto Big Show with the same move before pinning Big Show to win his second World Heavyweight Championship.

Next after that, the 2009 WWE Hall of Fame class was introduced in this order by Justin Roberts: Terry and Dory Funk Jr., "Cowboy" Bill Watts, Howard Finkel, Koko B. Ware, the Von Erich family (represented by Kevin Von Erich), Ricky "The Dragon" Steamboat, and Stone Cold Steve Austin. After the introductions were made, Austin drove to ringside and all around the ring in an ATV, and toasted the fans with beer.

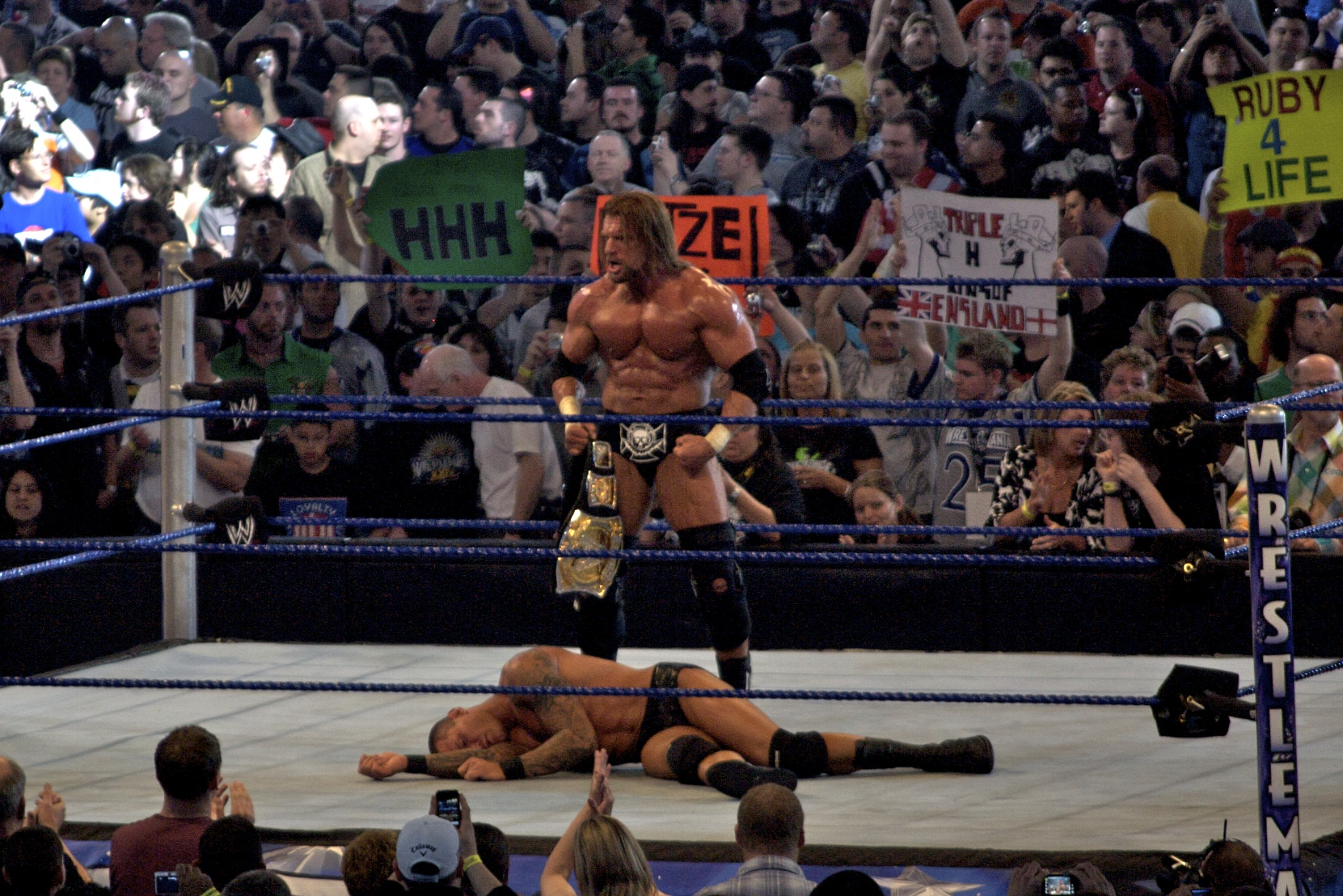
Triple H after retaining SmackDown's WWE Championship against Randy Orton

The last match of the event was for the WWE Championship; the match was contested between the champion, Triple H, and Randy Orton. As per a pre-match stipulation by Vickie Guerrero, if Triple H had been disqualified or had been counted out during the match, he would have lost the title to Orton. Triple H had his signature weapon, the sledgehammer, in hand only to relinquish it prior to entering the ring by throwing it through a glass wall. Early in the match, Triple H did everything in his power to hurt Orton without being disqualified in the process. Orton performed a Back Body Drop to Triple H onto the Spanish announce table. At one point, Orton threw Triple H to a turnbuckle where the referee was standing, causing him to collide, and knocked out the referee. After executing an RKO on Triple H, Orton tried to gain more advantage and went out of the ring to pick up Triple H's signature weapon, the sledgehammer. As Orton made his way back to the ring, Triple H delivered a punt kick to Orton. Triple H took his sledgehammer from Orton, hit him with it and executed the Pedigree to retain the WWE Championship.

== Reception ==
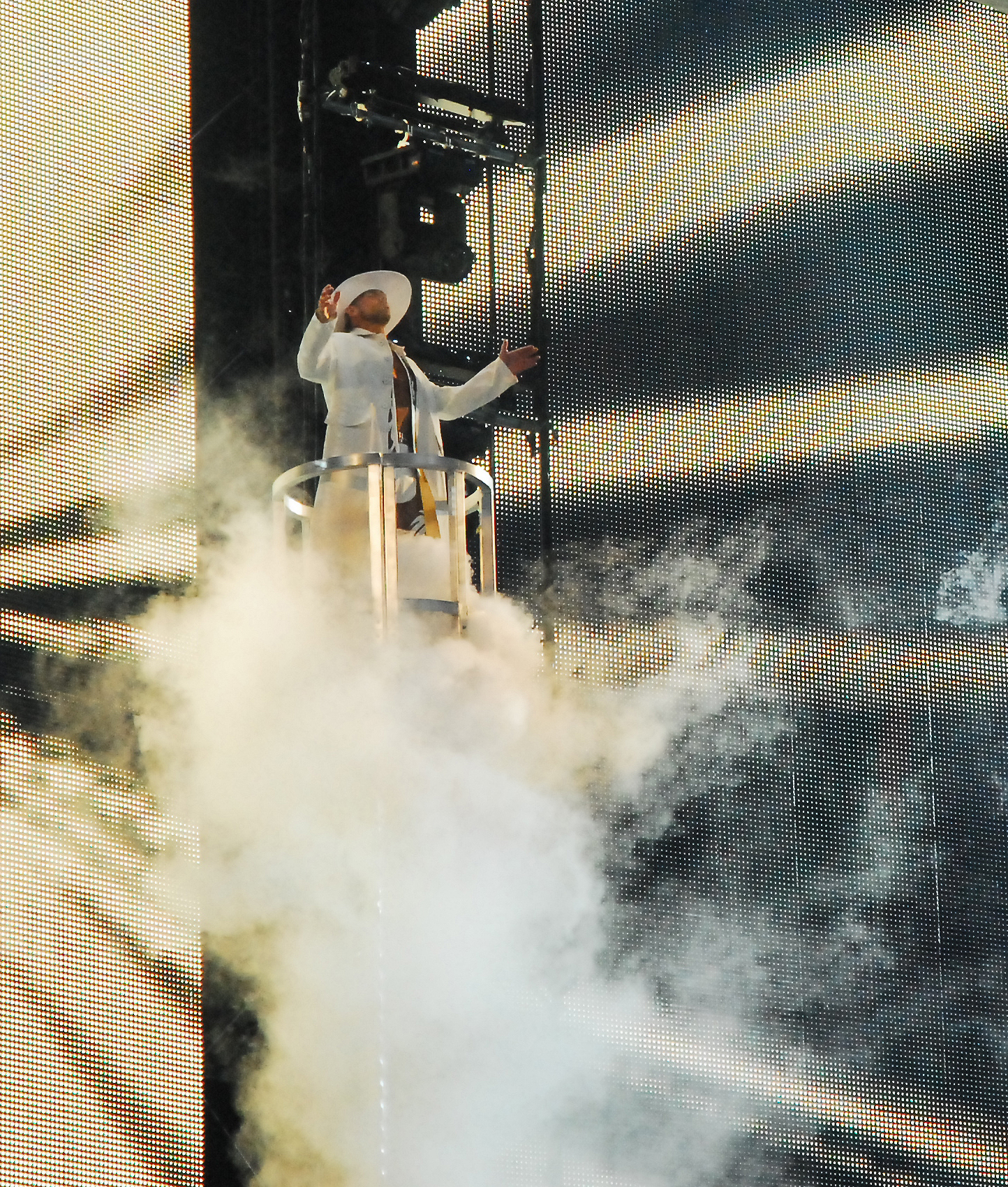
Shawn Michaels, seen entering at WrestleMania 25, would attempt to end The Undertaker's winning streak at the event; the match was acclaimed by critics and is often considered to be one of the greatest matches in professional wrestling history.

WrestleMania 25 received mixed reviews from various sources. Gordon Holmes of Comcast criticized the mini-concert by Kid Rock, stating that "Kid Rock gets ten minutes and The Miz and Morrison don't? Blasphemy!" [sic] He also criticized the 25-Divas Battle Royal which "was a bit of a mess, we didn't even get proper introductions for returning Divas like Sunny, Molly Holly, and Torrie Wilson." Dale Plummer of Canadian Online Explorer's Slam! Sports stated that "the top of this year's card looked an awful lot like last year's. Just swap out Floyd Mayweather Jr. for Shawn Michaels and everyone else was the same." However, he praised the Undertaker vs. Shawn Michaels match by rating it a ten out of ten, his highest rated match. The main event received a seven out of ten. Overall, he rated the event 7.5 out of ten. Wade Keller of the Pro Wrestling Torch Newsletter also criticized Kid Rock's performance, but praised the Undertaker vs. Michaels match. He rated it five out of five, and stated that "the match that deserved to end this show was Taker-Michaels." IGN offered their own review of WrestleMania 25, with IGN TV writer Dan Iverson praising Kofi Kingston, Shawn Michaels, and Ricky Steamboat for their performances, but also criticizing WWE for not showing the Tag Team unification match during the event itself. He finished off the review by stating: "It was just too bad that the potential of the card wasn't lived up to", also giving it an overall rating of seven out of 10. Arash Markazi of Sports Illustrated wrote that Mickey Rourke's appearance "may have been one of the worst executed in WrestleMania history."

The Randy Orton vs. Triple H main event was generally regarded by critics as a disappointing ending to the show. Holmes of Comcast.net believes that the match "never seemed to click" and Kevin Eck of The Baltimore Sun stated that he was "disappointed that it didn’t feel more special after some great angles on TV." Nick Tywalk of Slam! Wrestling wrote that it was "solid and had its share of drama, but the lack of outside interference or plot twists of any kind failed to spark the same feeling of energy Reliant Stadium had in it a few hours before. It was almost a "That's it?" reaction that first came to mind." Wade Keller gave the match 3.75 out of 5. He called the match "good, both well-plotted and well-executed, appropriate to the storyline and feud", but added that "it just wasn't able to follow the classic two matches earlier."

The match between The Undertaker and Shawn Michaels is widely acclaimed, earning the 2009 Match of the Year award from both Pro Wrestling Illustrated and the Wrestling Observer Newsletter, as well as Match of the Year at the 2009 WWE Slammy Awards. Regarded as one of the greatest matches in the history of professional wrestling, Bret Hart called it "one of the best matches I've seen in years", while Triple H, Tony Schiavone, and Shane Taylor have dubbed it the greatest ever, as well as publications such as Bleacher Report. Jim Ross stated he had "never seen a more psychologically compelling match than Shawn and Taker had that night" and Arn Anderson said "If you want to sit down and put up with somebody who's never seen a wrestling match, and you want them to have a favorable impression, show them that match". Dave Meltzer gave the match 4 and 3/4 stars out of 5 but stated that he felt "there was a predictableness to it" which prevented it from being a 5-star match. Undertaker affirmed that both he and Michaels "delivered on every aspect of storytelling and match quality", and Michaels himself called the match "the most perfect, beautiful thing I've ever performed inside a wrestling ring in my life". WWE ranked it at the top of their list of "The 100 best matches to see before you die", as well as ranking it at the top of their list of "50 Greatest WrestleMania matches ever" on their YouTube channel.

== Aftermath ==
=== Raw ===
The rivalry between Triple H and Randy Orton continued after WrestleMania when both men would meet in a six-man tag team match at Backlash on the following episode of Raw. The match would pit Triple H, Shane McMahon and Vince McMahon against The Legacy (Orton with his protégés, Ted DiBiase and Cody Rhodes). Vince's part in the match was later replaced by a returning Batista. At Backlash, Randy Orton and The Legacy defeated Triple H, Shane, and Batista for the WWE Championship. Triple H was put out of action after being punted by Orton after the events of the pay-per-view, while Shane was attacked by Legacy and was taken out on a stretcher. Two months later, Batista later suffered the same fate and was taken out of the building by security, while Triple H made his return and continued his feud with Randy Orton. They would later battle in a Last Man Standing match on Raw for the WWE Championship which went to a no contest, then at The Bash, Randy Orton defeated Triple H in a Three Stages of Hell match, and would later end their feud in a triple threat match at Night of Champions, with Randy Orton retaining his title against both Triple H and John Cena. Orton would then begin a feud with Cena while Triple H would go out to re-unite DX.

On the same episode of Raw, it was announced that Vickie Guerrero would vacate her role as SmackDown general manager to become the new permanent Raw general manager. As her first act, Guerrero announced that John Cena would defend his World Heavyweight Championship at Backlash against Edge in a Last Man Standing match.

=== SmackDown ===
The animosity between Matt and Jeff Hardy continued on the episode of SmackDown following WrestleMania, leading to continued assaults between the two; newly appointed SmackDown general manager, Theodore Long would announce one last match between the two at Backlash, an "I Quit" match.

CM Punk would be drafted to the SmackDown brand, which would see him try on multiple occasions to invoke his contractually guaranteed title match from winning the Money in the Bank ladder match; Punk would be able to get his match at Extreme Rules in June by defeating Jeff Hardy to win the World Heavyweight Championship. Before that, Hardy was involved in a World Heavyweight Championship ladder match with Edge. Hardy had managed to trap Edge between the ladder, climb it, and retrieve the hanging belt. After that, CM Punk cashed in his Money in the Bank contract and performed the GTS twice to win the title.

After the events of WrestleMania, both Shawn Michaels and The Undertaker took a four-month hiatus from WWE. Michaels came back to reform D-Generation X (DX) with Triple H so that they came face to face with The Legacy at SummerSlam. The Undertaker also returned at SummerSlam and attacked the then-World Heavyweight Champion, CM Punk. At the Slammy Awards, The Undertaker and Shawn Michaels won the Best Match of the Year, with Michaels expressing that he was glad that he had created history at WrestleMania, but just when he was about to leave, he challenged the Undertaker to a rematch at the next WrestleMania. The Undertaker later denied the challenge, saying he had nothing more to prove to Michaels, and told Michaels that he would have to earn the spot. Michaels later entered the 2010 Royal Rumble, but would be eliminated by Batista. He later tried to enter the Elimination Chamber match for the WWE Championship, but he was defeated by Randy Orton to earn the spot. Then at the Elimination Chamber pay-per-view, Michaels cost The Undertaker his World Heavyweight Championship. The next night on Raw, The Undertaker accepted the rematch, but only on the condition that Michaels would retire from WWE if he lost. At WrestleMania XXVI, The Undertaker defeated Michaels in a Streak vs. Career Match, thus ending Michaels' career. The next night on Raw, Michaels said farewell to WWE, with his best friend and DX member Triple H right next to him as they spent their last time, together before Michaels finally left the building.

=== ECW ===
WrestleMania 25 was the last WrestleMania to feature the ECW brand, and subsequently the ECW Championship, as the brand was disbanded in February 2010, deactivating the championship along with it.

== Results ==
No.	Results	Stipulations	Times
1^{P}	The Colóns (Carlito and Primo) (WWE) defeated John Morrison and The Miz (World) by pinfall	Lumberjack match to unify the WWE Tag Team Championship and World Tag Team Championship as the Unified WWE Tag Team Championship^{[a]}	8:00
2	CM Punk defeated Christian, Finlay (with Hornswoggle), Kane, Kofi Kingston, Mark Henry (with Tony Atlas), Montel Vontavious Porter and Shelton Benjamin	Money in the Bank ladder match	14:32
3	Santina Marella won by last eliminating Beth Phoenix	"Miss WrestleMania" Battle Royal with Mae Young as special guest timekeeper^{b}	7:25
4	Chris Jericho defeated Jimmy Snuka, Ricky Steamboat, and Roddy Piper (with Ric Flair) by pinfall	Handicap Elimination match	8:33(3:55,4:45 times of elimination)
5	Matt Hardy defeated Jeff Hardy by pinfall	Extreme Rules match	13:38
6	Rey Mysterio defeated John "Bradshaw" Layfield (c) by pinfall	Singles match for the WWE Intercontinental Championship	0:21
7	The Undertaker defeated Shawn Michaels by pinfall	Singles match	30:44
8	John Cena defeated Big Show and Edge (c) (with Vickie Guerrero and Chavo Guerrero) by pinfall	Triple threat match for the World Heavyweight Championship	14:33
9	Triple H (c) defeated Randy Orton by pinfall	Singles match for the WWE Championship; Had Triple H been counted out or disqualified, he would have lost the title.	24:35
(c) / – the champion(s) heading into the match; P / – the match was broadcast on the pre-show

- ^{a} Lumberjacks included The Brian Kendrick, Charlie Haas, Curt Hawkins, Dolph Ziggler, Evan Bourne, Ezekiel Jackson, Hurricane Helms, Goldust, The Great Khali, Jack Swagger, Jamie Noble, Jimmy Wang Yang, JTG, Mike Knox, Paul Burchill, R-Truth, Shad Gaspard, Tommy Dreamer, Vladimir Kozlov, William Regal, and Zack Ryder.
- ^{b} Also in the match were Alicia Fox, Brie Bella, Eve Torres, Gail Kim, Jackie Gayda, Jillian Hall, Joy Giovanni, Katie Lea Burchill, Kelly Kelly, Layla, Maria, Maryse, Melina, Michelle McCool, Mickie James, Molly Holly, Natalya, Nikki Bella, Rosa Mendes, Sunny, Tiffany, Torrie Wilson, and Victoria.
