= Royal Rumble (2010) =

World Wrestling Entertainment pay-per-view event

- Promotional poster featuring various WWE wrestlers
- Promotion: World Wrestling Entertainment
- Brand(s): Raw; SmackDown; ECW
- Date: January 31, 2010
- City: Atlanta, Georgia
- Venue: Philips Arena
- Attendance: 16,697
- Buy rate: 462,000
- Tagline: I Am The One

Pay-per-view chronology
← Previous; TLC: Tables, Ladders & Chairs	Next → Elimination Chamber

Royal Rumble chronology
← Previous; 2009	Next → 2011

The 2010 Royal Rumble was a professional wrestling pay-per-view (PPV) event produced by World Wrestling Entertainment (WWE), held for wrestlers from the promotion's Raw, SmackDown, and ECW brand divisions. It was the 23rd annual Royal Rumble event and took place on January 31, 2010, at the Philips Arena in Atlanta, Georgia. This was the second Royal Rumble at this venue, after 2002.

The event was based around the men's Royal Rumble match, a modified 30-man battle royal in which the participants enter at timed intervals instead of all beginning in the ring at the same time and the winner received a world championship match at WrestleMania. For the 2010 event, the winner received their choice to challenge for either Raw's WWE Championship, SmackDown's World Heavyweight Championship, or the ECW Championship at WrestleMania XXVI.

Six professional wrestling matches were featured on the event's supercard, a scheduling of more than one main event. The main event was the 2010 Royal Rumble match, which featured wrestlers from all three brands. SmackDown's Edge, the 29th entrant, won the match by last eliminating Raw's John Cena, the 19th entrant. The primary match on the Raw brand was for the WWE Championship between reigning champion Sheamus and Randy Orton, which Sheamus won by disqualification. The primary match on the SmackDown brand was between The Undertaker and Rey Mysterio for the World Heavyweight Championship, which The Undertaker won to retain. The featured match on the ECW brand was between Christian and Ezekiel Jackson for the ECW Championship, which Christian won to retain.

This was the last Royal Rumble event in which the ECW Championship was an option for the Royal Rumble match winner as the ECW brand was disbanded in February, deactivating the title along with it, thus also being WWE's last PPV event to include ECW in any capacity.

== Production ==
=== Background ===
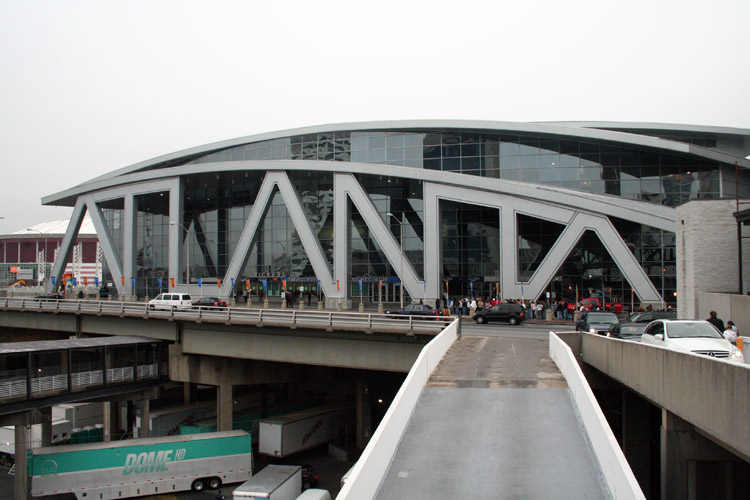
The 23rd annual Royal Rumble was the second time for the event to be held at the Philips Arena in Atlanta, Georgia, after 2002.

The Royal Rumble is an annual professional wrestling event, produced every January by World Wrestling Entertainment (WWE) since 1988; that first event was a television special before it became a pay-per-view (PPV) event beginning in 1989. It is one of the promotion's original four pay-per-views, along with WrestleMania, SummerSlam, and Survivor Series, referred to as the "Big Four". It is named after and centered on the men's Royal Rumble match. The 23rd Royal Rumble event was scheduled to be held on January 31, 2010, at the Philips Arena in Atlanta, Georgia and featured wrestlers from the Raw, SmackDown, and ECW brand divisions. This was the second Royal Rumble at this venue, after 2002.

The Royal Rumble match is a modified battle royal in which the participants enter at timed intervals instead of all beginning in the ring at the same time, and the match generally features 30 wrestlers. Since 1993, the winner earns a world championship match at that year's WrestleMania. For 2010, the winner could choose to challenge for either Raw's WWE Championship, SmackDown's World Heavyweight Championship, or the ECW Championship at WrestleMania XXVI.

=== Storylines ===
The event included matches that resulted from scripted storylines. Results were predetermined by WWE's writers on the Raw, SmackDown, and ECW brands, while storylines were produced on WWE's weekly television shows, Raw, SmackDown, and ECW.

On the December 15, 2009, episode of ECW, general manager Tiffany announced that the ECW brand would host a competition called the "ECW Homecoming", where the winner would face Christian for the ECW Championship at the Royal Rumble. Featuring current and former wrestlers from the ECW brand, the first round of the competition consisted of eight singles matches. The winners would then qualify to the "Homecoming Finale" on the January 12, 2010, episode, where they would fight in an eight-man battle royal that will determine the competition winner. The first two qualifying matches were featured later that night with Ezekiel Jackson defeating Vladimir Kozlov and Kane defeating Zack Ryder. The following week, Jack Swagger returned in a losing effort to Yoshi Tatsu, while Vance Archer advanced with a victory over Goldust. On the December 29 episode, Matt Hardy and Evan Bourne defeated Finlay and Mike Knox, respectively, to qualify. The two remaining qualifying matches were held on the January 5, 2010, episode of and saw Shelton Benjamin defeating Chavo Guerrero Jr. and CM Punk defeating Mark Henry to qualify. On the January 12 episode, Jackson won the "Homecoming Finale", last eliminating Kane, to earn the right to face Christian at the Royal Rumble.

On the January 4 episode of Raw, a fatal four-way match was held to determine the number one contender for WWE United States Championship featuring Montel Vontavious Porter (MVP), Mark Henry, Carlito, and Jack Swagger. MVP emerged victorious by pinning Swagger and earned a match against The Miz for the championship.

It was announced on December 31, 2009, on the company's official website that The Undertaker would be defending the World Heavyweight Championship at the Royal Rumble; the means of determining the challenger was stated to be via the "Beat the Clock Sprint", a series of matches that sees whoever wins their match in the fastest time would be declared the number-one contender. The sprint, held on the January 1, 2010, episode of SmackDown, consisted of four matches involving CM Punk, Kane, Chris Jericho, Rey Mysterio, Dolph Ziggler, R-Truth, Matt Hardy, and Batista. The wrestler who won his match in the quickest time would earn the championship match. Punk defeated Hardy in his match, setting the time at 7:20. The next match featured Kane and Ziggler; both failed to beat the time limit and the match ended in a draw. Mysterio defeated his former rival Jericho one second faster than Punk's time, with 7:19. The final match was Batista versus R-Truth; the match resulted in another time-limit draw, due in part to interference from Mysterio. Despite Mysterio's fastest time, on-screen consultant Vickie Guerrero overruled the result, announcing a match the following week between Mysterio and Batista, who had disputably won his match. The match between the two on the January 8 episode of SmackDown was declared a no contest following both men being incapacitated. A rematch between the two was held the following week, this time as a Steel Cage match. Mysterio won the match, earning the right to face The Undertaker at the Royal Rumble.

The main event for Raw was determined on the January 11 episode with guest host Mike Tyson announcing the winner of a triple threat match later that night between John Cena, Kofi Kingston, and Randy Orton would advance to face Sheamus at the Royal Rumble for the WWE Championship. Orton ultimately won with the help of Legacy, who took out Cena and Kingston for him.

Since November of the previous year, WWE Women's Champion Michelle McCool had been relentlessly insulting Mickie James over a perceived weight issue. The two had a match at TLC: Tables, Ladders & Chairs, which saw McCool win, continuing the torment. James confronted McCool on the January 15 episode of SmackDown during a mocking monologue about James, leading to the champion assaulting her. It was also confirmed that day that McCool would defend her title again at the Royal Rumble against James.

== Event ==
Other on-screen personnel
Role:	Name:
English Commentators	Michael Cole (Raw)
English Commentators	Jerry Lawler (Raw)
English Commentators	Matt Striker (SmackDown)
Spanish Commentators	Carlos Cabrera
Spanish Commentators	Hugo Savinovich
Ring announcers	Tony Chimel (SmackDown)
Ring announcers	Justin Roberts (Raw)
Ring announcers	Savannah (ECW)
Backstage interviewer	Josh Mathews
Referees	Charles Robinson
Referees	Mike Chioda
Referees	John Cone
Referees	Jack Doan
Referees	Aaron Mahoney
Referees	Chad Patton

=== Dark match ===
Before the event aired live on pay-per-view, a dark match took place in which Gail Kim, Kelly Kelly, Eve Torres, and The Bella Twins (Nikki Bella and Brie Bella) defeated Maryse, Katie Lea Burchill, Jillian Hall, Alicia Fox, and Natalya in a 10-Diva tag team match.

=== Preliminary matches ===
The event opened with Christian defending the ECW Championship against Ezekiel Jackson (accompanied by William Regal). Regal attempted to interfere but the referee noticed, ejecting Regal from ringside. Christian executed the Killswitch on Jackson to retain the title.

Next, The Miz defended the WWE United States Championship against Montel Vontavious Porter (MVP), a match that Theodore Long booked in a backstage segment. After MVP chased Miz into the ring, Miz pinned him with a small package to retain the title.

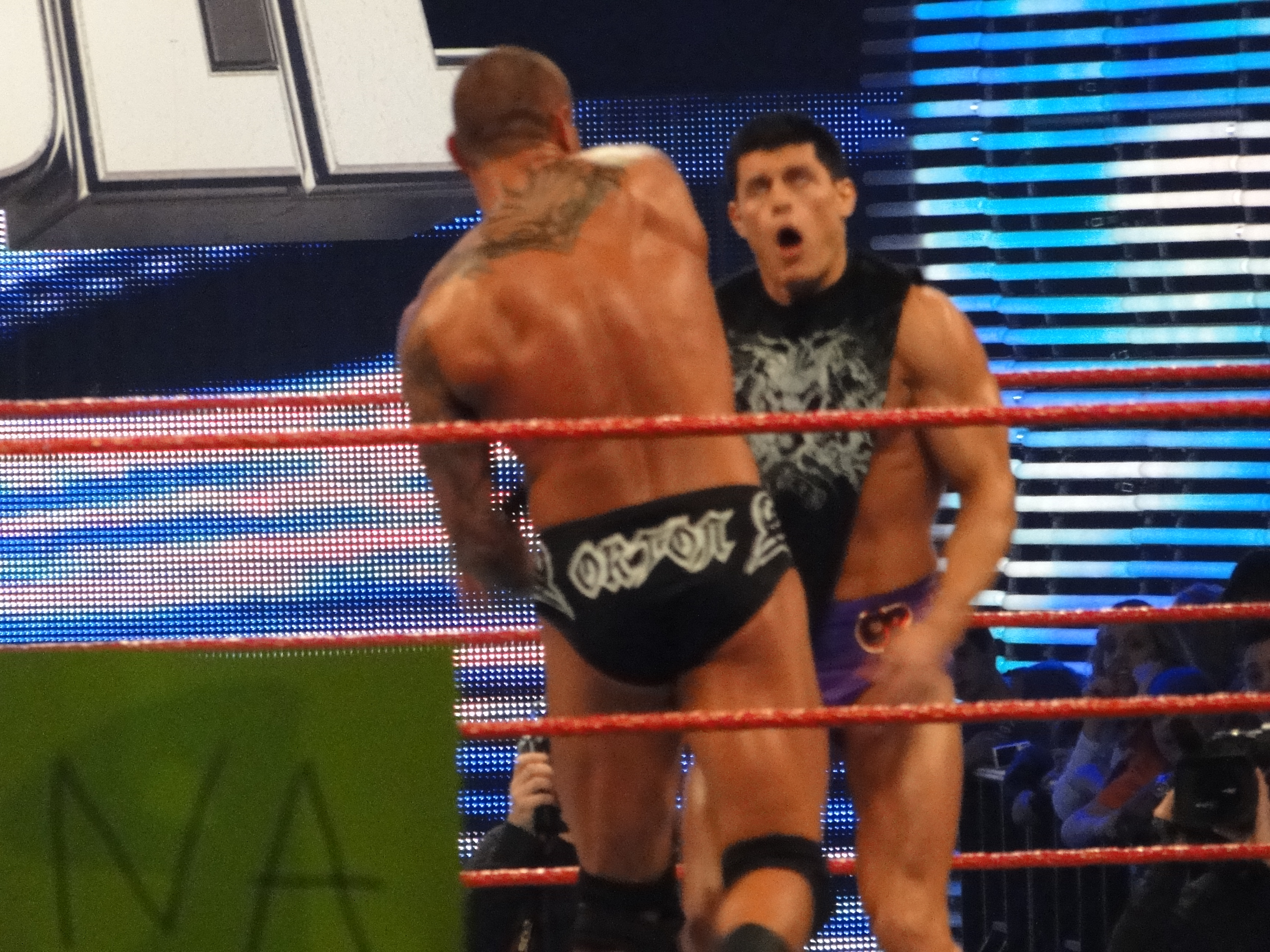
Randy Orton attacking Cody Rhodes, after Rhodes' interference resulted in Orton being disqualified during his WWE Championship match.

After that, Sheamus defended the WWE Championship against Randy Orton. Sheamus dominated most of the match, targeting Orton's left arm. Sheamus attempted Pale Justice on Orton but Orton countered the move with a Rope Hung DDT. Orton pinned Sheamus but Sheamus touched the bottom rope, voiding the pinfall. Orton attempted a punt on Sheamus but Sheamus countered and targeted Orton's left arm. Cody Rhodes interfered and attacked Sheamus, meaning Sheamus retained the title by disqualification. After the match, Orton confronted and attacked Rhodes. Ted DiBiase came out but was also attacked by Orton. Sheamus attacked Orton with a Brogue Kick and celebrated his victory.

Next, Michelle McCool defended the WWE Women's Championship against Mickie James. McCool was accompanied by Layla. Before the match began, McCool taunted James by calling her "Piggy James" and Layla wore a fat suit to mock James. As the match started, "Piggy James" Layla tried to attack the genuine James but McCool accidentally executed a Big Boot on Layla. James took advantage and executed a Mickie DDT to win the title.

In the penultimate match, The Undertaker defended the World Heavyweight Championship against Rey Mysterio. After countering a Last Ride, Mysterio executed two 619s on Undertaker. Mysterio attempted a West Coast Pop but Undertaker caught Mysterio and executed a Last Ride to retain the title.

=== Main event ===
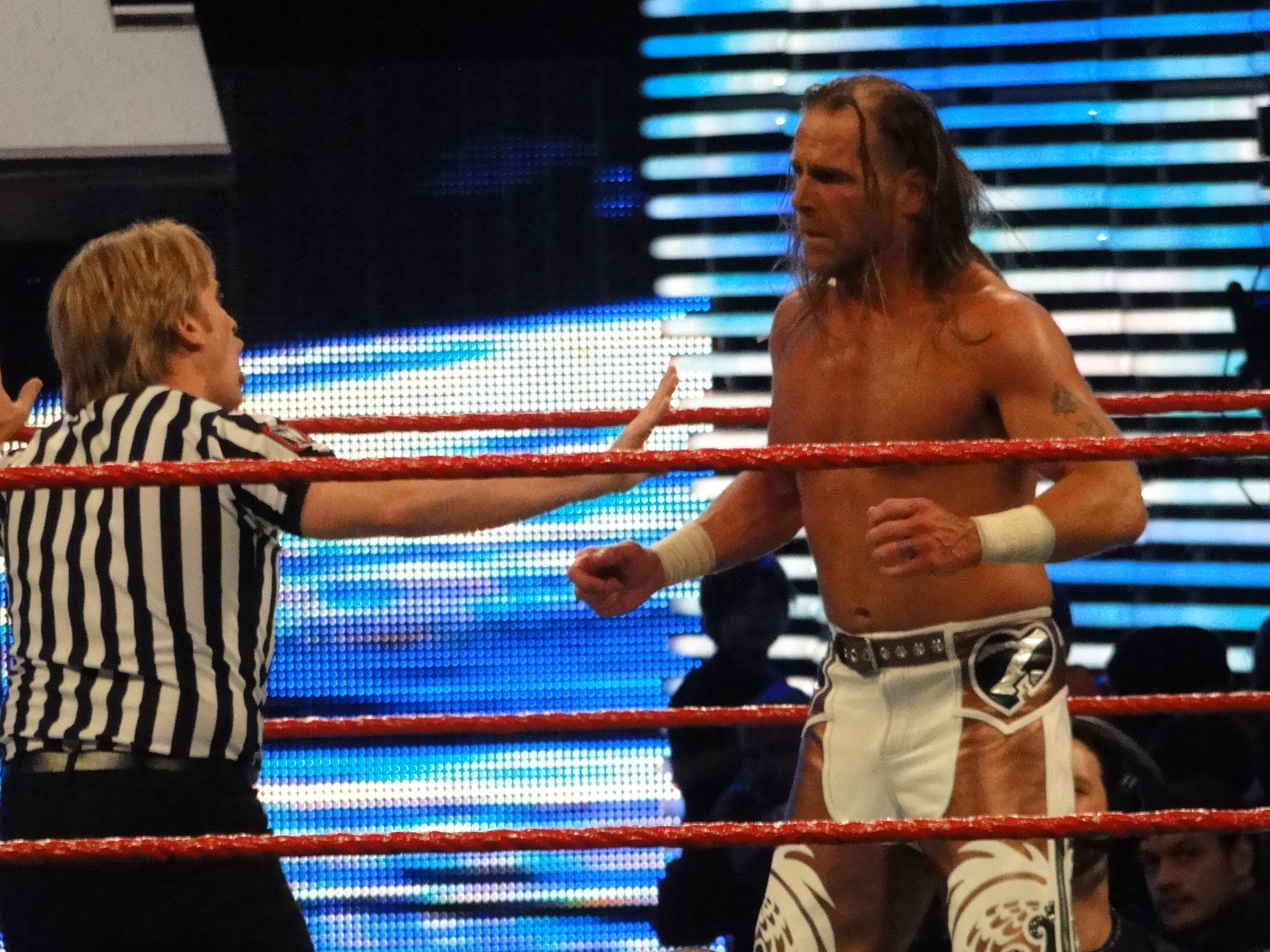
Shawn Michaels after he was eliminated from the Royal Rumble match.

The main event was the Royal Rumble match for a world championship match at WrestleMania XXVI. Dolph Ziggler (#1) and Evan Bourne (#2) were quickly eliminated by CM Punk (#3). After eliminating both men, Punk began talking on the microphone, boasting of his intention to win, carrying this on for all of his time in the match. Punk quickly eliminated JTG (#4), before being stopped by The Great Khali (#5). Beth Phoenix then entered at #6, becoming only the second female to participate in an all-male Royal Rumble, after Chyna did so in 1999. Phoenix eliminated Khali by pulling him over the top rope while kissing him but was eliminated by Punk immediately afterwards. Triple H entered at #8 and eliminated Punk. Montel Vontavious Porter (MVP) (#14) was attacked by The Miz during his ring entrance and taken backstage by medical personnel without entering the match. Miz then entered at #16 but MVP returned to the match and eliminated both himself and Miz. The other half of D-Generation X, Shawn Michaels, entered at #18 and he and Triple H eliminated all the other competitors in the match, leaving themselves. Michaels and Triple H were immediately joined by John Cena (#19). After double-teaming Cena, Michaels performed a Sweet Chin Music on Triple H to eliminate him. A notable moment in the match came when R-Truth (#25) eliminated Big Show (#22) and Mark Henry (#23) at the same time. Chris Jericho entered the ring at #28 and was soon joined by entrant #29, Edge, who was making his return following a six-month hiatus due to injury. Edge performed spears on Jericho, Michaels, and Cena before eliminating Jericho. Dave Batista entered at #30 as the final entrant. This brought the final four down to Michaels, Cena, Edge, and Batista. After all four competitors traded moves on each other, Batista eliminated Michaels, who tried to rejoin the match but was stopped, resulting in him superkicking a referee before walking to the back frustrated.

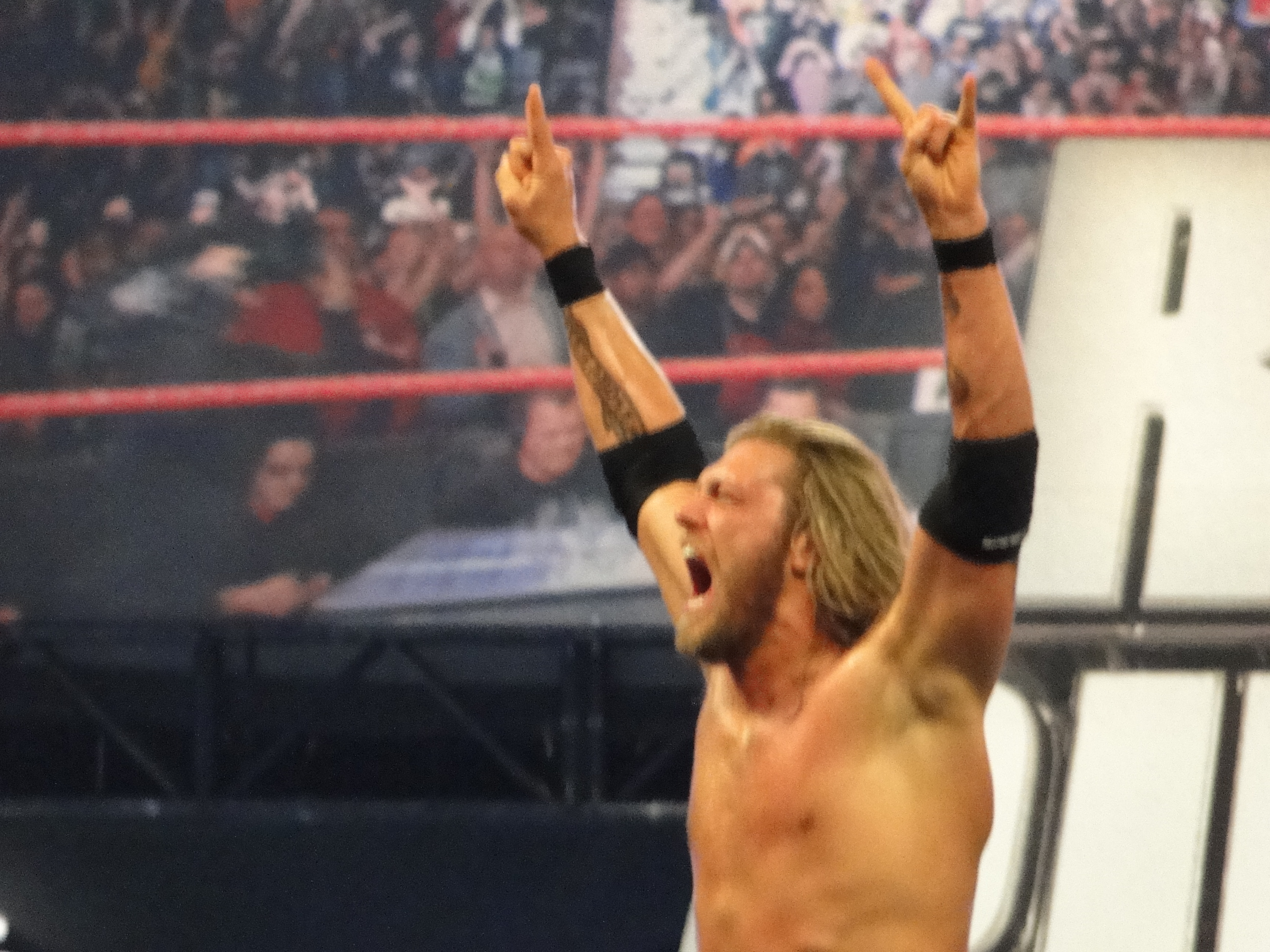
Edge after winning the Royal Rumble match.

After a quick back and forth, Cena eliminated Batista, bringing the final two down to himself and Edge. Cena countered a spear attempt from Edge and went to eliminate him, but Edge instead eliminated Cena to win the match. In doing so, Edge would gain the new record of spending the least amount of time in the rumble match before winning it. He was in the match for 7 minutes and 37 seconds, besting the previous record set by Cena by 51 seconds (Cena's record had been set two years earlier after also returning from injury in the Rumble match as a late entry - in Cena's case, #30). This record lasted for 12 years until it was broken by Brock Lesnar in 2022.

== Reception ==
The Royal Rumble received generally positive reviews from critics. The event earned 462,000 pay-per-view buys, an increase of 12,000 on the 2009 Royal Rumble.

== Aftermath ==
This was the final Royal Rumble held before the original World Tag Team Championship was deactivated in August in favor of the WWE Tag Team Championship; since WrestleMania 25 in April 2009, both titles were held and defended together across all brands as the Unified WWE Tag Team Championship. It would also be the final Royal Rumble held before the original WWE Women's Championship was deactivated in September in favor of the WWE Divas Championship.

=== Raw ===
After failing to win the Royal Rumble match and losing an Elimination Chamber qualifying match to Randy Orton, Shawn Michaels cost The Undertaker the World Heavyweight Championship against Chris Jericho in the SmackDown Elimination Chamber match at Elimination Chamber. As a result, Michaels challenged Undertaker to a rematch of their WrestleMania XXV match at WrestleMania XXVI. Undertaker agreed on the term that if Michaels lost, he would retire from professional wrestling. A stipulation was added that the match would be contested under no disqualifications and no countouts. At WrestleMania, Undertaker defeated Michaels to extend his WrestleMania winning streak to 18–0 and Michaels was forced to retire.

John Cena eliminated Batista from the Royal Rumble match, which started a conflict between Batista and Cena. On the February 1 episode of Raw, Cena rescued Bret Hart from an assault by Batista and Vince McMahon. After the show ended, Cena tried to help Hart but was attacked by Batista. At Elimination Chamber, Cena won the WWE Championship from Sheamus in an Elimination Chamber match. After the match, McMahon ordered Cena to defend the title against Batista. Batista defeated Cena to win the WWE Championship. At WrestleMania XXVI, Cena defeated Batista to regain the WWE Championship. Cena would retain the title against Batista in a Last Man Standing match at Extreme Rules and in an "I Quit" match at Over the Limit, which forced Batista to quit WWE.

=== SmackDown ===
As a result of winning the 2010 Royal Rumble match, Edge earned the opportunity to wrestle for a world championship of his choosing at WrestleMania XXVI. After Chris Jericho won the World Heavyweight Championship from The Undertaker in an Elimination Chamber match at Elimination Chamber, Edge announced that he would wrestle Jericho for the title—Edge had shared the Unified WWE Tag Team Championship with Jericho the time of his injury the prior year. At WrestleMania, Jericho defeated Edge to retain the title. After the match, Edge would be frustrated, spearing Chris Jericho through the barricade in the process at ringside. The rivalry ended after Edge defeated Jericho in a Steel Cage match at Extreme Rules.

=== ECW ===
After the Royal Rumble, Christian and Ezekiel Jackson continued to feud over the ECW Championship. On February 2, however, WWE Chairman Vince McMahon announced that ECW would be going off the air and would air its final episode on February 16. On the final episode of ECW, Jackson, with the help of William Regal, defeated Christian in an Extreme Rules match to become the final ECW Champion. Afterwards, the ECW brand was discontinued, subsequently retiring the championship. This would in turn be the last Royal Rumble in which three titles were an option for the Royal Rumble winner (with the one-time exception of 2020).

== Results ==
No.	Results	Stipulations	Times
1^{D}	The Bella Twins (Brie Bella and Nikki Bella), Eve Torres, Gail Kim, and Kelly Kelly defeated Alicia Fox, Jillian Hall, Katie Lea Burchill, Maryse, and Natalya by pinfall	10-Diva tag team match	—
2	Christian (c) defeated Ezekiel Jackson (with William Regal) by pinfall	Singles match for the ECW Championship	11:49
3	The Miz (c) defeated Montel Vontavious Porter by pinfall	Singles match for the WWE United States Championship	7:30
4	Sheamus (c) defeated Randy Orton by disqualification	Singles match for the WWE Championship	11:24
5	Mickie James defeated Michelle McCool (c) (with Layla) by pinfall	Singles match for the WWE Women's Championship	0:20
6	The Undertaker (c) defeated Rey Mysterio by pinfall	Singles match for the World Heavyweight Championship	11:09
7	Edge won by last eliminating John Cena	30-man Royal Rumble match for a world championship match at WrestleMania XXVI	49:24
(c) / – the champion(s) heading into the match; D / – this was a dark match

=== Royal Rumble entrances and eliminations ===
– Raw
– SmackDown
– ECW
– Winner

Draw	Entrant	Brand	Order	Eliminated by	Time	Eliminations
1	Dolph Ziggler	SmackDown	2	CM Punk	02:29	0
2	Evan Bourne	Raw	1	CM Punk	02:26	0
3	CM Punk	SmackDown	7	Triple H	10:04	5
4	JTG	SmackDown	3	CM Punk	00:25	0
5	The Great Khali	SmackDown	4	Beth Phoenix	01:37	0
6	Beth Phoenix	SmackDown	5	CM Punk	01:39	1
7	Zack Ryder	ECW	6	CM Punk	00:32	0
8	Triple H	Raw	17	Shawn Michaels	17:55	3
9	Drew McIntyre	SmackDown	16	Shawn Michaels & Triple H	14:43	0
10	Ted DiBiase	Raw	14	Shawn Michaels	13:40	0
11	John Morrison	SmackDown	15	Shawn Michaels	11:37	0
12	Kane	SmackDown	11	Triple H	08:59	1
13	Cody Rhodes	Raw	13	Shawn Michaels	08:54	0
14	Montel Vontavious Porter	Raw	8	Himself^{1}	00:07	1
15	Carlito	Raw	12	Shawn Michaels	05:09	0
16	The Miz	Raw	9	Montel Vontavious Porter^{1}	00:17	0
17	Matt Hardy	SmackDown	10	Kane	00:20	0
18	Shawn Michaels	Raw	27	Batista	23:45	6
19	John Cena	Raw	29	Edge	27:11	4
20	Shelton Benjamin	ECW	18	John Cena	00:48	0
21	Yoshi Tatsu	ECW	19	John Cena	00:29	0
22	Big Show	Raw	22	R-Truth	05:04	1
23	Mark Henry	Raw	21	R-Truth	03:09	0
24	Chris Masters	Raw	20	Big Show	00:29	0
25	R-Truth	SmackDown	24	Kofi Kingston	04:22	2
26	Jack Swagger	Raw	23	Kofi Kingston	02:06	0
27	Kofi Kingston	Raw	25	John Cena	03:09	2
28	Chris Jericho	SmackDown	26	Edge	02:24	0
29	Edge	SmackDown	—	Winner	07:37	2
30	Batista	SmackDown	28	John Cena	05:24	1

- ^{1} – MVP was attacked by The Miz during his entrance, but later entered the match shortly after Miz's entry and eliminated both himself and Miz from the match.

=== ECW Homecoming Tournament ===
The ECW Homecoming Tournament was a tournament held to determine Christian's challenger for the ECW Championship at the Royal Rumble on January 31, 2010.

No.	Results	Stipulations	Times
1	Kane defeated Zack Ryder	Qualifying match	03:47
2	Ezekiel Jackson defeated Vladimir Kozlov	Qualifying match	01:35
3	Yoshi Tatsu defeated Jack Swagger	Qualifying match	14:46
4	Vance Archer defeated Goldust	Qualifying match	02:51
5	Matt Hardy defeated Finlay	Qualifying match	05:14
6	Evan Bourne defeated Mike Knox	Qualifying match	03:43
7	Shelton Benjamin defeated Chavo Guerrero	Qualifying match	04:46
8	CM Punk defeated Mark Henry	Qualifying match	10:37
9	Ezekiel Jackson defeated Kane, Yoshi Tatsu, Vance Archer, Matt Hardy, Evan Bourne, Shelton Benjamin and CM Punk (Note: Order of elimination: Evan Bourne, Vance Archer, Shelton Benjamin, Matt Hardy, CM Punk, Yoshi Tatsu, Kane)	8-man battle royal to determine the #1 contender for the ECW Championship at the Royal Rumble.	13:53
