= Amen (Kid Rock song) =

Single by Kid Rock

from the album Rock N Roll Jesus
- Released: November 5, 2007
- Studio: Allen Roadhouse
- Genre: Rock
- Length: 4:40
- Label: Atlantic
- Songwriter: Robert James Ritchie
- Producer: Kid Rock with Rob Cavallo

Kid Rock singles chronology
"Rock Star" (2007)	"Amen" (2007)	"All Summer Long" (2008)

Music video
- "Amen" on YouTube

"Amen" is the second single from American singer Kid Rock's album Rock n Roll Jesus. Kid Rock says that this is the greatest song he has ever written. The acoustic guitar intro samples the Bob Seger song "You'll Accomp'ny Me". It is an acoustic arranged song that touches on such subjects as poverty, war, race relations, corrupt politicians and hypocritical pastors. The song features the gospel choir, The Fisk Jubilee Singers. It was released to radio November 5, 2007. It peaked at #11 on the Billboard Mainstream Rock Tracks chart and #27 on the Billboard Modern Rock Tracks chart. Photographer David Tunnley, who has a Pulitzer Prize to his credit, directed the music video.

== Music video ==
There were two music videos made; the first one was done by a fan, Robert Hamilton (also known as ChicagoTransAm on YouTube) and he was then asked by the producers from RefusedTV/SargantHouse for input on the final video. Contrary to popular belief, there was only one official video ever produced. The earlier was just a concept from Hamilton which was then used as the general statement the official video would portray.

== Charts ==
Chart (2007)	Peak position
U.S. Billboard Mainstream Rock Tracks	11
U.S. Billboard Modern Rock Tracks	27
