= Roll On (Kid Rock song) =

Single by Kid Rock

from the album Rock n Roll Jesus
- Released: September 23, 2008
- Studio: Allen Roadhouse
- Genre: Heartland rock
- Length: 6:12
- Label: Atlantic, Top Dog
- Songwriter: Robert James Ritchie
- Producer: Kid Rock with Rob Cavallo

Kid Rock singles chronology
"All Summer Long" (2008)	"Roll On" (2008)	"Rock n Roll Jesus" (2008)

Music video
- "Roll On" on YouTube

"Roll On" is the fourth single from Kid Rock's triple-platinum album Rock n Roll Jesus. It was shipped to radio on September 23, 2008. The song failed to chart in the United States. In Germany it peaked at No. 59. The video of the song was very successful on the VH1 weekly Top 20 countdown, peaking at No. 4.

== Track listings ==
1. Roll On
2. Rock N Roll Pain Train
3. Cocky (UK Single)

== Content ==
The song deals with Kid Rock coming to terms with himself aging and talks of enjoying the time he has left with his family. It is an acoustic country ballad with gospel vocals provided by Jessica Wagner. The song also includes a saxophone solo by David McMurray.

== Critical reception ==
Billboard described the song as "a soulful high-water mark", and it has also been described as "Motown-influenced".

== Music video ==
The music video was shot for it in August 2008 in Detroit, including at the Motown Historical Museum. The video features landmarks such as Tiger Stadium, Comerica Park, Lafayette Coney Island and the Uniroyal Giant Tire near Interstate 94. Kid Rock said, with respect to the video, that he "really wanted to capture the heart and soul of Detroit."

== Chart performance ==
Chart (2008)	Peak position
Germany (GfK)	59
Hungary (Editors' Choice Top 40)	32
