= Royal Rumble (2009) =

World Wrestling Entertainment pay-per-view event

- Promotional poster featuring various WWE wrestlers
- Promotion: World Wrestling Entertainment
- Brand(s): Raw; SmackDown; ECW
- Date: January 25, 2009
- City: Detroit, Michigan
- Venue: Joe Louis Arena
- Attendance: 16,685
- Buy rate: 450,000

Pay-per-view chronology
← Previous; Armageddon	Next → No Way Out

Royal Rumble chronology
← Previous; 2008	Next → 2010

The 2009 Royal Rumble was a professional wrestling pay-per-view (PPV) event produced by World Wrestling Entertainment (WWE), held for wrestlers from the promotion's Raw, SmackDown, and ECW brand divisions. It was the 22nd annual Royal Rumble event and took place on January 25, 2009, at the Joe Louis Arena in Detroit, Michigan.

The event was based around the men's Royal Rumble match, a modified 30-man battle royal in which the participants enter at timed intervals instead of all beginning in the ring at the same time and the winner received a world championship match at WrestleMania. For the 2009 event, the winner received their choice to challenge for either Raw's World Heavyweight Championship, SmackDown's WWE Championship, or the ECW Championship at WrestleMania 25.

Five professional wrestling matches were featured on the event's supercard, a scheduling of more than one main event. The main event was the 2009 Royal Rumble match, which featured wrestlers from all three brands. Raw's Randy Orton, the eighth entrant, won the match by last eliminating SmackDown's Triple H, the seventh entrant. The primary match on the Raw brand was John Cena versus John "Bradshaw" Layfield (JBL) for the World Heavyweight Championship, which Cena won to retain. The primary match on the SmackDown brand was a No Disqualification match between Jeff Hardy and Edge for the WWE Championship, which Edge won to win his fourth and last WWE Championship. The predominant match on the ECW brand was between Jack Swagger and Matt Hardy for the ECW Championship, which Swagger won to retain. This event also marked the first appearance of Rob Van Dam in WWE since One Night Stand in June 2007.

== Production ==
=== Background ===
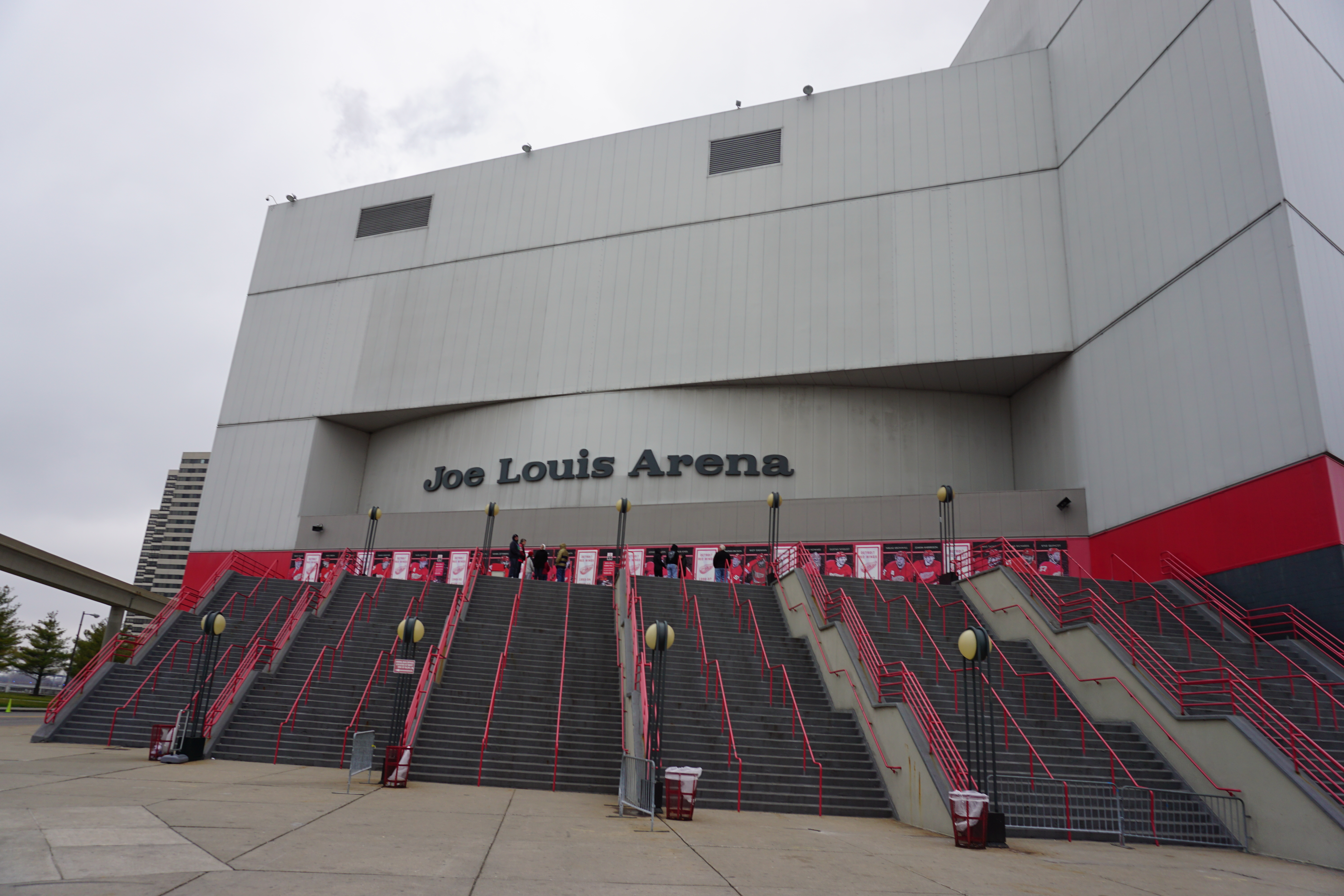
The 22nd annual Royal Rumble event was held at the Joe Louis Arena in Detroit, Michigan.

The Royal Rumble is an annual professional wrestling event, produced every January by World Wrestling Entertainment (WWE) since 1988; that first event was a television special before it became an annual pay-per-view (PPV) beginning in 1989. It is one of the promotion's original four pay-per-views, along with WrestleMania, SummerSlam, and Survivor Series, referred to as the "Big Four". It is named after and centered on the men's Royal Rumble match. The 22nd Royal Rumble event was scheduled to be held on January 25, 2009, at the Joe Louis Arena in Detroit, Michigan and featured wrestlers from the Raw, SmackDown, and ECW brands. Tickets went on sale on November 15, 2008, via Ticketmaster.

The Royal Rumble match is a modified battle royal in which the participants enter at timed intervals instead of all beginning in the ring at the same time, and the match generally features 30 wrestlers. Since 1993, the winner earns a world championship match at that year's WrestleMania. For 2009, the winner could choose to challenge for either Raw's World Heavyweight Championship, SmackDown's WWE Championship, or the ECW Championship at WrestleMania 25.

=== Storylines ===
The event included matches that resulted from scripted storylines. Results were predetermined by WWE's writers on the Raw, SmackDown, and ECW brands, while storylines were produced on WWE's weekly television shows, Raw, SmackDown, and ECW on Sci Fi.

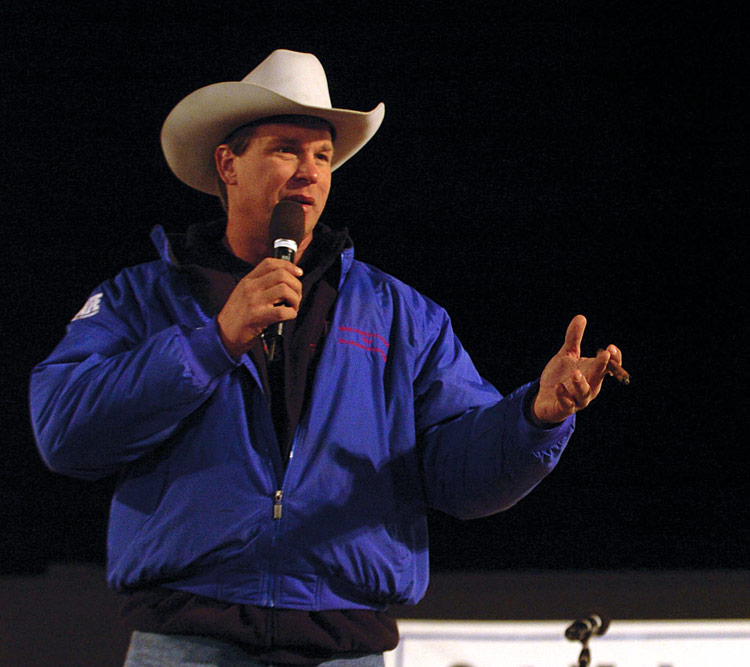
John "Bradshaw" Layfield (JBL), who faced off with John Cena at the Royal Rumble.

The main rivalry from the Raw brand played out between John Cena and John "Bradshaw" Layfield (JBL) over the World Heavyweight Championship. JBL earned his championship match against Cena after winning a fatal four-way elimination match—a standard match in which the last remaining competitor who has not been eliminated is declared the winner—on the December 29, 2008, episode of Raw by defeating Chris Jericho, Randy Orton, and Shawn Michaels.

Another rivalry from the Raw brand came with Melina challenging Beth Phoenix for her WWE Women's Championship in a singles match. Melina won the opportunity to face Phoenix on the December 29, 2008, episode of Raw by winning a battle royal, a match similar to the Royal Rumble, though with fewer competitors.

The main rivalry from the SmackDown brand incorporated into the Royal Rumble featured Jeff Hardy and Edge, with the two feuding over the WWE Championship. At WWE's previous pay-per-view event, Armageddon, Hardy had defeated both defending champion Edge and Triple H in a Triple Threat match, a standard match involving three wrestlers, to win the WWE Championship. On the January 2, 2009, episode of SmackDown, on-air authority figure Vickie Guerrero announced that Edge would face Hardy for the WWE title at the Royal Rumble.

The ECW brand's main rivalry, that between Jack Swagger and Matt Hardy, had the two feuding over the ECW Championship. On the January 13, 2009, episode of ECW on Syfy, Swagger defeated Hardy to capture the ECW Championship. On the January 16 episode of Friday Night SmackDown, WWE announced that Swagger would defend the ECW title against Hardy in a rematch at the Royal Rumble.

== Event ==
Other on-screen personnel
Role:	Name:
English commentators	Michael Cole (Raw)
English commentators	Jerry "The King" Lawler (Raw/Royal Rumble)
English commentators	Jim Ross (Smackdown/Royal Rumble)
English commentators	Tazz (Smackdown)
English commentators	Todd Grisham (ECW)
English commentators	Matt Striker (ECW)
Spanish commentators	Carlos Cabrera
Spanish commentators	Hugo Savinovich
Interviewer	Todd Grisham
Ring announcer	Lilian Garcia (Raw)
Ring announcer	Justin Roberts (SmackDown/Royal Rumble)
Ring announcer	Tony Chimel (ECW)
Referees	Charles Robinson
Referees	Mike Chioda
Referees	Chad Patton
Referees	Marty Elias
Referees	Jack Doan
Referees	Scott Armstong

=== Preliminary matches ===
The first match of the evening saw Jack Swagger defend the ECW Championship against Matt Hardy. The match started with both wrestlers countering each other's moves until Swagger injured Hardy's left shoulder and then targeted it for the rest of the match. Swagger ultimately defeated Hardy by pinning him after slamming him to the mat with a gutwrench powerbomb. Swagger thus retained the ECW Championship.

The second match involved the WWE Women's Championship, where Beth Phoenix defended her title against Melina. The match ended when Phoenix attempted the Glam Slam on Melina, but Melina countered into a roll-up pin, to win the Women's Championship.

=== Main event matches ===
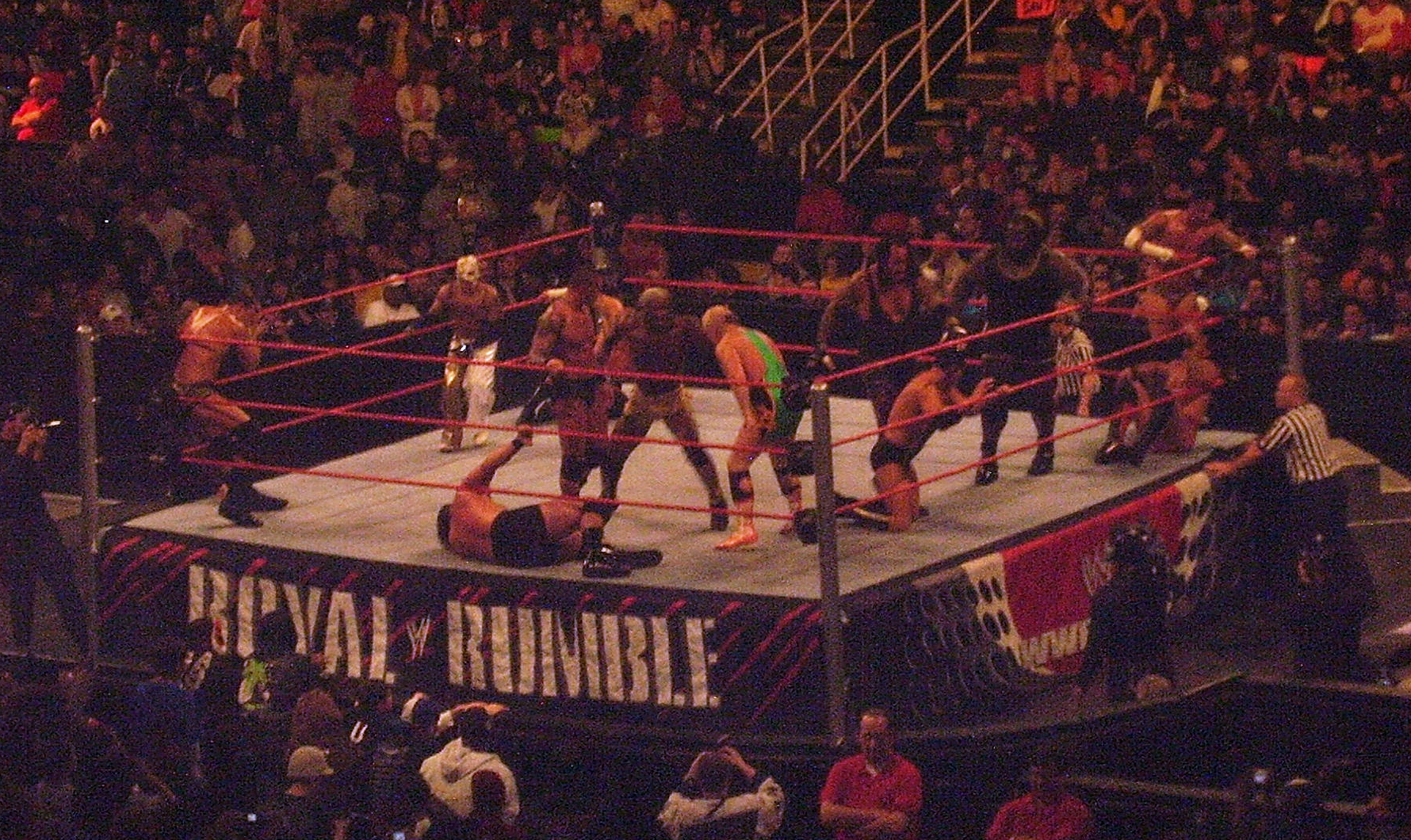
The 2009 Royal Rumble match in progress

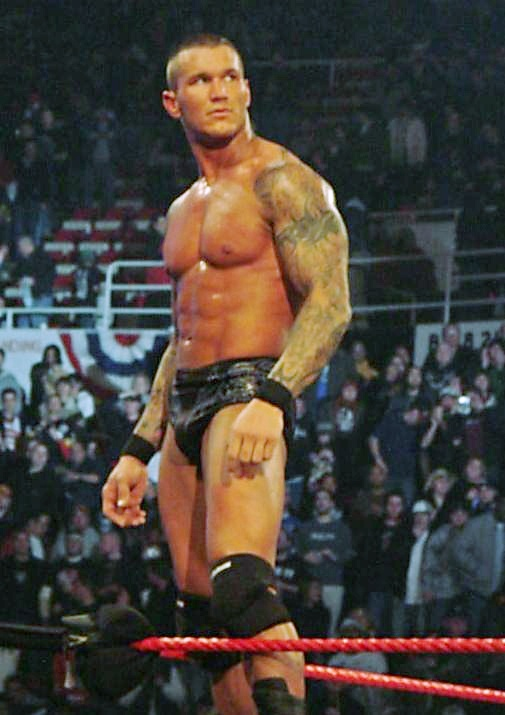
Randy Orton after winning the 2009 Royal Rumble match

The third match on the card pitted John Cena against John "Bradshaw" Layfield (JBL) for the World Heavyweight Championship. JBL's employee Shawn Michaels accompanied him to the ring and first got involved in the match when the referee became incapacitated; he came into the ring and performed his Sweet Chin Music finisher both on JBL and Cena. He then left ringside, leaving JBL's arm on top of Cena. Cena however managed to get a shoulder up and performed an Attitude Adjustment to retain his World Heavyweight Championship.

In the fourth match, Jeff Hardy defended the WWE Championship against Edge. Before the match began, Vickie Guerrero came out and announced the match to be No Disqualifications. Edge then revealed that Chavo Guerrero would be in his corner. During the match Hardy brought a ladder out and set it up near the Spanish announce table. When Chavo tried to interfere, Hardy put him on the table and jumped off the ladder, connecting with Chavo and breaking the table. Hardy then had the match won when he performed the Swanton on Edge after kicking Vickie off the apron when she tried to interfere. When Hardy went for the pin, Vickie stopped referee Scott Armstrong from making a three count. Jeff's brother Matt Hardy then made his way to the ring, placing a chair under Edge's face. Grabbing another chair, Matt at first appeared to be setting Edge up for his own version of Edge's con-chair-to maneuver. He instead hit Jeff in the head with the chair, allowing Edge to then pin Jeff and become the new WWE Champion.

Jim Ross and Jerry Lawler came out to call the main event, which consisted of the Royal Rumble match. Rey Mysterio and John Morrison started the Rumble. As Finlay entered at No. 14, Rey Mysterio stepped on the just eliminated John Morrison and The Miz to avoid elimination. Santino Marella entered at No. 28 and was eliminated by Kane in one second, breaking the Warlord's record for shortest elimination in the Royal Rumble. The final six participants left in the match were Big Show, The Undertaker, Triple H and The Legacy (Cody Rhodes, Ted DiBiase, and Randy Orton). While the Undertaker and Big Show brawled on the outside apron (both went over the top rope, but had not hit the floor), Orton eliminated Big Show with an RKO, causing him to fall off the apron. Big Show eliminated The Undertaker shortly thereafter when he pulled his opponent off the apron by his leg. Despite being at a disadvantage against the Legacy, Triple H eliminated both DiBiase and Rhodes. With Triple H by the ropes, Orton quickly clotheslined him from behind to send him over the top rope and become the winner of the Royal Rumble match.

== Aftermath ==
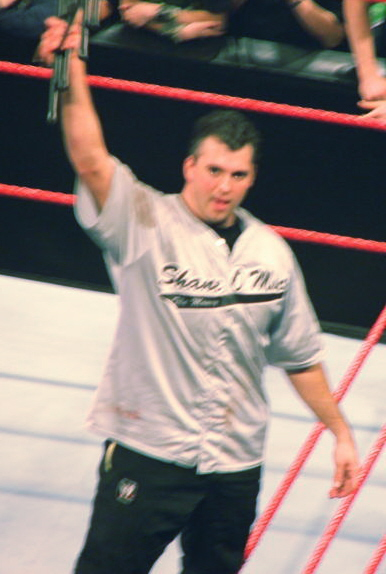
Shane McMahon returned after the Royal Rumble and attacked Randy Orton

=== Raw ===
On the January 26 episode of Raw, The Legacy came out with two lawyers and a therapist. Randy Orton then revealed that he suffers from IED, which causes him to experience violent outbursts when provoked, losing all control of his emotions and actions. According to Orton and his lawyers, Orton had told Stephanie McMahon that if fired, he would not only take DiBiase and Rhodes with him but the whole locker room, as he would bring in a lawsuit against the company.

The Raw brand started the qualifying matches for the brand's upcoming Elimination Chamber match at WWE's next pay-per-view event, No Way Out. Three of the qualifying matches saw Kofi Kingston defeat Kane, Rey Mysterio defeat William Regal and Chris Jericho defeat CM Punk to qualify. In a fourth qualification match, Shawn Michaels failed to win a match against John Cena that would have made JBL eligible to participate in the Elimination Chamber.

=== ECW ===
The ECW Championship feud between Jack Swagger and Matt Hardy had officially finished when ECW's on-air authority figure Theodore Long announced on the January 27 episode of ECW that Hardy had requested a move to the SmackDown brand. Swagger had other problems as his ECW title belt was stolen by Hornswoggle. When Hornswoggle's storyline father, Finlay, urged Hornswoggle to give the title back to Swagger, Swagger shoved Hornswoggle to the ground, which caused Finlay to knock down Swagger with his own championship belt.

=== SmackDown ===
On the January 30 episode of SmackDown, Matt Hardy proclaimed that he had no remorse about smashing his brother Jeff in the head at the Royal Rumble and costing him the WWE Championship. He then told the universe that he no longer considered Jeff a partner or a sibling. There were three Elimination Chamber qualifiers for No Way Out. The first match being The Undertaker versus Mark Henry, which Undertaker won via submission with the Hell's Gate. The second qualifier match was The Big Show defeating Festus with a K.O. Punch. The last qualifier was a triple threat match featuring Triple H, The Great Khali and Vladimir Kozlov. Triple H won the match after he delivered a Pedigree to Khali to pick up the victory.

=== Future ===
During the 2009 WWE Draft, the World Heavyweight Championship and WWE Championship switched brands.

== Results ==
No.	Results	Stipulations	Times
1^{D}	Jimmy Wang Yang defeated Paul Burchill by pinfall	Singles match	—
2	Jack Swagger (c) defeated Matt Hardy by pinfall	Singles match for the ECW Championship	10:27
3	Melina defeated Beth Phoenix (c) (with Santino Marella) by pinfall	Singles match for the WWE Women's Championship	5:56
4	John Cena (c) defeated John "Bradshaw" Layfield (with Shawn Michaels) by pinfall	Singles match for the World Heavyweight Championship	15:29
5	Edge (with Chavo Guerrero) defeated Jeff Hardy (c) by pinfall	No Disqualification match for the WWE Championship	19:23
6	Randy Orton won by last eliminating Triple H	30-man Royal Rumble match for a world championship match at WrestleMania 25	59:37
(c) / – the champion(s) heading into the match; D / – this was a dark match

=== Royal Rumble entrances and eliminations ===
– Raw
– SmackDown!
– ECW
– Legend
– Winner

Draw	Entrant	Brand	Order	Eliminated by	Time	Eliminations
1	Rey Mysterio	Raw	20	Big Show	49:26	1
2	John Morrison	ECW	5	Triple H	19:35	0
3	Carlito	SmackDown	3	Vladimir Kozlov	06:11	0
4	Montel Vontavious Porter	SmackDown	2	Vladimir Kozlov	03:52	0
5	The Great Khali	SmackDown	1	Vladimir Kozlov	01:30	0
6	Vladimir Kozlov	SmackDown	4	Triple H	02:40	3
7	Triple H	SmackDown	29	Randy Orton	50:00	6
8	Randy Orton	Raw	—	Winner	48:30	3
9	JTG	Raw	7	The Undertaker	11:59	0
10	Ted DiBiase Jr.	Raw	27	Triple H	45:11	1
11	Chris Jericho	Raw	23	The Undertaker	37:17	1
12	Mike Knox	Raw	19	Big Show	32:42	0
13	The Miz	ECW	6	Triple H	01:21	0
14	Finlay	ECW	21	Kane	30:00	0
15	Cody Rhodes	Raw	28	Triple H	37:01	2
16	The Undertaker	SmackDown	26	Big Show^{1}	33:30	4
17	Goldust	Raw	8	Cody Rhodes	01:11	0
18	CM Punk	Raw	18	Big Show	22:29	1
19	Mark Henry	ECW	9	The Undertaker & Rey Mysterio	03:14	0
20	Shelton Benjamin	SmackDown	10	The Undertaker	04:17	0
21	William Regal	Raw	11	CM Punk	04:23	0
22	Kofi Kingston	Raw	12	The Brian Kendrick	06:58	0
23	Kane	Raw	24	Cody Rhodes, Randy Orton & Ted DiBiase	18:21	3
24	R-Truth	SmackDown	17	Big Show	12:06	0
25	Rob Van Dam	Unbranded	22	Chris Jericho	14:00	0
26	The Brian Kendrick	SmackDown	13	Triple H	00:15	1
27	Dolph Ziggler	Raw	14	Kane	00:21	0
28	Santino Marella	Raw	15	Kane	00:01	0
29	Jim Duggan	Raw	16	Big Show	02:50	0
30	Big Show	SmackDown	25	Randy Orton	09:32	6

^{1} Big Show's elimination of Undertaker came after Big Show was eliminated by Randy Orton.

=== Race To The Rumble Tournament ===
The Race To The Rumble Tournament was held to determine John Cena's challenger for the World Heavyweight Championship at the Royal Rumble.

Qualifiers; Raw; December 22, 2008
Shawn Michaels	Pinfall
Kane	5:31
Randy Orton	Forfeit
Batista	—
John "Bradshaw" Layfield	Disqualification
Rey Mysterio	12:32
Chris Jericho	Pinfall
CM Punk	14:44

Final; Raw; December 29, 2008
Shawn Michaels	—
Randy Orton	—
John "Bradshaw" Layfield	Pin
Chris Jericho	—

Race To The Rumble Tournament Final elimination table
Elimination	Wrestler	Eliminated by	Method
1	Chris Jericho	Shawn Michaels	Pinned after the Sweet Chin Music
2	Randy Orton	Shawn Michaels	Pinned after the Sweet Chin Music
3	Shawn Michaels	John "Bradshaw" Layfield	Pinned after the Clothesline from Hell
Winner	John "Bradshaw" Layfield	—N/a	
