= So Hott =

Single by Kid Rock

from the album Rock n Roll Jesus
- Released: August 9, 2007
- Studio: Allen Roadhouse
- Genre: Hard rock
- Length: 4:06
- Label: Atlantic, Top Dog
- Songwriters: Robert James Ritchie, Marlon Young
- Producer: Kid Rock with Rob Cavallo

Kid Rock singles chronology
"I Am" (2004)	"So Hott" (2007)	"Rock Star" (2007)

Music video
- "So Hott" on YouTube

"So Hott" is a song by American singer Kid Rock. It was released in August 2007 as the lead single from his seventh studio album Rock n Roll Jesus (2007). The song is about a strong obsession for a woman. The song was his best charting rock song, peaking at number two on the Mainstream Rock Chart and number 13 on the Modern Rock chart. "So Hott" was number 38 on Rolling Stone's list of the 100 Best Songs of 2007. The B-side track to the single was "Guilty" which can be found on the Best Buy version on the album. This was also his first single not to feature Kenny Olson on lead guitar.

It was one of the official theme songs of WrestleMania XXV and was performed at the event in a 5-song medley, with the WWE Divas accompanying Kid Rock to the ring, before the Miss WrestleMania 25-Diva Battle Royal.

A live DVD version was released on a Best Buy exclusive version of the album from Germany's Rock AM Festival from June 8, 2008. It was used during CBS Final Four Coverage in Detroit, Michigan during the 2009 tournament. It was also featured on the TV shows "Californication" and "Dirty Little Secret", as well as ESPN SportsCenter's Ultimate Highlight segment in 2008.

The song appeared in the 2015 comedy A Walk in the Woods, starring Robert Redford and Nick Nolte.

== Track listing ==
1. "So Hott" (Amended Album Version) 4:06
2. "So Hott" (Explicit Album Version) 4:06
3. "Guilty" (on UK single) 2:13

== Charts ==
=== Weekly charts ===
Weekly chart performance for "So Hott"
Chart (2007)	Peak position
Canada Rock (Billboard)	16
US Alternative Airplay (Billboard)	13
US Mainstream Rock (Billboard)	2

=== Year-end charts ===
Year-end chart performance for "So Hott"
Chart (2007)	Position
US Mainstream Rock (Billboard)	24
