= Rock Star (R. Kelly song) =

Single by R. Kelly featuring Ludacris and Kid Rock

from the album Double Up
- B-side: "I Like Love", "I'm a Flirt"
- Released: October 2, 2007 (radio); November 22, 2007 (retail)
- Recorded: 2007
- Genre: Rap rock
- Length: 4:47
- Label: Jive
- Songwriters: R. Kelly, Christopher Bridges
- Producer: R. Kelly

R. Kelly singles chronology
"Same Girl" (2007)	"Rock Star" (2007)	"Speedin'" (2007)

Ludacris singles chronology
"Get Buck in Here" (2007)	"Rock Star" (2007)	"Gimme Dat" (2007)

Kid Rock singles chronology
"So Hott" (2007)	"Rock Star" (2007)	"Amen" (2007)

"Rock Star" is the third single from the R. Kelly album Double Up. The song features Ludacris and Kid Rock. It is notable for its use of the guitar, a distinct departure for the usually R&B–oriented Kelly. The song peaked at number 54 on the Billboard Hot R&B/Hip-Hop Songs chart in its second week.

== Music video ==
The music video, directed by Kelly and Elliot Rosenblaut, was filmed at The Carousel in Lemont, Illinois. It begins with Kelly, Ludacris and Kid Rock on a tour bus, then entering an almost empty bar to play a gig. They set up their instruments and begin to play and the audience get interested in them and come closer. Ludacris is shown rapping at another area of the bar, then Kelly is shown singing to many women dancing in a tour bus. The video ends with the bar full of people cheering and chanting. During the on-stage shots, the rest of the band is portrayed by Chicago rock band Kill Hannah. Cameo appearances from the members of Disturbing tha Peace camp I-20, Bobby Valentino, Lil Fate, Chingy, Small World, Willy Northpole and Playaz Circle, and Boo & Gotti.

== Track listing ==
1. "Rock Star" (featuring Ludacris and Kid Rock)
2. "Same Girl" (featuring Usher)
3. "I'm a Flirt" (Mysto & Pizzi Remix)

== Charts ==
Chart (2007)	Peak position
US Hot R&B/Hip-Hop Songs (Billboard)	54
