= Rock n Roll Jesus (song) =

Single by Kid Rock

from the album Rock n Roll Jesus
- Released: January 2009
- Studio: Allen Roadhouse
- Length: 4:01 (single version); 4:29 (album version)
- Label: Atlantic
- Songwriter(s): Robert J. Ritchie, Marlon R. Young, Ken Tudrick
- Producer(s): Kid Rock with Rob Cavallo

Kid Rock singles chronology
"Roll On" (2008)	"Rock n Roll Jesus" (2009)	"Blue Jeans and a Rosary" (2009)

"Rock n Roll Jesus" is the fifth single from Kid Rock's album of the same name. It is a bravado-laced Kid Rock song about sex, drugs and rock 'n' roll. The song was written by Rock with Ken Tudrick and Marlon Young.

The song along with "All Summer Long" and "Son of Detroit" were featured in the guitar game Power Gig: Rise of the SixString. A live version was released on the Target version of Born Free in 2010.

== Charts ==
Chart (2008)	Peak position
US Mainstream Rock (Billboard)	34
