= Kid Rock discography =

Discography of American musician Kid Rock

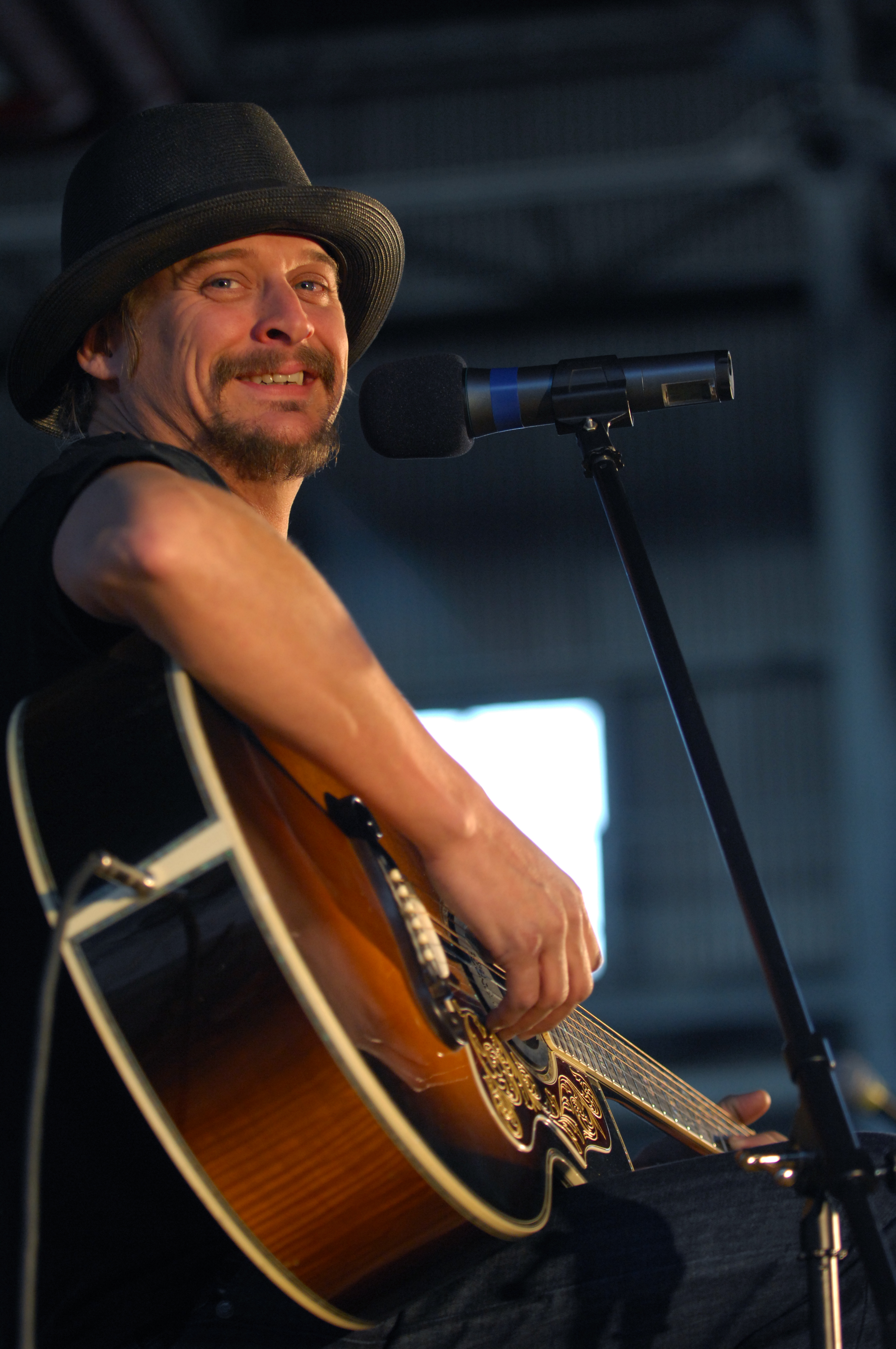
- Kid Rock performing in 2007
- Studio albums: 12
- Extended plays: 3
- Soundtrack albums: 0
- Live albums: 1
- Compilation albums: 2
- Singles: 41
- Music videos: 40

American rock musician Kid Rock has released 13 studio albums, two compilation albums, three extended plays, six bootleg tapes and one live album. His debut album, Grits Sandwiches for Breakfast, was released by Jive Records in 1990. Following its release, Kid Rock was dropped and shuffled between an independent artist and label-signed for most of the 1990s until he created his own Top Dog label and released his mainstream debut album, Devil Without a Cause, on August 18, 1998, via Atlantic Records. The album was certified diamond by the RIAA and sold 11 million copies in the United States. From 1999 to 2000 he produced two major Billboard "Hot 100" hits: "Cowboy" and "Only God Knows Why".

He crossed over to the country charts in 2003 with "Picture", a duet with Sheryl Crow. Cocky was released in 2001 as the follow-up to Devil Without a Cause and sold 5 million copies, followed by 2003's Kid Rock and 2006's Live Trucker. Live Trucker was Kid Rock's first live release, going Gold and selling over 600,000 copies. In 2007, Kid Rock made his comeback with Rock n Roll Jesus, which was certified triple platinum. In 2008, Kid Rock had his biggest hit to date with "All Summer Long". It reached number 1 in eight countries and hit number 23 in the United States. Born Free was released in 2010 and went platinum.

Kid Rock has sold 25 million albums in the US as of December 2013, and over 35 million worldwide.

== Albums ==
=== Studio albums ===
List of studio albums, with selected chart positions and certifications
Title	Album details	Peak chart positions										Certifications
Title	Album details	US	AUS	AUT	CAN	FRA	GER	NLD	NZ	SWI	UK	Certifications
Grits Sandwiches for Breakfast	Released: November 27, 1990; Label: Jive, Top Dog; Formats: CD, CS, digital download	—	—	—	—	—	—	—	—	—	—	
The Polyfuze Method	Released: March 16, 1993; Label: Continuum, Top Dog; Formats: CD, CS	—	—	—	—	—	—	—	—	—	—	
Early Mornin' Stoned Pimp	Released: January 9, 1996; Label: Top Dog; Formats: CD, CS	—	—	—	—	—	—	—	—	—	—	
Devil Without a Cause	Released: August 18, 1998; Label: Lava, Atlantic, Top Dog; Formats: CD, CS, digital download, LP	4	55	28	17	—	82	—	14	—	172	RIAA: 11× Platinum (Diamond); BPI: Silver; MC: 4× Platinum; RIANZ: Gold
Cocky	Released: November 20, 2001; Label: Atlantic, Top Dog; Formats: CD, LP, digital download	3	21	10	15	—	15	—	7	30	137	RIAA: 5× Platinum; MC: 2× Platinum
Kid Rock	Released: November 11, 2003; Label: Atlantic, Top Dog; Formats: CD, digital download	8	—	—	25	—	—	—	—	—	—	RIAA: Platinum; MC: Gold
Rock n Roll Jesus	Released: October 9, 2007; Label: Atlantic, Top Dog; Formats: CD, LP, digital download	1	9	2	4	58	5	19	21	4	4	RIAA: 3× Platinum; ARIA: Gold; BPI: Gold; BVMI: Gold; IFPI AUT: Gold; IFPI SWI: Gold; MC: 2× Platinum; RMNZ: Platinum
Born Free	Released: November 16, 2010; Label: Atlantic, Top Dog; Formats: CD, digital download	5	—	7	11	—	9	—	—	7	139	RIAA: Platinum; MC: Gold
Rebel Soul	Released: November 19, 2012; Label: Atlantic, Top Dog; Formats: CD, digital download	5	—	26	10	—	24	—	—	12	157	RIAA: Gold
First Kiss	Released: February 24, 2015; Label: Warner Bros., Top Dog; Formats: CD, LP, digital download	2	45	9	2	—	16	—	—	5	52	
Sweet Southern Sugar	Released: November 3, 2017; Label: Broken Bow, Top Dog, BMG; Formats: CD, digital download	8	—	64	15	—	88	—	— (Note: Sweet Southern Sugar did not enter the NZ Top 40 Albums Chart, but peaked at number 10 on the NZ Heatseeker Albums Chart.)	43	—	
Bad Reputation	Released: March 21, 2022; Label: Top Dog; Formats: CD, digital download	124	—	—	—	—	—	—	—	—	—	
Halfway 2 Jesus	Released: October 17, 2026; Label: Top Dog; Formats: CD, digital download	— (Note: Halfway 2 Jesus did not enter the Billboard 200, but peaked at number 10 on the Top Christian Albums.)	—	—	—	—	—	—	—	—	—	
"—" denotes a recording that did not chart or was not released in that territory.

=== Live albums ===
List of live albums, with selected chart positions
Title	Album details	Peak chart positions
Title	Album details	US
Live Trucker	Released: February 28, 2006; Label: Atlantic, Top Dog; Formats: CD, digital download	12

=== Compilation albums ===
List of compilation albums, with selected chart positions and certifications
Title	Album details	Peak chart positions					Certifications
Title	Album details	US	AUT	CAN	GER	UK	Certifications
The History of Rock	Released: May 30, 2000; Label: Atlantic, Top Dog; Formats: CD, CS, LP, digital download	2	13	3	15	73	RIAA: 2× Platinum; BPI: Silver; MC: 2× Platinum
Greatest Hits: You Never Saw Coming	Released: September 21, 2018; Label: Warner Bros., Top Dog; Formats: CD, digital download	51	—	—	—	—	

== Extended plays ==
List of extended plays, with selected chart positions
Title	EP details	Peak chart positions
Title	EP details	US
Your Mama Presents Kid Rock's Triple Maxi Pad 12"	Released: February 16, 1990; Label: Jive, Top Dog; Formats: LP, CS, CD, digital download	—
Fire It Up	Released: December 1, 1993; Label: Continuum, Top Dog; Formats: CD, CS, LP	—
Racing Father Time	Released: November 16, 2010; Label: Atlantic, Top Dog; Formats: CD, digital download	154
"—" denotes a recording that did not chart or was not released in that territory.

== Singles ==
=== As lead artist ===
List of singles, with selected chart positions and certifications, showing year released and album name
Title	Year	Peak chart positions										Certifications	Album
Title	Year	US	US Adult	US Main. Rock	AUS	AUT	CAN	GER	NZ	SWI	UK	Certifications	Album
"Yo-Da-Lin in the Valley"	1990	—	—	—	—	—	—	—	—	—	—		Grits Sandwiches for Breakfast
"Back from the Dead"	1992	—	—	—	—	—	—	—	—	—	—		The Polyfuze Method
"U Don't Know Me"	1993	—	—	—	—	—	—	—	—	—	—		The Polyfuze Method
"Prodigal Son"	1993	—	—	—	—	—	—	—	—	—	—		The Polyfuze Method
"Welcome 2 the Party (Ode 2 the Old School)"	1998	—	—	—	—	—	—	—	—	—	—		Devil Without a Cause
"I Am the Bullgod"	1998	—	—	31	—	—	—	—	—	—	—		Devil Without a Cause
"Bawitdaba"	1999	— (Note: "Bawitdaba" did not enter the Billboard Hot 100, but peaked at number 4 on the Bubbling Under Hot 100 Singles chart, which acts as an extension to the Hot 100.)	—	11	—	—	—	84	7	—	41	RMNZ: Gold	Devil Without a Cause
"Cowboy"	1999	82	—	10	52	—	—	—	32	—	36		Devil Without a Cause
"Only God Knows Why"	1999	19	23	5	—	—	13	96	—	—	—		Devil Without a Cause
"Wasting Time"	2000	—	—	35	—	—	—	—	—	—	—		Devil Without a Cause
"American Bad Ass"	2000	—	—	20	—	—	—	26	—	81	25		The History of Rock
"Forever"	2001	—	—	18	27	—	—	52	—	75	—		Cocky
"Lonely Road of Faith"	2001	—	—	15	—	—	—	—	—	—	—		Cocky
"You Never Met a Motherfucker Quite Like Me"	2002	—	—	32	—	—	—	—	—	—	—		Cocky
"Picture" (featuring Sheryl Crow or Allison Moorer)	2002	4	2	—	—	—	2	—	—	—	—	RIAA: Gold; RMNZ: Gold	Cocky
"Feel Like Makin' Love"	2003	—	—	33	—	—	—	—	—	—	—		Kid Rock
"Cold and Empty"	2004	—	20	—	—	—	—	—	—	—	—		Kid Rock
"Jackson, Mississippi"	2004	—	—	14	—	—	—	—	—	—	—		Kid Rock
"I Am"	2004	—	—	28	—	—	—	—	—	—	—		Kid Rock
"Single Father"	2004	—	—	—	—	—	—	—	—	—	—		Kid Rock
"So Hott"	2007	—	—	2	—	—	—	—	—	—	—		Rock n Roll Jesus
"Amen"	2007	—	—	11	—	—	—	—	—	—	—		Rock n Roll Jesus
"All Summer Long"	2008	23	2	17	1	1	12	1	3	1	1	RIAA: Gold; ARIA: Platinum; BPI: Platinum; RMNZ: 4× Platinum	Rock n Roll Jesus
"Roll On"	2008	—	—	—	—	67	—	59	—	—	—		Rock n Roll Jesus
"Rock n Roll Jesus"	2008	—	—	34	—	—	—	—	—	—	—		Rock n Roll Jesus
"Blue Jeans and a Rosary"	2009	—	—	—	—	—	—	—	—	—	—		Rock n Roll Jesus
"Lean on Me" (with Sheryl Crow and Keith Urban)	2010	47	—	—	—	45	11	—	—	—	—		Hope for Haiti Now
"Born Free"	2010	—	39	14	—	21	—	23	—	42	—		Born Free
"God Bless Saturday"	2011	—	—	37	—	—	—	—	—	—	—		Born Free
"Collide" (featuring Sheryl Crow and Bob Seger)	2011	—	—	—	—	—	—	—	—	—	—		Born Free
"Purple Sky"	2011	—	—	—	—	—	—	—	—	—	—		Born Free
"Care" (featuring Martina McBride or Angaleena Presley)	2011	—	26	—	—	—	—	—	—	—	—		Born Free
"In Detroit"	2012	—	—	—	—	—	—	—	—	—	—		—N/a
"Let's Ride"	2012	— (Note: "Let's Ride" did not enter the Billboard Hot 100, but peaked at number 5 on the Bubbling Under Hot 100 Singles chart, which acts as an extension to the Hot 100.)	—	16	—	—	75	—	—	—	—		Rebel Soul
"Rebel Soul"	2013	—	—	—	—	—	—	—	—	—	—		Rebel Soul
"First Kiss"	2015	66	29	16	—	—	71	—	—	—	—		First Kiss
"Po-Dunk"	2017	— (Note: "Po-Dunk" did not enter the Billboard Hot 100, but peaked at number 21 on the Bubbling Under Hot 100 Singles chart, which acts as an extension to the Hot 100.)	—	—	—	—	—	—	—	—	—		Sweet Southern Sugar
"Greatest Show on Earth"	2017	—	—	16	—	—	—	—	—	—	—		Sweet Southern Sugar
"Tennessee Mountain Top"	2017	—	—	—	—	—	—	—	—	—	—		Sweet Southern Sugar
"American Rock 'n Roll"	2018	—	—	—	—	—	—	—	—	—	—		Sweet Southern Sugar
"Quarantine" (as DJ Bobby Shazam)	2020	—	—	—	—	—	—	—	—	—	—		—N/a
"Don't Tell Me How to Live" (featuring Monster Truck)	2021	—	—	—	—	—	— (Note: "Don't Tell Me How to Live" did not enter the Canadian Hot 100, but peaked at number 9 on the Hot Canadian Digital Song Sales chart.)	—	—	—	—		Bad Reputation
"Ala-Fuckin-Bama"	2021	—	—	—	—	—	—	—	—	—	—		Bad Reputation
"We the People"	2022	— (Note: "We the People" did not enter the Billboard Hot 100, but peaked at number 5 on the Bubbling Under Hot 100 Singles chart, which acts as an extension to the Hot 100.)	—	—	—	—	—	—	—	—	—		Bad Reputation
"Rockin'"	2022	—	—	—	—	—	—	—	—	—	—		Bad Reputation
"The Last Dance"	2022	—	—	—	—	—	—	—	—	—	—		Bad Reputation
"No Limits" (with Fueled by 808, Austin Mahone and Jimmie Allen)	2023	—	—	—	—	—	—	—	—	—	—		Non-album singles
"'Til You Can't"	2026	69	—	—	—	—	—	—	—	—	—		Non-album singles
"James 1:17 (Jesus Is King)"	2026	— (Note: "James 1:17 (Jesus Is King)" did not enter the Billboard Hot 100, but peaked at number 26 on the Billboard Hot Christian Songs.)	—	—	—	—	—	—	—	—	—		Non-album singles
"—" denotes a recording that did not chart or was not released in that territory.

Notes

"Cucci Galore", "Happy New Year" and "Redneck Paradise" were also singles off 2012's Rebel Soul; however, none of them charted.

UK promotional singles include "Somebody's Gotta Feel This", "Fist of Rage" and "Where U at Rock" from Devil Without a Cause. "Lay It On Me", "Cocky", "I'm Wrong But You Ain't Right", "Midnight Train to Memphis" and "WCSR" from Cocky were released as promotional singles in Sweden. "Do It for You" from Kid Rock was released as a promotional single in the US and featured in a commercial that ran on CMT. "New Orleans" from Rock n Roll Jesus was also a US promotional single, as was "Johnny Cash" from First Kiss, which also had a music video made for it.

A Promo single was made for the Neptune's Remix of "Cowboy" in 1999.

B-sides include "Pimp of the Nation", "Wax the Booty", "Balls in Your Mouth", "3 Sheets to the Wind", "In So Deep" (Echo Mix), "Wasting Time" (live), "Paid", "My Oedipus Complex", "I'm a Dog", "Guilty", "Rock n Roll Pain Train", "Son of Detroit" (live), "Bawitdaba" (live), "Jesus and Bocephus" and "Wasting Time" (Remix). "Jesus and Bochepus" charted at number 42 on Hot Rock Songs chart, Rock's only B-side to have charted.

=== As featured artist ===
List of singles, with selected chart positions, showing year released and album name
Title	Year	Peak chart positions				Album
Title	Year	US	US Adult	US Country	US R&B	Album
"Rock Star" (R. Kelly featuring Ludacris and Kid Rock)	2007	—	—	—	54	Double Up
"Can't You See" (Zac Brown Band featuring Kid Rock)	2010	— (Note: "Can't You See" did not enter the Billboard Hot 100, but peaked at number 11 on the Bubbling Under Hot 100 Singles chart, which acts as an extension to the Hot 100.)	—	—	—	Pass the Jar
"Good to Be Me" (Uncle Kracker featuring Kid Rock)	2010	— (Note: "Good to Be Me" did not enter the Billboard Hot 100, but peaked at number 13 on the Bubbling Under Hot 100 Singles chart, which acts as an extension to the Hot 100.)	29	28	—	Happy Hour: The South River Road Sessions
"Let's Roll" (Yelawolf featuring Kid Rock)	2011	—	—	—	— (Note: "Let's Roll" did not enter the R&B/Hip-Hop Songs chart, but peaked at number 24 on the Bubbling Under R&B/Hip-Hop Songs chart, which acts as an extension to the R&B/Hip-Hop Songs chart.)	Radioactive
"—" denotes a recording that did not chart or was not released in that territory.

== Other charted songs ==
List of songs, with selected chart positions and certifications, showing year released and album name
Title	Year	Peak chart positions	Album
Title	Year	US Christ.	Album
"Heal My Faith" (featuring Eminem)	2026	38	Halfway to Jesus

== Other appearances ==
=== Album appearances ===
Year	Song	Album
1990	"Make It Nasty" and "Get Off My Bra Strap" (Double MC Twins featuring Kid Rock)	Sex on the Brain EP
1991	"Letting You Know" (The Beast Crew featuring Kid Rock)	Chapter 1: He Don't Want Us No More
1991	"Trick with the Dope Dealer" (High Freq. Mix) (The Beast Crew featuring Kid Rock and Champtown)	Chapter 1: He Don't Want Us No More
1991	"Get Some Drawers" (High Freq. Mix) (The Beast Crew featuring Kid Rock and Champtown)	Chapter 1: He Don't Want Us No More
1992	"Is That You?" (Insane Clown Posse featuring Kid Rock)	Carnival of Carnage
1994	"Ballistics", "Down in the Mix", "Chupale Mi Verga", "Truth Hurts", "Love to Get High" and "Get Your Lips Off My Beer" (Harms Way featuring Kid Rock)	Free Burning, Extra Blanc, Kutcorners EP
1995	"Ballistics", "Down in the Mix", "Chupale Mi Verga", "Truth Hurts", "Sick", "KFB", "Love to Get High" and "Get Your Lips Off My Beer" (Harms Way featuring Kid Rock)	Free Burning, Extra Blanc, Kutcorners LP
1995	"Not Yet Gone" (whirlingRoad featuring Kid Rock)	Twelve Steps Below Walnut
1996	"Armageddon" (Champtown featuring Kid Rock)	Check It! - The EP
1996	"Sunset" (Thornetta Davis featuring Kid Rock)	Sunday Morning Coming Down
1996	"Giant Robot" (Walk On Water featuring Kid Rock)	High-Fi
1996	"All of This" (Kari Newhouse featuring Kid Rock)	Playing Juliet
1997	"Reefer Man" (Howling Diablos featuring Kid Rock)	Green Bottle
1997	"Patterns" (Jason Krause and Scott Krause featuring Kid Rock)	The Paradox Experiment EP
1998	"Ballistics", "Down in the Mix", "Chupale Mi Verga", "Truth Hurts", "Sick", "KFB", "Love Ta Get High", "Get Yer Lips Off My Beer" (Harms Way featuring Kid Rock)	High for Life: Stone Def Hits
1998	"It's My Party" (Live) (Howling Diablos featuring Kid Rock and Joe C.)	It's My Party single
1999	"Just Don't Give A Fuck" (Eminem, featuring scratching by Kid Rock)	The Slim Shady LP
1999	"The School of Old" (Run-D.M.C. featuring Kid Rock)	Crown Royal
1999	"New Skin" (Remix) (Methods of Mayhem featuring Kid Rock)	Methods of Mayhem
1999	"Naked Women and Beer" (Hank Williams, Jr. featuring Kid Rock)	Stormy
1999	"No Women No Cry" (Murder 1 featuring Kid Rock)	American Junkie
2000	"Higher" and "Tramp 2" (Robert Bradley's Blackwater Surprise featuring Kid Rock)	Time to Discover
2000	"Heaven" (Uncle Kracker featuring Kid Rock and Paradime)	Double Wide
2000	"Drinkin' Wine Spo-Dee-O-Dee" (Howling Diablos featuring Kid Rock)	Good Rockin' Tonight - A Legacy to Sun Records
2000	"Cowboy (Neptune's Remix)" (The Neptunes featuring Kid Rock)	"Cowboy (Neptune's Remix)" single
2000	"F.M.A." (Kid Rock featuring Midori)	Deep Porn
2001	"The F-Word" (Hank Williams, Jr. featuring Kid Rock)	Almeria Club Recordings
2001	"Last Stand in Open Country" (Willie Nelson featuring Kid Rock)	The Great Divide
2001	"Shame of Life" (Butthole Surfers featuring Kid Rock)	Weird Revolution
2002	"Bully Jones" (live) (Allison Moorer featuring Kid Rock)	Show
2003	"Gimme Back My Bullets" (Lynyrd Skynyrd featuring Kid Rock)	Vicious Cycle
2004	"Foul Moulf" (Paradime featuring Kid Rock)	11 Steps Down
2004	"Spank" (Kenny Wayne Shepherd featuring Kid Rock)	The Place You're In
2004	"My Name Is Robert Too" (R. L. Burnside featuring Kid Rock)	A Bothered Mind
2005	"The Other Side of Me" (Gretchen Wilson featuring Kid Rock)	All Jacked Up
2005	"Rock This Honky Tonk" (Troy Olsen featuring Kid Rock)	Troy Olsen
2005	"The Way It Should Be" (Hemigod featuring Kid Rock)	All the Kings Horses
2006	"Real Mean Bottle" (Bob Seger featuring Kid Rock)	Face the Promise
2006	"Honky Tonk Women" (Jerry Lee Lewis featuring Kid Rock)	Last Man Standing
2006	"Wild Horses" (Bernard Fowler featuring Kid Rock)	Friends with Privileges
2007	"Rock Star" (R. Kelly featuring Ludacris and Kid Rock)	Double Up
2008	"2 Getha 4 Eva" (Trick-Trick ft Kid Rock, Proof and Esham)	The Villain
2008	"From the D" (Trick-Trick ft Kid Rock, Proof and Eminem)	Trick Trick Mix Tape
2008	"Warrior"	National Guard Tribute
2010	"Lean on Me" (Sheryl Crow, Kid Rock and Keith Urban)	Hope for Haiti Now
2010	"I Hold On" (Slash featuring Kid Rock)	Slash
2010	"I Know How"	Coal Miner's Daughter: A Tribute to Loretta Lynn
2010	"Can't You See" (Zac Brown Band featuring Kid Rock)	Pass the Jar
2010	"Rocking My Life Away" (Jerry Lee Lewis and Slash featuring Kid Rock)	Mean Old Man
2010	"Good to Be Me" (Uncle Kracker featuring Kid Rock)	Happy Hour: The South River Road Sessions
2010	"Downtime" (Timothy B. Schmit, Dwight Yoakam and Gary Burton featuring Kid Rock)	Expando
2011	"Well All Right"	Rave On Buddy Holly
2011	"Let's Roll" (Yelawolf featuring Kid Rock)	Radioactive
2011	"Ms Orleans" (Trombone Shorty featuring Kid Rock)	For True
2012	"In Detroit"	Pepsi Anthems
2012	"Born on the Bayou" (John Fogerty featuring Kid Rock)	Wrote a Song for Everyone
2012	"Take Hold of My Hand" (Dwight Yoakam featuring Kid Rock)	3 Pears
2013	"Messin' with the Kid" (Buddy Guy featuring Kid Rock)	Rhythm & Blues
2013	"Knockdown Dragout" (Sammy Hagar featuring Kid Rock)	Sammy Hagar & Friends
2013	"We're Going Out" (Nic Cowan featuring Kid Rock)	"Hard Headed"
2014	"Lincoln Continentals and Cadillacs" (Tim McGraw featuring Kid Rock)	Sundown Heaven Town
2015	"Bad Motherfucker" (Machine Gun Kelly featuring Kid Rock)	General Admission
2016	"Highway of Heroes" (alternate version) (The Trews featuring Kid Rock)	Time Capsule
2016	"Jezebel Jones" (Frankie Miller featuring Full House and Kid Rock)	Double Take
2017	"Bad Feeling" (Gretchen Wilson featuring Kid Rock)	Ready to Get Rowdy
2017	"Get Mine" (Yelawolf featuring Kid Rock)	Trial by Fire
2020	"Cowboys on the Run" (Tim Montana featuring Kid Rock)	American Thread
2021	"Higher Education" (Michael Ray featuring Kid Rock, Lee Brice, Billy Gibbons and Tim Montana)	Higher Education
2023	"Either Or"(Dolly Parton featuring Kid Rock)	Rockstar

=== Soundtrack appearances ===
Year	Song	Album
1999	"Fuck Off" (featuring Eminem)	Strangeland
1999	"Warm Winter"	The Crow: Salvation
1999	"Kyle's Mom Is a Big Fat Bitch" (featuring Joe C.)	South Park: Bigger, Longer & Uncut
1999	"Fuck That"	Any Given Sunday
2000	"Bawitdaba" (Lower Than You Remix)	Ready to Rumble
2000	"Early Morning Stoned Pimp"	Road Trip
2000	"Blast"	Mayhem (2000)
2000	"Bitches" (Kid Rock Cock Rock Mix)	Mindless Self Indulgence
2000	"I Am the Bullgod" (Lucursi Live Mix)	MTV The Return of the Rock
2001	"Cool Daddy Cool" (featuring Joe C.)	Osmosis Jones
2002	"Saturday Night's Alright for Fighting" (featuring Chad Kroeger and Dimebag Darrell) (Elton John cover)	Charlie's Angels: Full Throttle soundtrack
2002	"Legs" (ZZ Top cover)	WWE Forceable Entry
2003	"Luckenbach, Texas (Back to the Basics of Love)" (featuring Kenny Chesney) (Waylon Jennings cover)	I've Always Been Crazy: A Tribute to Waylon Jennings
2004	"Long Haired Country Boy" (acoustic)	Motorcycle Mania 3 Soundtrack

== Music videos ==
=== As lead artist ===
List of music videos, showing year released and director
Title	Year	Director(s)
"Back from the Dead"	1993	Kid Rock
"U Don't Know Me"	1994	—N/a
"Welcome 2 the Party (Ode 2 the Old School)" (version 1)	1998	Gilly Barnes
"I Am the Bullgod"	1999	Ken Fox
"Bawitdaba"	1999	David Meyers
"Welcome 2 the Party (Ode 2 the Old School)" (version 2)	1999	—N/a
"Cowboy"	1999	David Meyers
"King of Rock" / "Bawitdaba" / "Walk This Way" (live) (with Aerosmith and Run–D.M.C.)	1999	Beth McCarthy Miller
"Only God Knows Why"	1999	Clark Eddy, Jamie Stafford
"American Bad Ass"	2000	David Meyers
"Forever"	2001	Wayne Isham
"You Never Met a Motherfucker Quite Like Me"	2002	Robert Hales
"Lonely Road of Faith"	2002	Alex Coletti, Steve Paley
"Picture" (featuring Sheryl Crow)	2002	JB Carlin
"Feel Like Makin' Love"	2003	Chris Applebaum
"Cold and Empty"	2004	The Malloys
"Jackson, Mississippi"	2004	Agwwf Par
"Honky Tonk Woman" (with Jerry Lee Lewis)	2006	Trey Fanjoy
"So Hott"	2007	Jay Martin
"Amen"	2008	Jonas Åkerlund
"All Summer Long"	2008	Deaton-Flanigen
"Roll On"	2008	Deaton-Flanigen
"Born Free"	2010	Marc Klasfeld
"Collide" (featuring Sheryl Crow)	2011	Deaton-Flanigen
"Care" (featuring Angaleena Presley and T.I.)	2011	Mark Pellington
"Redneck Paradise"	2012	Darren Doane
"Let's Ride"	2012	Travis Kopach
"Cucci Galore"	2012	Jameson Stafford
"Happy New Year"	2012	Jameson Stafford
"Redneck Paradise" (Remix) (with Hank Williams, Jr.)	2013	Eric Welch
"First Kiss"	2015	Eric Welch
"Johnny Cash"	2015	Eric Welch
"Po-Dunk"	2017	Marc Klasfeld
"Greatest Show On Earth"	2017	Marc Klasfeld
"Tennessee Mountain Top"	2017	Mark Staubach
"American Rock 'n Roll"	2018	Jeffrey C. Phillips
"Don't Tell Me How to Live" (featuring Monster Truck)	2021	Blake Judd
"We the People"	2022	Blake Judd
"Shakedown" (featuring Robert James)	2022	Blake Judd
"Never Quit"	2022	Blake Judd

=== As featured artist ===
List of music videos, showing year released and director
Title	Year	Director(s)
"Naked Women and Beer" (Hank Williams, Jr. featuring Kid Rock)	1999	Bill Fishman
"Rock Star" (R. Kelly featuring Ludacris and Kid Rock)	2007	Robert Kelly, Elliot Rosenblaut
"Good to Be Me" (Uncle Kracker featuring Kid Rock)	2010	Christopher Sims
