= Devil Without a Cause Tour =

1998–99 concert tour by Kid Rock

- Tour by Kid Rock
- Location: North America; Europe
- Associated album: Devil Without a Cause
- Start date: July 18, 1998
- End date: December 11, 1999
- Legs: 4
- No. of shows: 202

Kid Rock concert chronology
- Pimp of the Nation Tour (1996–97); Devil Without a Cause Tour (1998–99); History of Rock Tour (2000)

The Devil Without a Cause Tour was a concert tour from 1998-99 by American rapper and singer Kid Rock. After more than 10 years of being in the music industry his album Devil Without a Cause gave him his breakthrough, He also performed at Woodstock '99 as part of the tour.

The tour was broken up in 4 different tours including the Devil Without a Cause Tour, the White Trash on Dope Tour, the Destroy Your Liver Tour, and the Between the Legs Tour.

The Main Tour was also a mix with Limp Bizkit's Limptropolis Tour

== Setlist ==
White Trash on Dope Tour
1. "Devil Without a Cause"
2. "Bawitdaba"
3. "3 Sheets to the Wind (What's My Name)"
4. "Welcome 2 the Party (Ode 2 the Old School)"
5. "I Am the Bullgod"
6. "Balls in Your Mouth"
7. "Fuck You Blind"
8. "A Country Boy Can Survive"
9. "My Name is Rock"
10. "Wasting Time"
11. "Prodigal Son"
12. "Somebody's Gotta Feel This"
13. "Fist of Rage"
14. "Yo-Da-Lin in the Valley"
15. "Can't You See"
16. "Cowboy"

Encore

22. "Where U At Rock"
23. "Fuck Off"
Destroy Your Liver Tour
1. "Devil Without a Cause"
2. "3 Sheets to the Wind (What's My Name)"
3. "Welcome 2 the Party (Ode 2 the Old School)"
4. "I Am the Bullgod"
5. "Balls in Your Mouth"
6. "My Name is Rock"
7. "Somebody's Gotta Feel This"
8. "Fist of Rage"
9. "I Got One for Ya'"
10. "Wax The Booty"
11. "Wasting Time"
12. "Cowboy"
13. "Sister Anne/We're an American Band/Ramblin' Gamblin' Man/Stranglehold/My Name Is"
14. "Bawitdaba"

Encore

15. "Where U At Rock"
16. "Black Chick, White Guy"
17. "Only God Knows Why"
18. "Fuck Off"
Devil Without a Cause Tour (opening for Limp Bizkit's Limptropolis tour)
1. "Bawitdaba"
2. "Devil Without a Cause"
3. "Welcome 2 the Party (Ode 2 the Old School)"
4. "I Am the Bullgod"
5. "Balls in Your Mouth"
6. "Somebody's Gotta Feel This"
7. "Fist of Rage"
8. "Fortunate Son" (select dates only)
9. "Cowboy"
10. "My Name is Rock"
Between the Legs Tour
1. "Bawitdaba"
2. "Welcome 2 the Party (Ode 2 the Old School)"
3. "Fuck Off"
4. "Devil Without a Cause"
5. "I Am the Bullgod"
6. "I Got One for Ya'"
7. "A Country Boy Can Survive"
8. "Fortunate Son"
9. "We're an American Band"
10. "Somebody's Gotta Feel This"
11. "Fist of Rage"
12. "Cowboy"
13. "Wasting Time"
14. "My Name is Rock"
15. "Only God Knows Why"

== Personnel ==
- Kid Rock – lead vocals
- Joe C. – co-vocals
- Jason Krause – guitar
- Kenny Olson – guitar
- Uncle Kracker – turntables, background vocals
- Jimmie Bones – keyboard, organ, piano, synth bass
- Michael Bradford – bass (joined during the Between the Legs Tour)
- Stefanie Eulinberg – drums, percussion

== Tour dates ==
Date	City	Country	Venue	Associated Acts
White Trash on Dope Tour
July 18, 1998	Somerset	United States	Float Rite Park (Note: This concert was part of Ozzfest 1998)	
July 22, 1998	Pontiac	United States	Phoenix Center Street	
September 10, 1998	Cleveland	United States	Peabody's	
September 11, 1998	Columbus	United States	Chelsie's	
September 12, 1998	Cincinnati	United States	Bogarts	Pushmonkey, Cold
September 19, 1998	Old Bridge	United States	Birch Hill Nite Club	
September 20, 1998	Worcester	United States	Green Hill Park (Note: This concert was part of Locobazooka)	
September 21, 1998	State College	United States	Crowbar	
September 25, 1998	Detroit	United States	State Theater	Buddha Fulla Rymez
September 26, 1998	Grand Rapids	United States	The Intersection	
September 27, 1998	Toledo	United States	Toledo Sports Arena (Note: This concert was part of The Buzz 106.5 Buzzfest)	
October 1, 1998	Pittsburgh	United States	Graffiti	
October 2, 1998	Huntington	United States	The Stoned Monkey	
October 3, 1998	Huntington	United States	Vinnie's	
October 4, 1998	Roanoke	United States	Dr Pepper Park at the Bridges	
October 6, 1998	Cincinnati	United States	Ripley's	Fishbone
October 7, 1998	Chicago	United States	House of Blues	Fishbone
October 8, 1998	Columbus	United States	Mekka	
October 9, 1998	Urbana	United States	The Canopy Club	
October 11, 1998	East Lansing	United States	Rick's American Cafe	
October 12, 1998	Fort Wayne	United States	Piere's Entertainment Center	
October 14, 1998	Louisville	United States	Toy Tiger	
October 15, 1998	Chattanooga	United States	The Bay	
October 16, 1998	Ridgeland	United States	Muddy Waters	North Mississippi Allstars
October 17, 1998	Shreveport	United States	Malibu Alley	
October 19, 1998	Memphis	United States	Barristers	
October 20, 1998	Knoxville	United States	Moose's Music Hall	Zebrahead
October 22, 1998	St. Louis	United States	Side Door	
October 23, 1998	Springfield	United States	Juke Joint	
October 25, 1998	Denver	United States	Bluebird Theater	
October 29, 1998	Reno	United States	Del Mar Station	Zebrahead, Bolt Upright
October 30, 1998	Sacramento	United States	Crest Theatre	Gravity Kills, Simon Says
November 3, 1998	Los Angeles	United States	Troubadour	Zebrahead, Bedrin Daddies
November 5, 1998	Mesa	United States	The Heat	Zebrahead, Bolt Upright
November 8, 1998	Dallas	United States	Galaxy Club	
November 10, 1998	Austin	United States	Emo's	Zebrahead
November 11, 1998	Houston	United States	Instant Karma	
November 12, 1998	New Orleans	United States	Jimmy's	Zebrahead
November 13, 1998	Pensacola	United States	Sluggo's	
November 16, 1998	Orlando	United States	Sapphire Supper Club	
November 17, 1998	Jacksonville	United States	Fat Cat Music Hall	
November 18, 1998	Tallahassee	United States	Floyd's Music Store	
November 20, 1998	Spartanburg	United States	Magnolia Street Pub	
November 21, 1998	Atlanta	United States	Cotton Club	Zebrahead
November 22, 1998	Charleston	United States	Music Farm	
November 24, 1998	Washington, D.C.	United States	The Bayou	Live Alien Broadcast, Puya
November 25, 1998	Syracuse	United States	The Lost Horizon	
November 27, 1998	Boston	United States	Axis	
November 28, 1998	Philadelphia	United States	Trocadero Theatre	The Boils
December 4, 1998	Cincinnati	United States	Top Cats	
December 11, 1998	Huntington	United States	Gyrationz	
December 12, 1998	Toledo	United States	Main Event	
December 15, 1998	New York City	United States	Irving Plaza	Pushmonkey, Placebo
December 16, 1998	Hartford	United States	Webster Theater (Note: This concert was part of WCCC Nutcracker)	
December 18, 1998	Old Bridge	United States	Birch Hill Nite Club	Sevendust, Reveille, One Minute Silence
December 20, 1998	Detroit	United States	Joe Louis Arena (Note: This concert was part of The Night 89X Stole Christmas)	
December 31, 1998	New York	United States	MTV Studios (Note: This concert was part of MTV New Year's Eve)	
January 2, 1999	Lancaster	United States	The Chameleon Club	Jimmie's Chicken Shack, Godsmack, Pushmonkey
January 16, 1999	Spartanburg	United States	Ground Zero	Hed PE, Queens of the Stone Age, Monster Magnet
January 17, 1999	Atlanta	United States	The Masquerade	Hed PE, Monster Magnet
January 19, 1999	New Orleans	United States	House of Blues	Hed PE, Monster Magnet
January 20, 1999	Houston	United States	Numbers	Hed PE, Monster Magnet
January 22, 1999	Lubbock	United States	The Depot Warehouse	Hed PE, Monster Magnet
January 23, 1999	Las Vegas	United States	The Joint	Hed PE, Monster Magnet
January 24, 1999	Tucson	United States	Gotham New West	Hed PE, Monster Magnet
January 26, 1999	West Hollywood	United States	Troubadour	Hed PE, Static-X, Monster Magnet
January 29, 1999	Salt Lake City	United States	The Holy Cow	Hed PE, Monster Magnet
January 30, 1999	Colorado Springs	United States	All Stars Rock Café	Hed PE, Monster Magnet
January 31, 1999	Boulder	United States	Fox Theatre	Hed PE, Monster Magnet
February 2, 1999	Minneapolis	United States	First Avenue	Hed PE, Monster Magnet
February 3, 1999	Milwaukee	United States	The Rave	Hed PE, Monster Magnet
February 4, 1999	Chicago	United States	House of Blues	Hed PE, Staind, Monster Magnet
February 5, 1999	St Louis	United States	Mississippi Nights	Hed PE, Monster Magnet
February 6, 1999	Lexington	United States	A1A Concert Hall	Hed PE, Monster Magnet
February 7, 1999	Cincinnati	United States	Bogart's	Hed PE, Monster Magnet
February 9, 1999	Pittsburgh	United States	Graffiti	Hed PE, Monster Magnet
February 10, 1999	Toronto	Canada	The Guvernment	Hed PE, Monster Magnet
February 12, 1999	Sea Bright	United States	Tradewinds	Hed PE, Monster Magnet
February 13, 1999	Philadelphia	United States	Trocadero Theatre	Hed PE, Monster Magnet
Destroy Your Liver Tour				
March 16, 1999	Cancún	Mexico	Grand Oasis Cancún (Note: This concert was part of MTV Spring Break)	
March 19, 1999	Detroit	United States	State Theatre	Staind
March 20, 1999	Columbus	United States	Newport Music Hall	Staind
March 21, 1999	Rochester	United States	Water Street Music Hall	Staind
March 22, 1999	Providence	United States	Lupo's Heartbreak Hotel	Staind
March 24, 1999	New York	United States	Bowery Ballroom	Staind
March 25, 1999	Washington D.C.	United States	Nation	Staind
March 26, 1999	Winston Salem	United States	Ziggy's	Staind
March 27, 1999	Atlanta	United States	Cotton Club	Staind
March 29, 1999	Miami Beach	United States	Cameo Theatre	Staind
March 30, 1999	South Daytona	United States	Neon Moon	Staind
March 31, 1999	Orlando	United States	House of Blues	Staind
April 1, 1999	Tampa	United States	The Rubb	Staind
April 2, 1999	Dallas	United States	Deep Ellum Live	Staind
April 5, 1999	Phoenix	United States	The Mason Jar	Staind
April 7, 1999	West Hollywood	United States	The Roxy	Staind
April 8, 1999	Palo Alto	United States	The Edge	Staind
April 9, 1999	Sacramento	United States	Colonial Theater	Staind, Papa Roach
April 14, 1999	Minneapolis	United States	The Quest	Staind
April 15, 1999	Des Moines	United States	Uncle Frog's	Staind
April 16, 1999	Lawrence	United States	Granada Theater	Staind
April 17, 1999	St. Louis	United States	Mississippi Nights	Staind
April 18, 1999	Memphis	United States	New Daisy Theatre	Staind
April 19, 1999	Knoxville	United States	Moose's Music Hall	Staind
April 21, 1999	Chicago	United States	House of Blues	Staind
April 22, 1999	Bloomington	United States	Pic-a-Pac Theater	Staind, Cypress Hill
April 23, 1999	Grand Rapids	United States	The Intersection	Staind
April 24, 1999	Toledo	United States	Main Event	Staind
April 25, 1999	Cincinnati	United States	Bogart's	Staind
April 27, 1999	Philadelphia	United States	Trocadero Theatre	Staind
April 28, 1999	Pittsburgh	United States	Graffiti	Staind, Hatebreed, Candiria
April 29, 1999	Louisville	United States	Headliners	Staind, Flaw
April 30, 1999	Nashville	United States	Riverfront Park (Note: This concert was part of Nashville River Stages)	
May 1, 1999	Atlanta	United States	Centennial Olympic Park (Note: This concert was part of Music Midtown)	
May 2, 1999	Zephyrhills	United States	Festival Park (Note: This concert was part of Livestock Festival)	
May 14, 1999	Stockholm	Sweden	Studion	
May 15, 1999	Malmö	Sweden	Kulturbolaget	
May 16, 1999	Copenhagen	Denmark	Lille Vega	
May 19, 1999	Hamburg	Germany	Schlachthof	
May 22, 1999	Nürburg	Germany	Nürburgring (Note: This concert was part of Rock Am Ring)	
May 23, 1999	Nuremberg	Germany	Frankenstadion (Note: This concert was part of Rock Am Park)	
May 30, 1999	Amsterdam	Netherlands	Melkweg The Max	
Devil Without a Cause main Tour				
June 11, 1999	Wantagh	United States	Jones Beach Theater (Note: This concert was part of WXRK 92.3 Dysfunctional Family Picnic)	
June 12, 1999	Council Bluffs	United States	Westfair Amphitheater (Note: This concert was part of KIWR 89.7 Rockfest)	
June 18, 1999	Mountain View	United States	Shoreline Amphitheater (Note: This concert was part of Live 105 BFD)	
June 19, 1999	Irvine	United States	Irvine Meadows Amphitheatre (Note: This concert was part of KROQ Weenie Roast)	
June 20, 1999	Sacramento	United States	Hornet Field (Note: This concert was part of Jamboree)	
June 22, 1999	Seattle	United States	Mercer Arena	Limp Bizkit, Staind
June 23, 1999	Salem	United States	Armory Auditorium	Limp Bizkit, Staind
June 25, 1999	San Diego	United States	Cox Arena	Limp Bizkit, Staind
June 26, 1999	Mesa	United States	Mesa Amphitheater	Limp Bizkit, Staind
June 28, 1999	Denver	United States	Fillmore Auditorium	Limp Bizkit, Staind
June 29, 1999	Albuquerque	United States	Tingley Coliseum (Note: This concert was part of KTEG Edgefest)	
July 1, 1999	Austin	United States	City Coliseum	Limp Bizkit, Staind
July 2, 1999	San Antonio	United States	Sunken Gardens Theater	Limp Bizkit, Staind
July 3, 1999	Dallas	United States	Bronco Bowl	Limp Bizkit, Staind
July 5, 1999	Biloxi	United States	Mississippi Coast Coliseum	Limp Bizkit, Staind
July 6, 1999	Jacksonville	United States	Jacksonville Memorial Coliseum	Limp Bizkit, Staind
July 7, 1999	Orlando	United States	Hard Rock Live	
July 9, 1999	Atlanta	United States	International Ballroom	Limp Bizkit, Staind
July 10, 1999	Louisville	United States	Louisville Gardens	Limp Bizkit, Staind, Simon Says
July 12, 1999	St. Paul	United States	Roy Wilkins Auditorium	Limp Bizkit, Staind, Cold
July 13, 1999	Chicago	United States	Aragon Ballroom	Limp Bizkit, Staind
July 14, 1999	Milwaukee	United States	Eagles Ballroom	Limp Bizkit, Staind
July 16, 1999	Pontiac	United States	Phoenix Plaza Amphitheater	Limp Bizkit, Staind
July 18, 1999	Philadelphia	United States	Electric Factory	Limp Bizkit, Staind
July 19, 1999	Pittsburgh	United States	Civic Arena	Limp Bizkit, Staind
July 20, 1999	Fairfax	United States	Patriot Center	Limp Bizkit, Staind
July 22, 1999	New York	United States	Hammerstein Ballroom	Limp Bizkit, Staind, Run-DMC
July 23, 1999	Lowell	United States	Tsongas Arena	Limp Bizkit, Staind
July 24, 1999	Rome	United States	Griffiss Air Force Base (Note: This concert was part of Woodstock '99)	
July 26, 1999	Cleveland	United States	Nautica Stage	Powerman 5000
July 27, 1999	Grand Rapids	United States	The Orbit Room	Howling Diablos
August 7, 1999	Bremerton	United States	Kitsap County Fairgrounds (Note: This concert was part of KNDD 107.7 Endfest)	
August 13, 1999	Columbus	United States	Polaris Amphitheater (Note: This concert was part of 99.7 The Blitz Anniversary Bash)	
August 14, 1999	Noblesville	United States	Deer Creek Music Center (Note: This concert was part of WRZX X-Fest)	
August 21, 1999	Maryland Heights	United States	Riverport Amphitheatre (Note: This concert was part of Extreme Radio Hoedown)	
August 28, 1999	Tulsa	United States	Mohawk Park (Note: This concert was part of KMYZ Edgeest)	
September 9, 1999	New York	United States	The Metropolitan Opera (Note: This concert was part of MTV Video Music Awards)	
September 10, 1999	Providence	United States	Providence Civic Center (Note: This concert was part of WBRU Birthday Bash 1999)	
September 11, 1999	Virginia Beach	United States	GTE Virginia Beach Amphitheater (Note: This concert was part of Lunatic Luau)	
September 17, 1999	Greenwood Village	United States	Fiddler's Green Amphitheatre	P.O.D.
September 18, 1999	Peoria	United States	Peoria Sports Complex (Note: This concert was part of That Damn Show)	
Between the Legs Tour				
September 22, 1999	Glasgow	United Kingdom	The Garage	
September 24, 1999	Manchester	United Kingdom	Manchester Academy 2	
September 25, 1999	London	United Kingdom	Astoria 2	
September 26, 1999	Frankfurt	Germany	Batschkapp	
September 27, 1999	Amsterdam	Germany	Melkweg Oude Zaal	blink‐182
September 28, 1999	Hamburg	Germany	Markthalle	
September 30, 1999	Berlin	Germany	Columbia Fritz	
October 2, 1999	Vienna	Austria	Planet Music	
October 3, 1999	Munich	Germany	Incognito	
October 4, 1999	Cologne	Germany	Live Music Hall	Tocotronic
October 5, 1999	Stuttgart	Germany	Die Röhre	
October 6, 1999	Bielefeld	Germany	JZ Kamp	
October 7, 1999	Essen	Germany	Zeche Carl	
October 9, 1999	Paris	France	Le Divan du Monde Paris	
October 20, 1999	Kalamazoo	United States	Wings Stadium	Powerman 5000, DDT
October 22, 1999	Chicago	United States	Aragon Ballroom	Powerman 5000, DDT
October 23, 1999	Auburn Hills	United States	The Palace of Auburn Hills	Powerman 5000, DDT
October 25, 1999	Toronto	Canada	The Warehouse	Powerman 5000, DDT
October 27, 1999	Lowell	United States	Tsongas Arena	Powerman 5000, DDT
October 29, 1999	Philadelphia	United States	Electric Factory	Powerman 5000, DDT
October 30, 1999	Fairfax	United States	Patriot Center	Powerman 5000, DDT
November 1, 1999	New York	United States	Hammerstein Ballroom	Powerman 5000, DDT
November 2, 1999	New York	United States	Hammerstein Ballroom	Powerman 5000, DDT
November 4, 1999	North Myrtle Beach	United States	House of Blues	Powerman 5000, Bolt Upright
November 5, 1999	Atlanta	United States	Tabernacle	Powerman 5000, Bolt Upright
November 6, 1999	Tampa	United States	USF Sun Dome	Powerman 5000, Bolt Upright
November 7, 1999	West Palm Beach	United States	Coral Sky Amphitheatre (Note: This concert was part of Buzz Bake Sale)	Powerman 5000, Bolt Upright
November 11, 1999	Orlando	United States	UCF Arena	Powerman 5000, Bolt Upright
November 12, 1999	Tallahassee	United States	Tallahassee-Leon County Civic Center	Powerman 5000, Professional Murder Music
November 14, 1999	New Orleans	United States	Kiefer UNO Lakefront Arena	Powerman 5000, Bolt Upright
November 15, 1999	Houston	United States	Aerial Theater at Bayou Place	Powerman 5000, Bolt Upright
November 16, 1999	Austin	United States	Austin Music Hall	Powerman 5000, Bolt Upright
November 18, 1999	Denver	United States	Fillmore Auditorium	Powerman 5000, Bolt Upright
November 19, 1999	Magna	United States	Saltair	Powerman 5000, Bolt Upright
November 21, 1999	Salem	United States	Salem Armory Auditorium	Powerman 5000, Bolt Upright
November 22, 1999	Seattle	United States	Mercer Arena	Powerman 5000, Bolt Upright, Professional Murder Music
November 24, 1999	Sacramento	United States	Sacramento Memorial Auditorium	Powerman 5000
November 26, 1999	San Jose	United States	Event Center Arena	Powerman 5000
November 27, 1999	Los Angeles	United States	Hollywood Palladium	Powerman 5000, Professional Murder Music
November 28, 1999	Los Angeles	United States	Hollywood Palladium	Powerman 5000, Professional Murder Music
December 1, 1999	Las Vegas	United States	The Joint	Powerman 5000
December 2, 1999	Mesa	United States	Mesa Amphitheatre	Powerman 5000
December 4, 1999	Lubbock	United States	Fair Park Coliseum	Powerman 5000
December 5, 1999	Dallas	United States	Bronco Bowl	Powerman 5000, Professional Murder Music
December 7, 1999	Kansas City	United States	Memorial Hall	Powerman 5000
December 9, 1999	Indianapolis	United States	Conseco Fieldhouse	Powerman 5000, Professional Murder Music
December 10, 1999	Louisville	United States	Louisville Gardens	Powerman 5000, Professional Murder Music
December 11, 1999	Atlanta	United States	Atlanta Civic Center	Oleander
