= John Travis (producer) =

British record producer

John Travis is a London-born record producer, producer, audio engineer, mixer, songwriter and actor whose work was primarily based in New York and Los Angeles, California since 2004.

Before being called in for producing, he was primarily an engineer for artists such as Run-DMC, Onyx, Brand Nubian, and Wu-Tang Clan

His history included work with such artists as Kid Rock, Social Distortion, Static-X, Buckcherry, Suicide Silence, the Answer, Twin Atlantic, No Doubt and Sugar Ray.

== Production credits ==
Year	Artist	Album	Role	Song(s)	Record label(s)
1997	Sugar Ray	Floored	Engineer		
1998	Kid Rock	Devil Without A Cause	Producer	"Bawitdaba" "Cowboy" "Devil Without A Cause" "I Got One For Ya'" "Somebody's Gotta Feel This" "Fist of Rage" "Only God Knows Why"	Lava Atlantic Top Dog
1999	Save Ferris	Modified	Producer	Entire album	Epic Daylight Starpool
1999	Dope	Felons and Revolutionaries	Producer	Entire album	Epic Flip
2000	Boiler Room	Can't Breathe	Producer	Entire album	Tommy Boy Roadrunner
2000	Dexter Freebish	A Life of Saturdays	Producer	Entire album except for "Bring Me Water"	Capitol
2001	Buckcherry	Time Bomb	Producer	Entire album	DreamWorks
