= My Oedipus Complex =

My Oedipus Complex may refer to:

- "My Oedipus Complex", a short story written by Frank O'Connor
- "My Oedipus Complex", one of a number of singles in the Kid Rock discography

== See also ==
- Oedipus complex, classical psychoanalytic theory
