= Early Mornin' Stoned Pimp =

Studio album by Kid Rock
- Released: January 9, 1996
- Recorded: July 1994 – December 1995
- Studio: White Rooms (Detroit)
- Genres: Rap metal; hip-hop; funk; soul
- Length: 65:59
- Label: Top Dog
- Producer: Kid Rock

Kid Rock chronology
Fire It Up (1993)	Early Mornin' Stoned Pimp (1996)	Devil Without a Cause (1998)

Early Mornin' Stoned Pimp is the third studio album by the American musician Kid Rock and the first to feature his backing band Twisted Brown Trucker. Released on January 9, 1996 by Top Dog Records, the album is a further shift in Kid Rock's sound toward rock music, also furthering his rap metal sound and shaping the redneck image he would become known for.

== Background ==
The recording sessions saw Kid Rock work with R&B singer Thornetta Davis, who says that she asked him not to credit her on the album due to its risqué lyrics on the song "Paid;" however, this request was ignored. The album's title came from engineer Bob Ebeling, who told a sleepless, alcoholic, drug-using Kid Rock, "Dude, you are the early-morning, stoned pimp." The recording sessions marked the first time Kid Rock would work with Jimmie "Bones" Trombly, who soon joined his backup band, Twisted Brown Trucker.

"Jackson, Mississippi" was originally recorded for the album, but remained unreleased until Kid Rock's self-titled 2003 album.

== Artistry ==
Early Mornin' Stoned Pimp features what MTV describes as "[an] eclectic collection of funk, rap, soul and rock." It was his most rock-oriented album at the time, and is seen as furthering the rap metal style of The Polyfuze Method, and also for shaping Kid Rock's redneck image and being the first album of his to explore his Southern rock influences, after "two albums of pure Beastie Boys worship".

The title track "captured the laid back pimp desperado persona that Rock had finally perfected", according to The Village Voice writer Chaz Kangas. The song's lyrics also diss Billy Ray Cyrus. "Where U At Rock?" references philosopher Ayn Rand.

In Chuck Eddy's Rock and Roll Always Forgets: A Quarter Century of Music Criticism, the music on Early Morning Stoned Pimp is categorized by musical elements such as "descending symphonic blaxploitation wah-wah", "hardboiled barbeque rib joint boogie drama, soul sister backup", "synth sirens", "Frampton vocoders", "shotgun blasts, [and] spy movie organ". Eddy believes the album exhibits influence from Blowfly, Rudy Ray Moore, Swamp Dogg, Parliament and the dozens.

The lyrics of "Black Chick, White Guy" deal with Kid Rock's ten-year off-and-on relationship with a classmate named Kelley South Russell. Rock fathered a son with Russell; he also raised her son from a previous relationship. He broke up with her after finding out that a third child he was raising was not his. After this, he gained custody of his son, Robert James Ritchie Jr. These events became the inspiration for this song, which discusses them directly. However, Russell denies some of the allegations made against her in the lyrics.

== Release ==
According to Kid Rock, who distributed the album himself, Early Morning Stoned Pimp sold 14,000 copies. The album was not offered for sale when his catalog became available on iTunes.

=== Critical reception ===
Professional ratings
Review scores
Source	Rating
AllMusic	2.5/5 stars

AllMusic, which did not review the album, gave it two and a half out of five stars. The Village Voice writer Chaz Kangas called the title track a "classic", writing, "The reason the track works so well is because Rock’s own love and incorporation of his musical references isn’t rooted in a nostalgia or a 'tribute,' but rather in his actively engaging the elements he finds compelling into a wholly new hodgepodge of his own invention."

== Track listing ==
1. "Intro" – 0:50
2. "Early Mornin' Stoned Pimp" (featuring Tino) – 7:18
3. "Paid" – 5:15
4. "I Wanna Go Back" – 5:14
5. "Live" (featuring Esham) – 2:34
6. "Detroit Thang" (featuring The Howling Diablos) – 6:22
7. "Ya Keep On" – 3:55
8. "Shotgun Blast" – 2:18
9. "Freestyle Rhyme" – 3:57
10. "Classic Rock" – 2:42
11. "My Name Is Rock" – 4:30
12. "Where U at Rock" – 5:08
13. "Krack Rocks" (featuring Uncle Kracker) – 4:09
14. "The Prodigal Son Returns" – 3:16
15. "Black Chick, White Guy" – 7:10
16. "Outro" – 0:38

== Personnel ==
- Kid Rock – vocals
- Uncle Kracker – turntables
- Andrew Nerha – guitar, drums
- Chris Peters – guitar
- Bobby East – guitar, bass
- Bob Ebeling – drums
- Marlon Young – bass guitar
- Jimmie Bones – piano
- Eddie Harsch – organ
- Thornetta Davis – background vocals
