= Fire It Up (EP) =

- Artwork of the original cassette release

EP by Kid Rock
- Released: December 1, 1993
- Recorded: June 1993
- Studios: The White Room, Detroit, Michigan
- Genre: Rap rock
- Labels: Continuum; Top Dog
- Producers: Kid Rock; Andrew Nehra; Michael Nehra; Mike E. Clark; D-Square

Kid Rock chronology
The Polyfuze Method (1993)	Fire It Up (1993)	Early Mornin' Stoned Pimp (1996)

Professional ratings
Review scores
Source	Rating
Rolling Stone	2/5 stars
The Rolling Stone Album Guide	2/5 stars

Fire It Up is the second EP by American musician Kid Rock. Released on December 1, 1993, the vinyl edition served as a single for "I Am the Bullgod", consisting of that song and "My Oedipus Complex" as a B-side! the cassette and compact disc editions were extended plays with other songs.

== Release ==
Fire It Up was released on cassette, compact disc, and 7" vinyl by indie label Continuum Records. Following the success of Devil Without a Cause, Kid Rock purchased the rights to the EP and licensed it to Atlantic Records. At the time of its release, Fire It Up never received much attention outside the local Detroit area; however, it was nominated by the National Association of Independent Record Distributors for Best Heavy Metal Album in its Indie Awards in 1994. The EP was not offered for sale when Kid Rock's catalog became available on iTunes.

== Track listings ==
Vinyl side one
No.	Title	Writer(s)	Length
1.	"I Am the Bullgod"	RJ Ritchie	5:09

Vinyl side two
No.	Title	Writer(s)	Length
2.	"My Oedipus Complex" (Remix)	RJ Ritchie	4:18

Cassette side one
No.	Title	Writer(s)	Length
1.	"I Am the Bullgod"	RJ Ritchie	4:59
2.	"My Oedipus Complex" (Remix)	RJ Ritchie	5:09
3.	"A Country Boy Can Survive"	Hank Williams Jr.	6:15

Cassette side two
No.	Title	Writer(s)	Length
4.	"Balls in Your Mouth"	RJ Ritchie	3:40
5.	"The Cramper"	RJ Ritchie	4:07
6.	"Rollin' On the Island" (featuring Prince Vince and Wes Chill)	RJ Ritchie	7:30

Promotional compact disc
No.	Title	Writer(s)	Length
1.	"I Am the Bullgod"	RJ Ritchie	4:50
2.	"A Country Boy Can Survive"	Hank Williams Jr.	4:55
3.	"My Oedipus Complex w/intro"	RJ Ritchie	4:49
4.	"My Oedipus Complex Remix"	RJ Ritchie	4:16
5.	"Prodigal Son" (Down and Dirty Remix)	RJ Ritchie	4:29

== Personnel ==
- Kid Rock – vocals, guitars, sequencing, bass, percussion
- Bob Ebeling – drums
- Andrew Nehra – guitar, bass, guiro, backing vocals
- Michael Nehra – solo guitar on "I Am the Bullgod"
- Chris Peters – guitar loop on "I Am the Bullgod"
- Mike E. Clark – loop on "The Cramper"
- Jon Slow – flute on "The Cramper"
- Dave Seymour – background guitar licks on "A Country Boy Can Survive"
- Prince Vince and Wes Chill – featured on "Rollin' On the Island"
