= Kid Rock (album) =

2003 album by Kid Rock

Studio album by Kid Rock
- Released: November 11, 2003
- Recorded: April–August 2003
- Studios: Allen Roadhouse, Clarkston, Michigan
- Genres: Southern rock; hard rock; country rock; hip-hop
- Length: 67:15
- Labels: Atlantic; Lava; Top Dog
- Producer: Kid Rock

Kid Rock chronology
Cocky (2001)	Kid Rock (2003)	Live Trucker (2006)

Singles from Kid Rock
- 1. "Feel Like Makin' Love" Released: October 2, 2003; 2. "Single Father" Released: 2004; 3. "Cold and Empty" Released: January 2004; 4. "Jackson, Mississippi" Released: January 2004; 5. "I Am" Released: July 2004

Kid Rock is the sixth studio album by the American musician Kid Rock, his fourth Atlantic Records album. It was released in 2003 and is his final release on Lava Records. It was critically acclaimed by Rolling Stone, which named it one of the 50 greatest albums of 2003. "Black Bob" and "Jackson, Mississippi" were recorded for his 1996 album Early Mornin' Stoned Pimp in 1995, but were left off the album. "Feel Like Makin' Love", "Cold and Empty", "Intro", "Hillbilly Stomp" and "Run Off to LA" were recorded for the demo sessions for 2001's Cocky, but did not make the cut as well. "Feel Like Makin' Love" originally had Sheryl Crow on the song. Country singer Kenny Chesney co-wrote "Cold and Empty".

The cover image was later reused for Rock's 2018 compilation album Greatest Hits: You Never Saw Coming.

== Release and promotion ==
The album's lead single was a cover of Bad Company's "Feel Like Makin' Love". It was released to radio on October 2, 2003, and peaked at number 33 on the Mainstream Rock chart. The song was performed on The Tonight Show, Big In 03 Awards and the American Music Awards for its promotional push. The promotional push was capped off by the VH-1 Special A Kid Rock Christmas. Rock embarked on the Rock N Roll Pain Train Tour. In January 2004, Rock released "Jackson, Mississippi" to rock stations and "Cold and Empty" to AC and Pop stations. "Jackson" peaked at number 14 on the Mainstream Rock chart while "Cold and Empty" peaked at number 20 on the AC chart. The song failed to chart on either the Top 40 or Hot 100. "Cold And Empty" was used on the WB's Smallville. In July 2004, Rock released the acoustic ballad "I Am" to rock radio and "Single Father", a cover of David Allan Coe, to country radio. "I Am" peaked at number 28 on the Mainstream Rock chart and was performed on The Tonight Show and Last Call. "Single Father" would become Kid Rock's second charting country song, after "Picture", peaking at number 50. Kid Rock was criticized at Super Bowl 38 for wearing the American flag as a poncho. The incident was overshadowed by Janet Jackson and Justin Timberlake and "Nipplegate".

== Critical reception ==
Professional ratings
Aggregate scores
Source	Rating
Metacritic	71/100
Review scores
Source	Rating
AllMusic	4.5/5 stars
Blender	2/5 stars
E! Online	B+
Entertainment Weekly	B−
IGN	6.9/10
Q	3.5/5 stars
RapReviews	3/10
Rolling Stone	4/5 stars
The Rolling Stone Album Guide	3/5 stars
The Village Voice	C+

According to the review aggregator Metacritic, Kid Rock received "generally favorable reviews" based on a weighted average score of 71 out of 100 from 7 critic scores.

== Track listing ==
No.	Title	Writer(s)	Length
1.	"Rock N Roll Pain Train"	Robert James Ritchie	5:52
2.	"Cadillac Pussy" (written as "Cadillac P***y" on clean version)	Robert James Ritchie	3:12
3.	"Feel Like Makin' Love"	Paul Rodgers, Mick Ralphs	5:08
4.	"Black Bob"	Robert James Ritchie, Matthew Shafer, James Trombly	5:31
5.	"Jackson, Mississippi"	Robert James Ritchie, James Trombly	4:31
6.	"Cold and Empty"	Robert James Ritchie, Kenny Chesney, Matthew Shafer, Mark Tamburino, James Trombly	4:22
7.	"Intro"	Robert James Ritchie, Lawrence Smith, Joseph Simmons, Darryl McDaniels	2:04
8.	"Rock N Roll"	Robert James Ritchie, Stefanie Eulinberg, Jason Edward Krause, Mark McGrath, Kenny Olson, James Trombly	4:28
9.	"Hillbilly Stomp"	Robert James Ritchie, Frederick Beauregard, Matthew Shafer	4:21
10.	"I Am"	Robert James Ritchie, Arthur Penhallow Jr., Huck Johns, Christian Wojcik	5:03
11.	"Son Of Detroit"	Ronnie Brooks, Thomas G. De Luca, Harold Eugene Tipton, David Allan Coe	4:21
12.	"Do It For You"	Robert James Ritchie, James Trombly	4:26
13.	"Hard Night For Sarah"	Bob Seger	4:13
14.	"Run Off To LA"	Robert James Ritchie, Sheryl Crow	5:16
15.	"Single Father"	David Allan Coe	4:27

== Credits ==
- Kid Rock – vocals, acoustic guitar, lead guitar, rhythm guitar, steel guitar, slide guitar, banjo, Mellotron, dobro, percussion, turntables
- Kenny Olson – lead guitar
- Jason Krause – lead guitar, rhythm guitar, acoustic guitar
- Aaron Julison – bass guitar
- Jimmie "Bones" Trombly – piano, electric piano, keyboards, organ, Wurlitzer, harmonica, jaw harp, programming
- Stefanie Eulinberg – drums, percussion
- Lauren Creamer – background vocals
- Karen Newman – background vocals
- Thornetta Davis – background vocals
- Misty Love – background vocals
- Shirley Hayden – background vocals
- Hank Williams Jr. – vocals on "Cadillac Pussy"
- Johnny Evans – saxophone on "Cadillac Pussy"
- Kenny Wayne Shepherd – lead guitar on "Black Bob"
- David McMurray – saxophone (tenor) on "Black Bob"
- Larry Nozero – saxophone (baritone) on "Black Bob"
- Raye Biggs – trumpet on "Black Bob"
- Billy Gibbons – vocals on "Hillbilly Stomp"
- Sheryl Crow – vocals on "Run Off to LA"
- Bob Ebeling – drums on "Jackson, Mississippi"

== Charts ==
=== Weekly charts ===
Chart (2003)	Peak position
US Billboard 200	8

=== Year-end charts ===
Chart (2004)	Position
US Billboard 200	67

== Certifications ==
Region	Certification	Certified units/sales
Canada (Music Canada)	Gold	50,000^{^}
United States (RIAA)	Platinum	1,000,000^{^}
^{^} Shipments figures based on certification alone.
