= Bolt Upright =

American rap rock music group

- Origin: Hollywood, California, United States
- Genres: Rap rock
- Years active: 1996-2001
- Label: Sony 550 Music
- Members: Toriono "DJ Tory Tee" Mayek; Damian Valentine Mayek; David Aguirre; Jeff "Heff" Holter; DJ Johnny Love.

Bolt Upright was an American rap rock music group from Hollywood, California, United States, who were signed to Sony 550 Music.

== History ==
Brothers Toriono and Damien Mayek grew up in Milwaukee, Wisconsin. Toriono began DJing at 13 years old, and began producing hip hop records at 15. He produced the album for his own group, Def Supreme, during this time.

In 1996, both brothers moved to Los Angeles, California and formed Bolt Upright. The band signed to Sony's 550 Music in 1998 and released a five-track self-titled EP.

The band released its first and only LP Red Carpet Sindrome in 1999, and performed shows alongside Kid Rock, Powerman 5000, Kottonmouth Kings, Staind and Everlast.

Bolt Upright disbanded in 2001.

The Mayek brothers still work in music. Damien operates a music production company named Damien Valentine Music. Toriono still uses the name Tory Tee as a DJ and is represented by DJ Factory Management Group and Hollywood & Vinyl Records.

== Discography ==
- Self-Titled EP (1998)
- Red Carpet Sindrome (1999)
