= A Country Boy Can Survive =

Song by Hank Williams Jr.

Single by Hank Williams Jr.

from the album The Pressure Is On
- B-side: "Weatherman"
- Released: January 18, 1982
- Recorded: 1981
- Genre: Country
- Length: 4:16
- Label: Elektra/Curb
- Songwriter: Hank Williams Jr.
- Producers: Jimmy Bowen; Hank Williams Jr.

Hank Williams Jr. singles chronology
"All My Rowdy Friends (Have Settled Down)" (1981)	"A Country Boy Can Survive" (1982)	"Honky Tonkin'" (1982)

"A Country Boy Can Survive" is a song written and recorded by American musician Hank Williams Jr. The song was released as a single in January 1982 and reached a peak of number 2 on the Billboard Hot Country Singles chart in March 1982. It is considered one of Williams' signature songs, being certified 5× Platinum by RIAA, even though it never reached number one.

Shortly after 9/11, Williams re-wrote and re-recorded the song with a patriotic theme under the name "America Will Survive"; the rewrite peaked at number 45 on the Billboard country charts.

In early 2007 Williams re-released the original version to commemorate the 25th anniversary of its original release, in addition to creating a music video for it. This re-release peaked at number 47 on the Billboard country charts.

== Content ==
This song was released in January 1982. It reflects changes to American lifestyle and society that corresponded with rural concerns of the negative impact from increasing urbanization, and exalts the self-reliance of 'country boys'.

== Cover versions ==
Country music singer Toby Keith covered the song from the television special CMT Giants: Hank Williams Jr.

The second verse mentions the narrator's relationship with a New York City businessman; despite their differing backgrounds (urban vs. rural) the two had become good friends and exchanged gifts ("he'd send me pictures of the Broadway nights/And I'd send him some homemade wine"). The businessman is "killed by a man with a switchblade knife/for $43 my friend lost his life"; Williams replies that he would like to personally shoot the mugger himself, but not before "(spitting) Beech-Nut in that dude's eyes". The "America Will Survive" remix has the businessman being a victim of the 9/11 attacks.

== Chart history ==
=== Original version ===
Chart (1982)	Peak position
US Hot Country Songs (Billboard)	2
Canadian RPM Country Tracks	2

=== Year-end charts ===
Chart (1982)	Position
US Hot Country Songs (Billboard)	9

=== 2001 re-release as "America Will Survive" ===
Chart (2001)	Peak position
U.S. Billboard Hot Country Singles & Tracks	45

=== 2007 re-release for 25th Anniversary ===
Chart (2007)	Peak position
U.S. Billboard Hot Country Singles & Tracks	47

== Certifications ==
Region	Certification	Certified units/sales
United States (RIAA)	5× Platinum	5,000,000^{‡}
^{‡} Sales+streaming figures based on certification alone.

== Cover versions ==
Kid Rock recorded a cover of the song, which appeared on the 1993 EP Fire It Up, and as a B-side to his 1993 single "I Am the Bullgod". Joe Nichols recorded a version on his 2024 album, Honky Tonks & Country Songs.

=== Chad Brock version (Y2K version) ===
"A Country Boy Can Survive (Y2K version)"

Single by Chad Brock, Hank Williams, Jr., and George Jones

from the album Yes!
- B-side: "Going the Distance"
- Released: November 22, 1999
- Genre: Country
- Length: 3:59
- Label: Warner Bros. Nashville
- Songwriters: Hank Williams, Jr.
- Producers: Buddy Cannon; Norro Wilson

Chad Brock singles chronology
"Lightning Does the Work" (1999)	"A Country Boy Can Survive" (1999)	"Yes!" (2000)

Hank Williams, Jr. singles chronology
"I Ain't Goin' Peacefully" (1995)	"A Country Boy Can Survive" (1999)	"America Will Survive" (2001)

George Jones singles chronology
"Choices" (1999)	"A Country Boy Can Survive" (1999)	"Sinners and Saints" (2000)

In late 1999, Chad Brock and George Jones collaborated with Williams to record a re-written version of the song with a Y2K theme, with lines such as "If the bank machines crash, we'll be just fine." This version peaked at number 30 on the Billboard country charts, and number 75 on the Billboard Hot 100.

=== Chart positions ===
Chart (1999)	Peak position
Canada Country Singles (RPM)	66
US Billboard Hot 100	75
US Hot Country Songs (Billboard)	30
