= I Am (Kid Rock song) =

Single by Kid Rock

from the album Kid Rock
- Released: 2004
- Studio: Allen Roadhouse
- Genre: Rock
- Length: 4:34 (single version); 5:02 (album version)
- Label: Atlantic
- Songwriters: Huck Johns, RJ Ritchie, Arthur Penhallow Jr., C. Wojcik,
- Producer: Kid Rock

Kid Rock singles chronology
"Jackson, Mississippi" (2004)	"I Am" (2004)	"So Hott" (2007)

"I Am" is a song by American singer Kid Rock. It was released as the fourth single from his 2003 self-titled album and with no music video, it peaked at number 28 on the Billboard Mainstream Rock chart.

== Content ==
The song is about how he is anti-Hollywood and that he's not a fake. It was co-written by Arthur Penhallow Jr, C. Wojcik, and a local artist from Detroit, Michigan, Huck Johns.

Current lead guitarist Marlon Young appeared on the song. He would become Kid Rock's full-time replacement for Kenny Olson on lead guitar in 2008. He plays electric guitar on the song.

== Track listing ==
1. "I Am" (Radio Edit) - 4:32
2. "I Am" (Album version) - 5:02

== Charts ==
Chart (2004)	Peak position
US Mainstream Rock (Billboard)	28
