= I Am the Bullgod =

Song by Kid Rock

Single by Kid Rock

from the album The Polyfuze Method
- B-side: "My Oedipus Complex"; "A Country Boy Can Survive"
- Released: December 1993
- Recorded: 1992
- Studio: The Tempermill, Ferndale, Michigan
- Genre: Rap metal; rap rock; Southern rock; stoner rock
- Length: 4:50
- Label: Top Dog
- Songwriter: RJ Ritchie
- Producers: Kid Rock; Andrew Nehra; Michael Nehra; Mike E. Clark; D-Square

Kid Rock singles chronology
"Back from the Dead" (1993)	"I Am the Bullgod" (1993)	"Prodigal Son" (1994)

Music video
- "I Am the Bullgod" on YouTube

"I Am the Bullgod" is a song by Kid Rock, first released in 1993 on the UK compact disc and vinyl releases of The Polyfuze Method, and later appearing on his 1998 breakout album Devil Without a Cause.

== Composition ==
"I Am the Bullgod", according to AXS, was a tribute to the band Monster Magnet. The song's composition has been described as rap metal, rap rock, stoner rock and Southern rock with elements of funk. It has been described as a cross between Alice in Chains and Public Enemy.

== Release history ==
The song first appeared on the UK compact disc and vinyl releases of The Polyfuze Method, replacing the song "Desperate-Rado", followed by a 1993 vinyl single under the name Fire It Up, which was released as an extended play on cassette and compact disc. In 1998, the vocals were re-recorded for Kid Rock's fourth studio album, Devil Without a Cause, where one line was changed in the song ("I would like to learn but I can't be taught" to "You can bid all day but I can't be bought").

This version of the song is featured in the EA Sports American football video game Madden NFL 10.

== 1993 single ==
=== Track listings ===
Vinyl side one
No.	Title	Writer(s)	Length
1.	"I Am the Bullgod"	RJ Ritchie	5:09

Vinyl side two
No.	Title	Writer(s)	Length
2.	"My Oedipus Complex" (remix)	RJ Ritchie	4:18

Cassette side one
No.	Title	Writer(s)	Length
1.	"I Am the Bullgod"	RJ Ritchie	4:59
2.	"My Oedipus Complex" (remix)	RJ Ritchie	5:09
3.	"A Country Boy Can Survive"	Hank Williams Jr.	6:15

Cassette side two
No.	Title	Writer(s)	Length
4.	"Balls in Your Mouth"	RJ Ritchie	3:40
5.	"The Cramper"	RJ Ritchie	4:07
6.	"Rollin' On the Island" (featuring Prince Vince and Wes Chill)	RJ Ritchie	7:30

Promotional compact disc
No.	Title	Writer(s)	Length
1.	"I Am the Bullgod"	RJ Ritchie	4:50
2.	"A Country Boy Can Survive"	Hank Williams Jr.	4:55
3.	"My Oedipus Complex" (w/intro)	RJ Ritchie	4:49
4.	"My Oedipus Complex" (remix)	RJ Ritchie	4:16
5.	"Prodigal Son" (Down and Dirty remix)	RJ Ritchie	4:29

== 1998 single ==
"I Am the Bullgod"

Single by Kid Rock

from the album Devil Without a Cause
- Released: November 23, 1998
- Studio: The White Room (1998) and Temper Mill Studios (1992), Detroit, Michigan
- Genre: Rap metal; rap rock; Southern rock; stoner rock
- Length: 4:50
- Label: Atlantic
- Songwriter: RJ Ritchie
- Producer: Kid Rock

Kid Rock singles chronology
"Welcome 2 the Party (Ode 2 the Old School)" (1998)	"I Am the Bullgod" (1998)	"Bawitdaba" (1999)

Music video
- "I Am the Bullgod" on YouTube

=== Track listing ===
No.	Title	Writer(s)	Length
1.	"I Am the Bullgod" (radio edit)	RJ Ritchie	4:10
2.	"Where U at Rock" (album version)	RJ Ritchie	4:24
3.	"I Am the Bullgod" (album version)	RJ Ritchie	4:50

==== Charts ====
Chart (1999)	Peak position
U.S. Billboard Mainstream Rock Tracks	31

== Personnel ==
- Kid Rock – vocals, guitars, sequencing, bass, percussion
- Bob Ebeling – drums
- Andrew Nehra – guitar, bass, guiro, backing vocals
- Michael Nehra – solo guitar on "I Am the Bullgod"
- Chris Peters – guitar loop on "I Am the Bullgod"
- Mike E. Clark – loop on "The Cramper"
- Jon Slow – flute on "The Cramper"
- Dave Seymour – background guitar licks on "A Country Boy Can Survive"
- Prince Vince and Wes Chill – featured on "Rollin' On the Island"
