= Cold and Empty =

Single by Kid Rock

from the album Kid Rock
- Released: January 2004
- Studio: Allen Roadhouse
- Genre: Country, Southern rock
- Length: 4:22
- Label: Atlantic
- Songwriters: Robert James Ritchie, Kenny Chesney, Matthew Shafer, James Trombly, Mark Tamburino
- Producer: Kid Rock

Kid Rock singles chronology
"Single Father" (2004)	"Cold and Empty" (2004)	"Jackson, Mississippi" (2004)

Music video
- "Cold and Empty" on YouTube

"Cold and Empty" is a song by American singer Kid Rock. It was released in January 2004 as the second single from his 2003 self-titled album. The song was a strait-laced piano ballad about losing a love to the road life. It peaked at number 20 on the Billboard Adult Contemporary charts in 2004. The song was co-written by country singer Kenny Chesney.

== Music video ==
The music video, directed by The Malloys, was done in a split screen telling two stories. The one story has the current rock star life story of Kid Rock. The other shows the story of if he failed at the music career struggling to make ends meet and being evicted.

== Track listing ==
1. "Cold and Empty" (Alternate Version)
2. "Cold and Empty" (Radio Edit)

== Charts ==
Chart (2004)	Peak position
U.S. Billboard Hot Adult Contemporary Tracks	20
