= Jackson, Mississippi (song) =

Single by Kid Rock

from the album Kid Rock
- Released: January 2004
- Studio: Allen Roadhouse
- Genre: Southern rock
- Length: 4:31
- Label: Atlantic
- Songwriters: RJ Ritchie, James Trombly
- Producer: Kid Rock

Kid Rock singles chronology
"Cold and Empty" (2004)	"Jackson, Mississippi" (2004)	"I Am" (2004)

Music video
- "Jackson, Mississippi" on YouTube

"Jackson, Mississippi" is a song from Kid Rock's 2003 self-titled album. The song is about a man dealing with addiction and the effects it is having on a relationship. The song was a demo in 1995 for his album Early Morning Stoned Pimp. It was released as a dual single in January 2004 along with "Cold and Empty." It peaked at #14 on the Mainstream Rock tracks. His original drummer for Twisted Brown Trucker and Eminem producer Bob Eubling plays drums on the song. A live version was released on the Best Buy exclusive version of 2007's Rock N Roll Jesus. His 2008 National Guard song "Warrior" is a rewrite of Jackson, Mississippi. It uses the same musical structure of the song. He made a music video for "Warrior", featuring NASCAR racer Dale Earnhardt Jr. and was shown at movie theatres throughout the summer of 2008.

== Track listing ==
1. "Jackson, Mississippi" (Radio Edit)
2. "Jackson, Mississippi" (Album Version)

== Charts ==
Chart (2004)	Peak position
U.S. Billboard Mainstream Rock Tracks	14
