= The Polyfuze Method =

Studio album by Kid Rock
- Released: March 16, 1993
- Recorded: 1992–1993
- Studios: Tempermill Studio, Ferndale, Michigan
- Genres: Rap rock; rap metal; hip-hop
- Length: 58:52
- Labels: Continuum; Top Dog
- Producers: Kid Rock; D-Square; Mike E. Clark

Kid Rock chronology
Grits Sandwiches for Breakfast (1990)	The Polyfuze Method (1993)	Fire It Up (1993)

Singles from The Polyfuze Method
- 1. "Back from the Dead" Released: May 24, 1993; 2. "U Don't Know Me" Released: December 29, 1993; 3. "I Am the Bullgod" Released: December 1993; 4. "Prodigal Son" Released: March 11, 1994

The Polyfuze Method is the second studio album by the American musician Kid Rock. Released on March 16, 1993 by Continuum and Top Dog Records, the album marked the beginning of Kid Rock's shift from hip-hop to a more rock-oriented sound; it also further developed his "trailer-park pimp-daddy persona".

== Recording ==
In 1989, Kid Rock signed with Jive Records and released his debut album, Grits Sandwiches for Breakfast the following year. Despite the album's success, he was dropped by Jive, and in 1992, signed with Detroit independent record label Continuum. The following year, he recorded his second studio album, The Polyfuze Method, with producer Mike E. Clark.

== Artistry ==
The Polyfuze Method shows Kid Rock developing a rap rock sound. The Village Voice writer Chaz Kangas described Kid Rock on this album as having "a love and mastery of Paul's Boutique-esque sample-collage based production". Producer Mike E. Clark worked with Kid Rock to help give the album more of a rock-oriented sound than his debut, utilizing live heavy metal guitars and sampling rock artists like Pink Floyd and Butthole Surfers, as well as hiring a flute player to perform on the album. The album served as a crossroads between his hip hop and rock career, still maintaining a strong hip hop sound carried over from Grits Sandwiches for Breakfast, while beginning Kid Rock's use of rock and roll and country influences via sampling. A 2017 profile by Billboard categorized the album as being defined by "trippy AOR samples".

According to Allmusic's Johnny Loftus, The Polyfuze Method "represents a significant leap forward not only in the development of Kid Rock's unlikely mixture of classic rock, hip-hop, and country influences, but his own trailer-park pimp-daddy persona." Steve "Flash" Juon of RapReviews described the album's music as a cross between Schoolly D and Beastie Boys. Loftus feels the music on The Polyfuze Method was influenced by Public Enemy and N.W.A. He describes "Killin' Brain Cells" as being categorized by "big percussion and a funky guitar sample", and that the song's lyrics were defined by "the confluence of blind bravado, hard liquor"—these characteristics, along with the mixture of rock and hip hop, foreshadowed Kid Rock's 1998 multiplatinum major label album Devil Without a Cause, according to Loftus.

Chaz Kangas, writing for The Village Voice, said that The Polyfuze Method displays "his approach’s metamorphosis into painting with broad strokes of other genres in his work". "Prodigal Son", an autobiographical song, lyrically describes Kid Rock leaving his family home to pursue a music career. Kangas wrote that "In retrospect, the song today almost sounds like his outlaw manifesto." The song "Fuck U Blind" contained live guitars, which was not typical of the era's hip-hop. Juon described "In So Deep" as being "somewhere between Seattle's grunge sound and the proto-rap style of Suicidal Tendencies". Atypical of the album's sound was the more commercial-sounding "U Don't Know Me", which Kid Rock recorded as a joke to prove that "anyone can [write a pop song]".

== Release and reception ==
Professional ratings
Review scores
Source	Rating
AllMusic	3/5 stars
RapReviews	6.5/10

Kid Rock titled the album The Polyfuze Method after a line in a HairClub commercial. He intended to film a music video for the song "Prodigal Son". However, Continuum Records dissuaded him against doing so, in favor of a video for the more commercial-sounding "U Don't Know Me", which the label had put out as a single and on the album without Kid Rock's knowledge or approval. The video cost $30,000 to produce. With the production of the "Back from the Dead" music video, Kid Rock was given more creative control, being allowed to produce and direct the video. At $1,500, the video also cost less than the "U Don't Know Me" video. After signing with Atlantic Records, Kid Rock licensed The Polyfuze Method to the label. The album was not offered for sale when Kid Rock's catalog became available on iTunes.

The album received mixed reviews upon release. In a retrospective review, Allmusic's Johnny Loftus gave the album three out of five stars, writing, "Despite its strong suggestion of what was to come, Polyfuze Method doesn't really go anywhere." The Village Voice praised the album's sample-based sound and called the song "Prodigal Son" a "classic". Steve "Flash" Juon of RapReviews wrote, "The old cliche is that you can’t make an omelette without breaking some eggs first, and Kid Rock went into the hen house with a frying pan and a guitar and started smashing everything in sight. It’s messy at times but at least it’s interesting."

== Track listing ==
1993 United States release
No.	Title	Length
1.	"Fred" (skit)	0:25
2.	"Killin' Brain Cells"	3:55
3.	"Prodigal Son"	5:18
4.	"The Cramper"	4:12
5.	"3 Sheets to the Wind"	4:43
6.	"Fuck U Blind"	3:55
7.	"Desperate-Rado"	4:25
8.	"Back from the Dead"	4:43
9.	"My Oedipus Complex"	5:35
10.	"Balls in Your Mouth"	3:48
11.	"Trippin' with Dick Vitale"	4:07
12.	"TV Dinner" (skit)	0:47
13.	"Pancake Breakfast"	3:02
14.	"Blow Me"	2:31
15.	"In So Deep"	1:59
16.	"U Don't Know Me"	5:25
Total length:		58:52

The UK CD and vinyl replaced "Desperate-Rado" with "I Am the Bullgod", added the track "Rollin' on the Island" and removed the tracks "Back from the Dead", "Blow Me", and "TV Dinner". The 1997 reissue The Polyfuze Method Revisited (1997) combined the track listings of the US and UK releases, and added a remix of the skit "Fred", and the song "Rain Check", which did not appear on any release of the original album.

"Prodigal Son", "3 Sheets to the Wind", "Fuck U Blind" and "My Oedipus Complex" were re-recorded for the compilation The History of Rock, while "I Am the Bullgod" was re-recorded for the album Devil Without a Cause.

== Personnel ==
- Bob Ebeling – drums
- Bill Grant – bass guitar, guitar
- Kid Rock – guitar, loops, bass guitar, producer
- Chris Peters – guitar, bass guitar
- Dono Zoyes – bass guitar
- Jon Slow – flute
- Peg Leg Sam – harmonica
- Mike Henry – guitar on "In So Deep"
- D-Square – producer
- Mike E. Clark – producer
