= Rap metal =

Music genre

- Stylistic origins: Heavy metal; hip-hop; rap rock; alternative metal; funk metal
- Cultural origins: 1980s, United States
- Typical instruments: Vocals; electric guitar; bass guitar; drums; samplers; turntables
- Derivative forms: Nu metal; trap metal

Rap metal is a fusion genre that combines hip-hop with heavy metal. It usually consists of heavy metal guitar riffs, funk metal elements, rapped vocals and sometimes turntables.

== History ==
=== Origins and early development (1980s–early 1990s) ===
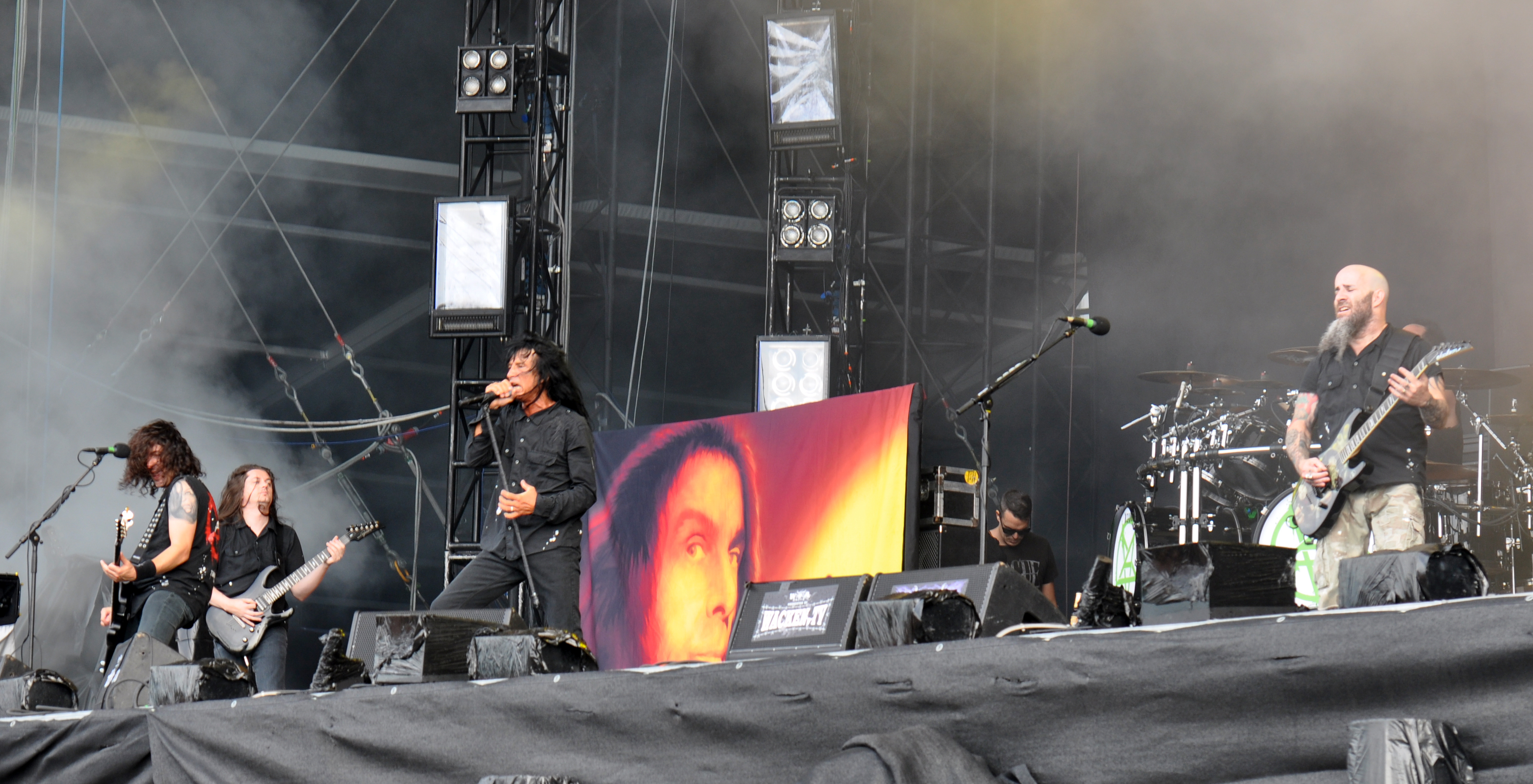
With the release of its extended play I'm the Man, Anthrax (pictured) is considered one of the pioneers of rap metal.

Rap metal's roots are based both in hip-hop acts who sampled heavy metal music, such as Beastie Boys, Cypress Hill, Esham and Run-DMC, and rock bands who fused heavy metal and hip-hop influences, such as 24-7 Spyz and Faith No More.

Scott Ian of Anthrax (who helped pioneer the genre) believes Rage Against the Machine invented the genre.

In 1987, the heavy metal band Anthrax fused hip-hop with heavy metal for their extended play I'm the Man. The next year rapper Sir Mix-a-Lot teamed up with Metal Church for his 1988 single "Iron Man", from his debut album Swass, loosely based upon the Black Sabbath song of the same name. Rap metal can be found in a track from the industrial metal band Ministry in their 1989 album The Mind Is a Terrible Thing to Taste on the track "Test" for which they hired rappers The Grand Wizard (K. Lite) and The Slogan God (Tommie Boyskee) to perform vocals. In 1990, the rapper Ice-T formed a heavy metal band called Body Count, and while performing at the 1991 Lollapalooza tour performed a set that was half rap songs and half metal songs. Stuck Mojo and Clawfinger, both formed in 1989, are considered to be another two pioneers of the genre. Anthrax in 1991 teamed up with Public Enemy for a remake of the latter's "Bring the Noise" that fused hip-hop with thrash metal. Also in 1991, the thrash metal band Tourniquet featured the hip-hop group P.I.D. on the song "Spineless" from their album Psycho Surgery. That same year the hair metal band Whitecross featured a rap by Alton Hood of the hip-hop group D.O.C. on their album In The Kingdom.

=== Rise in popularity (1990s–early 2000s) ===
In the 1990s, rap metal became a popular style of music. For instance, the band Faith No More's song "Epic" was a major success and peaked at number 9 on the Billboard Hot 100. 1993 saw the release of the Judgment Night soundtrack that featured numerous collaborations between rappers, musicians and rock and metal group of bands. Rage Against the Machine's 1996 album Evil Empire entered the Billboard 200 at number one, and in 1999, their third studio album, The Battle of Los Angeles, also debuted in top spot in the Billboard 200, selling 430,000 copies in its first week. Each of the band's albums became at least platinum hits. Biohazard played on the Ozzfest mainstage alongside Ozzy Osbourne, Slayer, Danzig, Fear Factory, and Sepultura. In support of the album, Biohazard embarked on a short co-headlining tour of Europe with Suicidal Tendencies.

On August 18, 1998, Atlantic released rap metal musician Kid Rock's Devil Without a Cause behind the single "Welcome 2 the Party (Ode 2 the Old School)" and Kid Rock went on the Vans Warped Tour to support the album. Sales of "Welcome 2 The Party" and Devil Without a Cause were slow, though the 1998 Warped Tour in Northampton, Massachusetts stimulated regional interest in Massachusetts and New England. This led to substantial airplay of the single "I Am The Bullgod" during the summer and fall of 1998 on Massachusetts rock staples WZLX and WAAF. In early December 1998, while DJing at a club, he met and became friends with MTV host Carson Daly. He talked Daly into getting him a performance on MTV and on December 28, 1998, he performed on MTV Fashionably Loud in Miami, Florida, creating a buzz from his performance, even upstaging Jay-Z. In May, his sales began taking off with the third single "Bawitdaba" and by April 1999, Devil Without a Cause had achieved a gold disc. The following month, Devil, as he predicted, went platinum. Kid Rock's first major tour was Limptropolis, where he opened for Limp Bizkit with Staind. He solidified his superstardom with a Woodstock 1999 performance and on July 24 of that year, he was double platinum. The following single "Cowboy", a mix of southern rock, country, and rap, was an even bigger hit, making the Top 40. It even became the theme song of WCW's Jeff Jarrett. Rock's next single, the slow back porch blues ballad "Only God Knows Why", was the biggest hit off the album, charting at No. 19 on the Billboard Hot 100. It was one of the first songs to use the autotune effect. By the time the final single, "Wasting Time", was released, the album had sold 7 million copies. Devil Without a Cause was certified 11 times platinum by the RIAA on April 17, 2003. According to Nielsen SoundScan, as of 2013, actual sales are 9.3 million. Kid Rock was nominated as Best New Artist at the 2000 Grammy Awards, but lost to Christina Aguilera. He was nominated for "Bawitdaba" for Best Hard Rock Performance, but lost to Metallica's "Whiskey in the Jar". In 1998, Ice Cube released his long-awaited album War & Peace Vol. 1 (The War Disc) which had some elements of nu metal and rap metal on some tracks, even including the nu metal band Korn. The album debuted at No. 7 on the Billboard 200 chart, selling 180,000 copies in the first week.

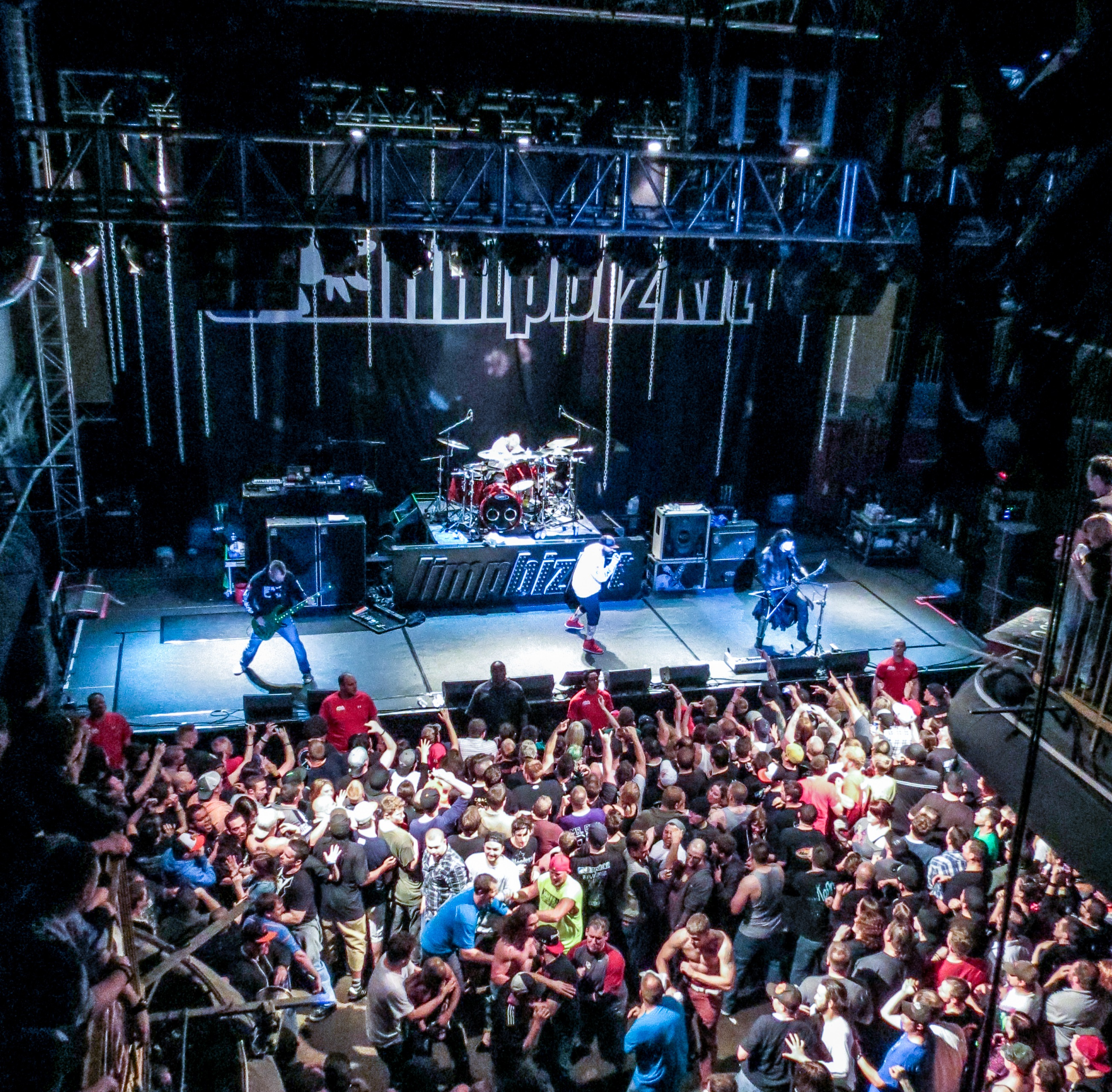
Rap metal band Limp Bizkit

It reached the height of its popularity during 1999, with the Port Huron Times-Herald describing the summer of that year as a "bipolar menu of harsh rap-metal and gooey teen pop." Around this time, the style started to attract criticism in the mainstream, particularly after the troubled Woodstock 1999 festival, which featured many artists associated with rap metal and nu/alternative metal, such as Kid Rock, Limp Bizkit, Rage Against the Machine and Reveille. Pop-punk musician Jeff Brogowski told The Morning Call newspaper in 1999 that "these macho rap-metal bands are just so mean-spirited. Look what happened at Woodstock (last summer). All the violence, looting and the fires. Something strange is going on. Maybe it has something do with all the economic prosperity. It's getting ugly like it was during the '80s, when so many people and bands were so cocky."

The nu/rap metal band Limp Bizkit's 1999 album Significant Other climbed to No. 1 on the Billboard 200, selling 643,874 copies in its first week of release. In its second week of release, the album sold an additional 335,000 copies. The band's follow-up album, Chocolate Starfish and the Hot Dog Flavored Water, set a record for highest week-one sales of a rock album with over one million copies sold in the U.S. in its first week of release, with 400,000 of those sales coming on its first day, making it the fastest-selling rock album ever, breaking the record held for 7 years by Pearl Jam's Vs. That same year, Papa Roach's major label debut Infest became a platinum hit; the album later sold over 3 million copies worldwide making it the band’s most successful album to date and making Papa Roach an influential act in the nu metal scene. Cypress Hill incorporated direct heavy metal influences into their 2000 album Skull & Bones, which featured six tracks in which rappers B-Real and Sen Dog were backed by a band including Fear Factory members Christian Olde Wolbers and Dino Cazares and Rage Against the Machine drummer Brad Wilk. B-Real also formed a rap metal group, Kush, with Wolbers, Fear Factory drummer Raymond Herrera and Deftones guitarist Stephen Carpenter. According to B-Real, Kush is more aggressive than other bands in the genre. SX-10, formed in 1996 by Sen Dog, also performs rap rock and rap metal.

In 2000, the rap metal band P.O.D.'s 1999 album The Fundamental Elements of Southtown went platinum and was the 143rd best-selling album of 2000. Late in 2000, Linkin Park released their debut album Hybrid Theory, which remains both the best-selling debut album by any artist in the 21st century, and the best-selling nu metal album of all time. The album was also the best-selling album in all genres in 2001, offsetting sales by prominent pop acts like Backstreet Boys and N'Sync, earning the band a Grammy Award for their second single "Crawling", with the fourth single, "In the End", released late in 2001, becoming one of the most recognized songs in the first decade of the 21st century. The rap rock band Crazy Town also broke into the mainstream success of nu metal with their 1999 album The Gift of Game, especially their number 1 hit single, "Butterfly", which peaked at number 1 on many charts including the Billboard Hot 100 during March 2001, remaining on the Hot 100 for 23 weeks. It also peaked at number 1 on the Modern Rock Tracks chart and the Hot Dance Singles chart as well as peaking number 6 on the Rhythmic Top 40, number 2 on the Top 40 Mainstream chart and number 4 on the Top 40 Tracks chart. Their album The Gift of Game peaked at number 9 on the Billboard 200. Worldwide the album sold more than 2.5 million units, with more than 1.5 million in the US alone. Also that year was Saliva's Every Six Seconds which was also a commercial success, debuting at no. 6 on the Billboard 200. In 2001, the band P.O.D.'s Satellite album went triple platinum and peaked at #6 on the Billboard 200 chart.

=== Decline (2010s) ===
Proyecto Eskhata, a Spanish band which debuted in 2012, has received much press coverage in Spain for its fusion of progressive rock and rap metal, which journalists have described as "progressive rap metal".

== Influence on other genres ==
=== Nu metal ===
Nu metal (also known as nü-metal and aggro-metal) is a genre that combines elements of heavy metal music with elements of other music genres such as hip-hop, funk, grunge and industrial. Nu metal bands have drawn elements and influences from a variety of musical styles, including rap metal and other heavy metal subgenres.

=== Trap metal ===
Trap metal
- Other names: Ragecore; death rap; industrial trap; scream rap
- Stylistic origins: Trap; heavy metal; industrial; nu metal
- Cultural origins: Early 2010s, United States
- Typical instruments: Vocals; drum machine (Roland TR-808); guitar (occasionally)

Other topics
- Digital hardcore; emo rap; cloud rap; distortion in music; industrial hip-hop; horrorcore; crunkcore

Trap metal (also known as ragecore, death rap, hardcore trap, industrial trap and scream rap) is a subgenre of trap music that features elements and inspiration from various metal and hardcore punk genres, as well as elements of other genres, like industrial and nu metal. It is characterized by distorted beats, hip-hop flows, harsh vocals, and can also sometimes feature guitar riffs that are either sampled, synthesized or recorded by an actual guitarist. Bones has been considered by Kerrang! to be one of the earliest practitioners of the genre, releasing tracks that could be considered "trap metal" beginning around 2014. British rapper Scarlxrd is often associated with the genre and is considered a pioneer of trap metal. WQHT described OG Maco's 2014 eponymous EP as being a part of the genre's early development. Other artists associated with trap metal include Dropout Kings, Bone Crew, Ghostemane, ZillaKami, Fever 333, Ho99o9, City Morgue, Kid Bookie, Kim Dracula, Backxwash, Banshee, Denzel Curry, and $uicideboy$, as well as the early careers of XXXTentacion, 6ix9ine and Ski Mask the Slump God.

The stylistic influences of trap metal vary widely, with some artists such as City Morgue and Ho99o9 drawing influence from hardcore punk, while other artists such as Ghostemane have pioneered their own sounds with influences from genres including gothic rock, industrial metal, black metal and emo.

== See also ==
- List of rap metal bands
- Rap rock
- Crunkcore
- Nu metal
