= Grits Sandwiches for Breakfast =

Studio album by Kid Rock
- Released: November 27, 1990
- Studios: Battery Studios, New York; One Little Indian Recording, El Cerrito, CA
- Genre: Hip-hop
- Length: 48:04
- Labels: Jive; RCA; Top Dog
- Producers: Kid Rock; Too Short; Dice Sound; the Blackman; Mike E. Clark

Kid Rock chronology
Grits Sandwiches for Breakfast (1990)	The Polyfuze Method (1993)

Singles from Grits Sandwiches for Breakfast
- 1. "Yo-Da-Lin in the Valley" Released: 1990

Grits Sandwiches for Breakfast is the debut studio album by the American musician Kid Rock. Released on November 27, 1990, by Jive Records, the album is marked by a straightforward hip-hop style, in contrast to the rock-oriented sound of his later albums. Jive found the album difficult to promote due to its explicit lyrics and focus on sex rhymes but upon release, it made Kid Rock one of Detroit hip-hop's most successful recording artists, selling over 100,000 copies.

== History ==
Kid Rock began his professional music career as a member of the hip-hop group the Beast Crew in the late 1980s. During this time, Kid Rock met rapper D-Nice, which led to Kid Rock opening at local shows for Boogie Down Productions. During this time, Kid Rock began his professional association with producer Mike E. Clark, who was initially skeptical of the idea of a white rapper, but was impressed by Kid Rock's performance; Kid Rock had prepared his own beats and used his own turntables to demonstrate his skills for Clark. In 1988, Clark produced a series of demos with Kid Rock, which led to offers from six major record labels, including Atlantic and CBS Records. With the help of D-Nice, Kid Rock signed with Jive Records at the age of 17, releasing his debut studio album, Grits Sandwiches for Breakfast in 1990, which featured production by D-Nice and Too Short. According to Kid Rock, the contract with Jive resulted in animosity from fellow rapper Vanilla Ice, who felt that he should have been signed.

== Artistry ==
In contrast to Kid Rock's later albums, Grits Sandwiches for Breakfast features a straightforward hip-hop sound. While the album primarily reflects what reviewers perceived as a strong influence from Beastie Boys and Too Short, "Grits Sandwiches nevertheless contains a few elements of the Bob Seger-loving, turntable-scratching dirt-ass pimp character who would later emerge as the American Bad Ass", according to AllMusic's Johnny Loftus. Other influences claimed by reviewers on the album's music include Run-DMC, LL Cool J and Rob Base. Steve "Flash" Juon of RapReviews said, "It certainly seems like a smart decision for the sake of his rap credibility for Kid Rock to focus on sexual exploits. As a white kid with rich parents he wasn’t going to have 'street cred' amongst the originators of the hip-hop arts, but people are always going to enjoy having sex regardless of race, color, creed or background. [...] If Kid Rock had tried to be meaner, harder, or more gangster than acts like Ice Cube he would have been laughed right out of the scene, but with 'non-commercial raps that run like Herschel Walker', his 'Style of X-Pression' made that rap connection." "With a One Two" samples the Doobie Brothers' "China Grove", predicting Kid Rock's later shift to rap rock.

== Release and aftermath ==
To promote the album, Kid Rock toured nationally with Ice Cube, D-Nice, Yo-Yo and Too Short; Detroit artist James "the Blackman" Harris was Kid Rock's DJ on this tour. During instore promotions for the album, Kid Rock met and developed a friendship with local rapper Eminem, who frequently challenged Kid Rock to rap battles. In May 1991, the Detroit Free Press reported that the album had become a local hit in Detroit record stores and clubs, with "Wax the Booty" receiving heavy radio requests after midnight. Grits Sandwiches for Breakfast eventually sold over 100,000 copies, signaling national success for the Kid Rock; the album's success made Kid Rock one of the two biggest rap stars in Detroit in 1991, along with local independent rapper Esham.

Despite the album's commercial success, Kid Rock felt it was underpromoted by Jive Records, citing its lack of music videos due to the "unprintable" lyrics on every song. The lead single, "Yo-Da-Lin in the Valley", which was about oral sex, proved to be controversial when WSUC-FM, a college radio station, was fined $23,700 by the FCC for playing it. Ultimately, unfavorable comparisons to Vanilla Ice led to Jive dropping Kid Rock, according to Mike E. Clark.

=== Critical reception ===
Professional ratings
Review scores
Source	Rating
AllMusic	2/5 stars
RapReviews	6/10
Robert Christgau	(dud)
Rolling Stone	2.5/5 stars
The Rolling Stone Album Guide	2.5/5 stars

In February 1991, Edward Hill of the Cleveland Plain Dealer wrote that the album "insultingly exploits everyday tenets of black life" and that it was "amazing that other rappers will tolerate this stupid a parody of their art form." Hill also derided the album's press release about Rock's background in Detroit, characterizing it as similar to the "pack of lies Vanilla Ice fed to the press before his middle class roots were exposed." The Grand Rapids Press singled out "New York Is Not My Home" and "Abdul Jabar Cut" as showing potential, but disliked the record's exaggerated profanity and misogyny, calling it a "sad example of the what kind of doors 2 Live Crew" had opened, and gave the album 1.5 stars out of 4.

Retrospective reviews have also looked unfavorably upon the album. Rolling Stone listed it as one of "20 terrible debut albums by great artists" and gave it two and a half out of five stars in its album guide. AllMusic's Johnny Loftus wrote that "despite Kid's distinct, hard-edged flow and references to the building blocks that would later make his career, Grits Sandwiches for Breakfast is a mostly laughable recording". Robert Christgau gave the album a "dud" rating. Steve "Flash" Juon of Rap Reviews wrote, "I'm not a fan of what Rock has become, but I respect his debut album, even as I firmly tell you that it’s not anything to go out of your way for. 'Yo-Da-Lin in the Valley' is amusing and unconventional enough to be worth revisiting, but the album is largely forgettable. The unfortunate truth is that Kid Rock fit in so well that he didn’t stand out." However, the album's music has also received praise from The Village Voice, which called the song "Wax the Booty" a "classic" in an article by Chaz Kangas, who called the track "smooth and sinister" and "a worthwhile tale of fornication from the era where sex in storytelling was king."

== Track listing ==
Side A
No.	Title	Producer(s)	Length
1.	"Yo-Da-Lin in the Valley"	Kid Rock; the Blackman (co.); Mike E. Clark (co.)	4:18
2.	"Genuine Article"	Kid Rock	4:42
3.	"Cramp Ya Style"	Kid Rock	4:19
4.	"New York's Not My Home"	Kid Rock	4:27
5.	"Super Rhyme Maker"	Too Short	3:37
6.	"With a One-Two"	Kid Rock	3:38
Total length:			24:58

Side B
No.	Title	Producer(s)	Length
7.	"Wax the Booty"	Too Short	5:20
8.	"Pimp of the Nation"	The Dice Sound	5:10
9.	"Abdul Jabar Cut"	Kid Rock	4:29
10.	"Step in Stride"	Kid Rock	3:24
11.	"The Upside" (featuring Roz Davis)	The Dice Sound	5:06
Total length:			23:06

CD bonus tracks
No.	Title	Producer(s)	Length
12.	"Style of X-Pression"	Kid Rock	4:20
13.	"Trippin' Over a Rock"	Kid Rock	3:11
Total length:			58:11

== Personnel ==
- Robert James Ritchie – Main Artist, Vocals, Producer (tracks: 1–4, 6, 9–10, 12–13), Mixing (tracks: 1–2, 4–13)
- Roz Davis – Vocals (track 11)
- Doug E. Doug – Talking (track 9)
- Patricia Halligan – Guitar (tracks: 4, 6, 9)
- David Bright – Keyboards (track 11)
- Keenan Foster – Keyboards programming (track 7)
- Joe Mendelson – Programming (track 3)
- Todd Anthony Shaw – Producer (tracks: 5, 7)
- The Dice Sound – Producer (tracks: 8, 11)
- The Blackman – Co-Producer (track 1)
- Mike E. Clark – Co-Producer (track 1)
- Barbera Aimes – Mixing (tracks: 1, 8, 13), Engineering
- Walter C. Griggs – Mixing (track 2)
- Derrick Jones – Mixing (tracks: 3, 12)
- Dwayne Sumal – Mixing (track 11), Engineering
- Al Eaton – Engineering
- Anthony Saunders – Engineering
- Chris Floberg – Engineering
- Eric Gast – Engineering
- Sherman Foote – Engineering
- Tim Latham – Engineering
- Tom Vercillo – Engineering
- Tom Coyne – Mastering
- Todd James – Artwork
- Michael Benabib – Photography
