= Bawitdaba =

1999 single by Kid Rock

Single by Kid Rock

from the album Devil Without a Cause
- B-side: "My Oedipus Complex"; "Prodigal Son"; "Paid"
- Released: February 15, 1999
- Studio: White Room, Temple of the Dog (Detroit, Michigan)
- Genre: Nu metal; rap metal; hard rock
- Length: 4:26 (album version); 3:32 (radio edit)
- Label: Atlantic; Lava; Top Dog
- Songwriters: R. J. Ritchie; Matthew Shafer; Jason Krause
- Producer: Kid Rock

Kid Rock singles chronology
"I Am the Bullgod" (1998)	"Bawitdaba" (1999)	"Cowboy" (1999)

Audio sample
- file; help

Music video
- "Bawitdaba" on YouTube

"Bawitdaba" is a song by American musician Kid Rock from his fourth album Devil Without a Cause. It was released as a single in 1999, helping push the success of the album. It has since become one of Kid Rock's most popular songs, receiving critical praise and entering the top 10 of the US Billboard Modern Rock Tracks chart, as well as the New Zealand Singles Chart.

== Background ==
"Bawitdaba" has been described as having a nu metal, rap metal and hard rock sound. Its chorus has been described as a "neo-gregorian drone"; this chorus was derived from hip hop chants, such as the refrain from the Sugar Hill Gang's "Rapper's Delight". The lyrics of the song are dedicated to "the shots of Jack", "chicks with beepers", as well as "all the crackheads, the critics, the cynics / And all my heroes in the methadone clinic."

On the demo recording of the song, Kid Rock shouts, "Now get in the pit and try to kill someone!" For the album version, he replaced "kill" with "love." Kid Rock told The Baltimore Sun that he was glad he had changed the lyric, explaining that mosh pits are about coexistence.

== Reception ==
Critics and fans consider "Bawitdaba" to be one of Kid Rock's best songs. In 2009, it was named the 47th best hard rock song of all time by VH1. The song was nominated for the 2000 Grammy Awards in the Best New Artist and Best Hard Rock Performance categories.

== Music video ==
The song's accompanying video gained regular rotation on MTV as it grew in popularity. The video opens with numerous clips of backstage touring footage featuring members of Korn, in addition Fred Durst and Sam Rivers of Limp Bizkit. The video depicts Kid Rock and his band performing in a trailer park with numerous children playing football with Joe C. in the background. As the video progresses, it features shots of Kid Rock driving a large Cadillac as he is accompanied by numerous women. The video then cuts to the band performing the song's breakdown in a darkened field in front of a large mosh pit.

== Track listings ==
UK CD1

1. "Bawitdaba" (radio edit) – 3:32
2. "My Oedipus Complex" (Father edit) – 3:51
3. "My Oedipus Complex" (Son edit) – 4:28
4. "Bawitdaba" (enhanced video)

UK CD2

1. "Bawitdaba" (radio edit) – 3:32
2. "Cowboy" (album version) – 4:16
3. "Prodigal Son" (album version) – 5:41
4. "Cowboy" (video)

UK CD3

1. "Bawitdaba" (radio edit) – 3:32
2. "I Am the Bullgod" (album version) – 4:50
3. "Paid" (album version) – 4:45
4. "I Am the Bullgod" (video)

European and Australian CD single

1. "Bawitdaba" (edit) – 3:32
2. "Bawitdaba" (album version) – 4:25
3. "I Am the Bullgod" (live, electro-acoustic version) – 5:28

== Credits and personnel ==
Credits are lifted from the UK CD1 and Devil Without a Cause liner notes.

Studios

- Recorded at White Room Studios and Temple of the Dog (Detroit, Michigan)
- Mixed at Abbey Road Studios (London, England)
- Mastered at Masterdisk (New York City)

Musicians

- Kid Rock – writing (as R. J. Ritchie), vocals, production, mixing, engineering
- Twisted Brown Trucker – assistant engineering
  - Uncle Kracker – writing (as Matthew Shafer), turntables
  - Jason Krause – writing, metal guitar
  - Kenny Olson – lead guitar
  - Jimmie Bones – keyboards
  - Stefanie Eulinberg – drums

Other personnel

- John Travis – additional production, engineering
- David Bottrill – mixing
- Al Sutton – engineering
- Derek Matuja – assistant engineering
- Tony Dawsey – mastering

== Charts ==
=== Weekly charts ===
Weekly chart performance for "Bawitdaba"
Chart (1999–2001)	Peak position
Germany (GfK)	84
New Zealand (Recorded Music NZ)	7
Scotland Singles (OCC)	32
UK Singles (OCC)	41
US Bubbling Under Hot 100 (Billboard)	4
US Alternative Airplay (Billboard)	10
US Mainstream Rock (Billboard)	11

=== Year-end charts ===
Year-end chart performance for "Bawitdaba"
Chart (1999)	Position
US Mainstream Rock Tracks (Billboard)	26
US Modern Rock Tracks (Billboard)	27

== Release history ==
Release history and formats for "Bawitdaba"
Region	Date	Format(s)	Label(s)	Ref.
United States	February 15, 1999	Modern rock radio	Atlantic; Lava; Top Dog	
United States	June 1, 1999	Contemporary hit radio	Atlantic; Lava; Top Dog	
United Kingdom	April 30, 2001	CD	Atlantic; Lava; Top Dog	
