= Devil Without a Cause =

Studio album by Kid Rock
- Released: August 18, 1998
- Recorded: September 1997 – July 1998
- Studios: White Room (Detroit, Michigan); MixRoom (Los Angeles, California)
- Genres: Rap rock; rap metal; nu metal; hard rock; country
- Length: 71:12
- Labels: Atlantic; Lava; Top Dog
- Producers: Kid Rock; John Travis

Kid Rock chronology
Early Mornin' Stoned Pimp (1996)	Devil Without a Cause (1998)	The History of Rock (2000)

Singles from Devil Without a Cause
- 1. "Welcome 2 the Party (Ode 2 the Old School)" Released: July 30, 1998; 2. "I Am the Bullgod" Released: November 23, 1998; 3. "Bawitdaba" Released: February 15, 1999; 4. "Cowboy" Released: August 17, 1999; 5. "Only God Knows Why" Released: October 9, 1999; 6. "Wasting Time" Released: January 25, 2000

Devil Without a Cause is the fourth studio album by American musician Kid Rock. Released on August 18, 1998, the album saw Kid Rock continuing to develop his sound, and marked the finalization of his stage persona as a 'redneck pimp'. Additionally, the song "Cowboy" is seen as being instrumental in the development of the fusion genre country rap.

Devil Without a Cause was a major commercial success. Spurred by the popularity of the single "Bawitdaba", the album sold over 14 million copies, and was certified diamond. The album also received critical acclaim for its genre-mixing sound.

== Recording ==
In 1997, Jason Flom, head of Lava Records, attended one of Kid Rock's performances, and met with Kid Rock, who later gave him a demo containing the songs "Somebody's Gotta Feel This" and "I Got One for Ya", which led to Kid Rock signing with Atlantic Records. As part of his recording deal, Kid Rock received $150,000 from the label. By this time, Kid Rock had fully developed his pimp redneck stage persona and rap rock musical style and wanted to make a "redneck, shit-kicking rock 'n' roll rap" album.

The album was recorded at the White Room in Detroit and mixed at the Mix Room in Los Angeles. Kid Rock spent two months in the studio with "a hot tub, some girls and some illegal substances". In addition to the newly written songs, the band also re-recorded some of Kid Rock's older songs, including "I Am the Bullgod" from the album The Polyfuze Method, and "Black Chick, White Guy" from the album Early Mornin' Stoned Pimp.

During the recording sessions, Eminem was mixing The Slim Shady LP at the same studio, and, being friends with Kid Rock, asked him to record scratching for the song "My Fault." In return, Eminem delivered a guest rap verse on Kid's song "Fuck Off." In a 1999 interview with Spin Magazine, Eminem told the interviewer that he used cocaine for the first and last time ever while writing and recording his verse with Kid. According to Eminem, Kid was in "full party mode with tons of different drugs just laid out near the studio mixing board. There were Playboy playmates just passed out naked with coke on their nose. It was overwhelming. I never touched that shit again."

== Composition ==
=== Style ===
The A.V. Club wrote that while Devil Without a Cause is "not nü-metal, [it] extended the lineage of rap-rock that Run-DMC and Aerosmith had first established." Nevertheless, the album has been described as a notable nu metal release that helped "create the rap-rock/nu-metal phenomenon". AllMusic said that the album best demonstrated the "organic, integrated sound" of rap rock that differed sharply from that of rap metal, which in contrast sounded "as if the riffs were merely overdubbed over scratching and beat box beats", whereas rap rock, as Devil Without a Cause demonstrated, was defined as "rock song[s] where the vocalist rapped instead of sang". According to Stephen Thomas Erlewine, "The key to [the album's] success is that it's never trying to be a hip-hop record. It's simply a monster rock album." Erlewine credits Kid Rock's backing band, Twisted Brown Trucker, for crafting a sound defined by "thunderous, funky noise -- and that's funky not just in the classic sense, but also in a Southern-fried, white trash sense, as he gives this as much foundation in country as he does hip-hop." Erlewine believes the album's sound owed influence to Bob Seger, Lynyrd Skynyrd and Van Halen." Erlewine also believed the album was "firmly in the tradition of classic hard rock". Billboard wrote, "it’s not a stretch to call Devil Without a Cause, Rock’s breakthrough fourth record, the Appetite for Destruction or The Chronic of rap-rock."

=== Music and lyrics ===
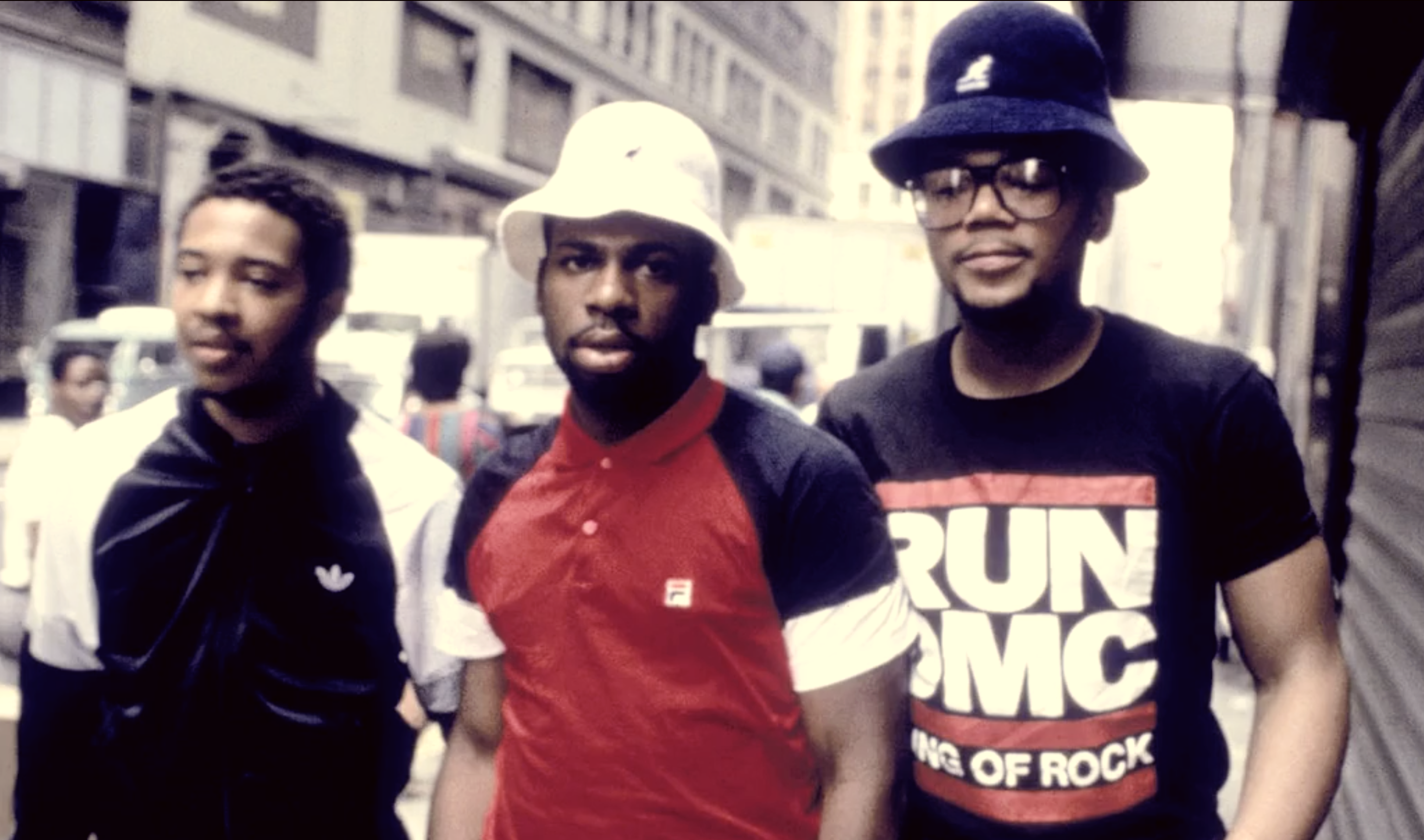
The opening line to "Bawitdaba" paraphrased a line from Run-DMC's song "Hit It Run" from the group's 1986 studio album Raising Hell (group pictured). It is a play on the cadence of the line: "...cause I'm the King of Rock" to "My name is Kid Rock"

"Bawitdaba" has been described as having a nu metal sound. To create the chorus, Kid Rock combined the choruses of Busy Bee's "Making Cash Money", the Marcels' recording of "Blue Moon" and the Sugar Hill Gang's "Rapper's Delight" into a "neo-gregorian drone". The lyrics of the song are dedicated to "chicks with beepers" and the I.R.S., as well as "all the crackheads, the critics, the cynics / And all my heroes in the methadone clinic." In the demo recording of the song, Kid Rock shouts, "Now get in the pit and try to kill someone!" On the album version, Kid Rock changed the lyrics, replacing the word "kill" with "love". Regarding the change, Kid Rock told the Baltimore Sun that he was glad he changed the lyrics, explaining that mosh pits are about coexistence.

The country rap song "Cowboy" was newly written for the album. It is a fusion of hip hop, country music, Southern rock and heavy metal. Billboard, as well as Kid Rock himself, described the song as a cross between Run DMC and Lynyrd Skynyrd. The instrumentation includes Jew's harp, blues harmonica and a piano solo. The lyrics feature Kid Rock rapping about moving to California to become a pimp, and start an escort service "for all the right reasons", located at the top of the Four Seasons hotel, as well as getting thrown out of bars and buying a yacht.

"I Am the Bullgod", according to AXS, was a tribute to the band Monster Magnet. azcentral described the song's style as Southern rock, with elements of funk, while Billboard categorized the song as stoner rock. The lyrics refer to drinking Jim Beam bourbon whiskey; Kid Rock declares that "I am free and I feed on all that is forsaken" and that "I never was cool with James Dean", a reference to the actor who starred in the film that inspired this album's title, Rebel Without a Cause.

The song "Wasting Time" contains an interpolation of Fleetwood Mac's "Second Hand News". "Welcome 2 the Party (Ode 2 the Old School)" refers to Orson Welles' Paul Masson adverts with the lyric "I will serve no rhymes before their time". "Where U At Rock?" references philosopher Ayn Rand.

"Only God Knows Why" is a country ballad, noted for its prominent use of Auto-Tune. The lyrics of "Black Chick, White Guy" deal with Kid Rock's ten-year off-and-on relationship with a classmate named Kelley South Russell, with whom he fathered one child and raised another child from a previous relationship, but broke up with her after finding out that a third child he was raising wasn't his, after which he gained custody of his son, Robert James Ritchie Jr.; these events became the inspiration for this song, which discusses them directly, although Russell denies some of the allegations made against her in the lyrics.

== Reception ==
Professional ratings
Review scores
Source	Rating
AllMusic	4.5/5 stars
Drowned in Sound	8/10
The Encyclopedia of Popular Music	4/5 stars
Pitchfork	1.3/10
Rock Hard	8/10
The Rolling Stone Album Guide	4/5 stars
Tom Hull – on the Web	B+
The Village Voice	A−
Wall of Sound	84/100

=== Critical reviews ===
The album received critical acclaim upon release. Robert Christgau gave the album an A−, writing, "Belatedly fulfilling the rap-metal promise of Licensed to Ill, [Kid Rock] makes the competition sound clownish, limp, and corny, respectively, and the Eminem cameo is a draw [...] [Kid Rock] is, and I quote, all of that and a bag of chips."

The Rolling Stone Album Guide gave the album four out of five stars, its byline hailing it as "a trailer trash triumph of metal guitars, hip-hop beats, and I'm-an-American-band egomania." Stephen Thomas Erlewine gave the album four and a half out of five stars, writing, "[Kid Rock] came up with the great hard rock album of the late '90s -- a fearlessly funny, bone-crunching record that manages to sustain its strength, not just until the end of its long running time, but through repeated plays."

In a negative review, Pitchfork gave the album 1.3 out of 10, writing, "The hook is that Devil Without A Cause combines rap with metal, but this combination's already been done a million times, and in each case, the result was better than this. Do you really need predictable pimping rhymes over wack-ass metal beats with third-tier, grunge-derived choruses among your records? I ask you: is this what you're missing from your life?"

=== Commercial performance ===
Starting in 1998, Kid Rock disembarked on his Devil Without a Cause Tour. In the spring of 1999, Kid Rock joined Limp Bizkit and Staind on the Limptropolis tour. Through extensive promoting, including appearances on HBO, MTV (including a performance alongside Aerosmith and Run-DMC) and performing at Woodstock 1999, Devil Without a Cause sold over 14 million copies, the album's success spurred by Kid Rock's breakthrough hit single "Bawitdaba".

By April 1999, the album was certified gold, and the following month it was certified platinum, a certification the album received 11 times. The album has since been certified diamond. The album had sold 8.9 million copies per Nielsen SoundScan as of 2007.

In 2000, Kid Rock was nominated for a Grammy Award for Best New Artist, despite having been active in the music industry for over 10 years.

== Legacy ==
The album continued to be popular long after its release, and in 2012, Kid Rock said that he wanted to re-record the album in its entirety, partly to celebrate the album's 15th anniversary, and partly because he would own the master recordings.

The album's critical appraisal has continued long after the album's release, with Allmusic labeling Devil Without a Cause a "rap-rock masterpiece". The song "Cowboy" is considered by AXS to be the first in the country rap genre; Cowboys & Indians claims that Kid Rock's song had a major impact on the country music scene and that artists Jason Aldean and Big & Rich, among others, were influenced by the song.

Fifteen years after the album's release, The Village Voice writer Chaz Kangas praised Kid Rock's artistry, writing, "in the Clinton era when your most viable pop stars were pristine teen-pop sensations, raucous nu-metal antagonists or alternative-to-alternative-to-alternative rock weirdos, Rock stood alone." Praising the song "Cowboy", Kangas called it "one track from this era that's timeless without even trying to be."

Loudwire named Devil Without a Cause one of the 10 best hard rock albums of 1998. Classic Rock magazine named Devil Without a Cause one of 10 essential rap metal albums. Blender named Devil Without a Cause one of the 100 greatest American albums. The album was also listed as one of the 1001 Albums You Must Hear Before You Die.

In 2025, Rae Lemeshow-Barooshian of Loudwire included the album in her list of "the top 50 nu-metal albums of all time", ranking it nineteenth.

== Track listing ==
No.	Title	Writer(s)	Length
1.	"Bawitdaba"	Kid Rock; Matthew Shafer; Jason Krause; David Parker; Sylvia Robinson	4:27
2.	"Cowboy"	Rock; Shafer; John Travis; James Trombly	4:17
3.	"Devil Without a Cause" (featuring Joe C.)	Kenny Olson; Rock; Shafer; Too $hort; Larry Smith; Jalil "Whodini" Hutchins	5:32
4.	"I Am the Bullgod"	Rock	4:50
5.	"Roving Gangster (Rollin')"	Rock; Shafer; Mark Morales; Darren Robinson; Andy Nehra; Damon Wimbley	4:24
6.	"Wasting Time"	Rock; Shafer; Lindsey Buckingham	4:02
7.	"Welcome 2 the Party (Ode 2 the Old School)"	Rock; Shafer; Lamont Dozier; Eddie Holland; Brian Holland	5:14
8.	"I Got One for Ya'" (featuring Robert Bradley)	Olson; Rock; Shafer; John Travis; Jerry Williams	3:43
9.	"Somebody's Gotta Feel This"	Rock; Shafer; Olson; Travis	3:09
10.	"Fist of Rage"	Rock; Shafer; Travis	3:23
11.	"Only God Knows Why"	Rock; Shafer; Travis	5:27
12.	"Fuck Off" (featuring Eminem, does not appear on clean version)	Rock; Shafer; Marshall Mathers; Krause	6:13
13.	"Where U at Rock"	Rock	4:24
14.	"Black Chick, White Guy: "I Am the Bullgod (Remix)"	Rock	12:01
Total length:			71:12

Japanese edition bonus tracks
No.	Title	Length
15.	"Welcome 2 the Party/I Am the Bullgod" (Live)	5:22
16.	"Bawitdaba" (Live)	3:26
Total length:		75:00

- The song "Black Chick, White Guy" ends at 7:07 and the remix begins at 7:10; the remix is presented as a hidden track on the compact disc, but is credited on digital services. The remix is omitted from the Japanese version of the album and replaces the original version on the original vinyl pressing. "Black Chick, White Guy" does not appear on the clean version.

== Personnel ==
- Kid Rock – lead vocals, acoustic & electric guitar, bass, banjo, synthesizer

=== Twisted Brown Trucker ===
- Joe C. – co-vocals
- Misty Love – background vocals
- Jason Krause – guitar
- Kenny Olson – guitar
- Uncle Kracker – turntables, background vocals
- Jimmie Bones – keyboard, organ, piano, synth bass
- Stefanie Eulinberg – drums, percussion

=== Sessions musicians ===
- Bobby East – slide and rhythm guitar
- Shirley "P-Funk" Hayden – background vocals

=== Engineers ===
- Al Sutton – engineering
- Derek Matuja – assistant engineer

=== Additional musicians on "I Am the Bullgod" and "Roving Gangster" ===
- Andrew Nerha – guitar
- Mike Nerha – bass
- Bob Ebeling – drums
- DJ Swamp – turntables

=== Additional co-vocalists ===
- Eminem – on "Fuck Off"
- Robert Bradley – on "I Got One for Ya"
- Thornetta Davis – on "Wasting Time"

=== Additional guest ===
- Chris Peters – guitar on "I Am The Bullgod"

== Charts ==
=== Weekly charts ===
Weekly chart performance for Devil Without a Cause
Chart (1998–2000)	Peak position
Australian Albums (ARIA)	55
Austrian Albums (Ö3 Austria)	28
Canadian Albums (Billboard)	11
German Albums (Offizielle Top 100)	82
New Zealand Albums (RMNZ)	14
US Billboard 200	4

=== Year-end charts ===
Year-end chart performance for Devil Without a Cause
Chart (1999)	Position
US Billboard 200	14
Chart (2000)	Position
Canadian Albums (Nielsen SoundScan)	33
US Billboard 200	15
Chart (2002)	Position
Canadian Alternative Albums (Nielsen SoundScan)	177
Canadian Metal Albums (Nielsen SoundScan)	88

=== Decade-end charts ===
Decade-end charts for Devil Without a Cause
Chart (2000–2009)	Position
US Billboard 200	79

== Certifications ==
Certifications and sales for Devil Without a Cause
Region	Certification	Certified units/sales
Canada (Music Canada)	4× Platinum	400,000^{^}
New Zealand (RMNZ)	Gold	7,500^{^}
United Kingdom (BPI)	Silver	60,000^{^}
United States (RIAA)	11× Platinum	11,000,000^{^}
^{^} Shipments figures based on certification alone.

== See also ==
- List of best-selling albums in the United States
