= Cowboy (Kid Rock song) =

1999 single by Kid Rock

Single by Kid Rock

from the album Devil Without a Cause
- Released: August 10, 1999
- Studio: White Room, Temple of the Dog (Detroit, Michigan)
- Genre: Country rap; rap rock; alternative rock
- Length: 4:17
- Label: Atlantic; Lava; Top Dog
- Songwriters: R. J. Ritchie; Matthew Shafer; James Trombly; John Travis
- Producers: John Travis; Kid Rock

Kid Rock singles chronology
"Bawitdaba" (1999)	"Cowboy" (1999)	"Only God Knows Why" (1999)

Music video
- "Cowboy" on YouTube

"Cowboy" is a song by American musician Kid Rock from his fourth studio album, Devil Without a Cause, released as the album's fourth single in August 1999. It was his first single to chart on the US Billboard Hot 100, peaking at number 82, while reaching number five on the Billboard Modern Rock Tracks chart. With its lyrics about pimping and traveling to California, the song is considered to be one of Kid Rock's best works and has been claimed as influencing modern country music, and it has been labeled the first country rap song. In 2018, the staff of Metal Hammer included the video in the site's list of "the 13 best nu metal videos".

== Artistry ==
"Cowboy" is a fusion of hip hop, country, southern rock and heavy metal. Billboard, and Kid Rock himself, described the song as a cross between Run DMC and Lynyrd Skynyrd. AXS called it the first country rap song, but its also been described as rap rock and alternative rock. The instrumentation includes Jew's harp, blues harmonica and a piano solo which quotes the Doors song "L.A. Woman". The lyrics feature Kid Rock rapping about moving to California to become a pimp, and start an escort service "for all the right reasons", located at the top of the Four Seasons Hotel, as well as getting thrown out of bars and buying a yacht.

== Lawsuit ==
In 2002, new wave band Boys Don't Cry filed suit against Kid Rock, claiming that "Cowboy" was derivative of their 1986 novelty song "I Wanna Be a Cowboy". They alleged Kid Rock, while DJing in Detroit, had played the song; the suit claimed that he took the bassline and adapted his chorus from the track.

== Reception ==
"Cowboy" was named one of "The Ten Worst Songs About Cowboys" by the Houston Press, while other critics and journalists have called it one of Kid Rock's best songs, including writers for AXS and Billboard.

The Village Voice writer Chaz Kangas called "Cowboy" a classic song, writing, "in the Clinton era, when your most viable pop stars were pristine teen-pop sensations, raucous nu-metal antagonists or alternative-to-alternative-to-alternative rock weirdos, Rock stood alone. It's been a surprising 15 years since, but 'Cowboy' remains one track from this era that's timeless without even trying to be."

== Legacy ==
"Cowboy" is considered to be the first country rap song, and was influential on the music styles described as "hick-hop" and "bro country". Cowboys & Indians claims that "Cowboy" had a major impact on the country music scene; the magazine alleges that artists Jason Aldean and Big & Rich, among others, were influenced by the song's country rap style.

Kid Rock performed the song at the Super Bowl XXXVIII halftime show. Country singer Kenny Chesney has covered the song in concert in 2009 and 2016, the latter with Kid Rock on Chesney's Spread the Love Tour. In 2017, Kid Rock joined country singer Chris Janson on stage for mashup of Janson's song "Buy Me A Boat" and "Cowboy".

== Credits and personnel ==
Credits are lifted from the Devil Without a Cause liner notes.

Studios

- Recorded at White Room Studios and Temple of the Dog (Detroit, Michigan)
- Mixed at The Mix Room (Burbank, California)
- Mastered at Masterdisk (New York City)

Musicians

- Kid Rock – writing (as R. J. Ritchie), vocals, mixing, production, engineering
- Twisted Brown Trucker – assistant engineering
  - Uncle Kracker – writing (as Matthew Shafer), turntables
  - Jimmie "Bones" Trombly – writing (as James Trombly), keyboards
  - Misty Love – backing vocals
  - Shirley Hayden – backing vocals
  - Kenny Olson – lead guitar
  - Jason Krause – metal guitar
  - Stefanie Eulinberg – drums

Other personnel

- John Travis – writing, production, engineering
- Al Sutton – mixing, engineering
- Derek Matuja – assistant engineering
- Tony Dawsey – mastering

== Charts ==
=== Weekly charts ===
Weekly chart performance for "Cowboy"
Chart (1999)	Peak position
Australia (ARIA)	52
Netherlands (Dutch Top 40 Tipparade)	9
Netherlands (Single Top 100)	97
New Zealand (Recorded Music NZ)	32
Scotland Singles (OCC)	36
UK Singles (OCC)	36
US Billboard Hot 100	82
US Mainstream Rock Tracks (Billboard)	10
US Mainstream Top 40 (Billboard)	34
US Modern Rock Tracks (Billboard)	5

=== Weekly charts ===
Year-end chart performance for "Cowboy"
Chart (1999)	Position
US Mainstream Rock Tracks (Billboard)	61
US Modern Rock Tracks (Billboard)	37

== Release history ==
Release dates and formats for "Cowboy"
Region	Date	Format(s)	Label(s)	Ref.
United States	August 10, 1999	Alternative radio	Atlantic; Lava; Top Dog	
United Kingdom	October 11, 1999	CD; cassette	Atlantic; Lava	
United States	December 7, 1999	Rhythmic contemporary radio	Atlantic; Lava; Top Dog	
