= Only God Knows Why =

1999 single by Kid Rock

Single by Kid Rock

from the album Devil Without a Cause
- Released: November 30, 1999
- Studio: White Room (Detroit, Michigan)
- Genre: Country; blues rock; Southern rock
- Length: 5:27 (album version); 4:17 (radio edit)
- Label: Atlantic; Lava; Top Dog
- Songwriters: RJ Ritchie; Matt Shafer; John Travis
- Producers: Kid Rock; John Travis

Kid Rock singles chronology
"Cowboy" (1999)	"Only God Knows Why" (1999)	"Wasting Time" (2000)

Music video
- "Only God Knows Why" on YouTube

"Only God Knows Why" is a song by American musician Kid Rock. It appears as the 11th track on his fourth studio album, Devil Without a Cause (1998). The song was the first recorded ballad on record by Kid Rock. It is a weary power ballad in which the first four lines were written while Kid Rock was in jail after a bar fight after signing to Atlantic Records in 1997.

The song was released as a single in 1999 and peaked at number 19 on the US Billboard Hot 100, eventually ranking at number 67 on the Billboard year-end chart for 2000. VH1 named it the 19th greatest power ballad in 2002. Outlaw country singer David Allan Coe released a live cover version of his release Live at Billy Bob's in 2003.

== Music video ==
The music video is a montage of stage performances, his off time during touring, wandering the streets of and riding the streetcars in New Orleans and his performance at Woodstock 1999. The most infamous scenes are him getting hit with a full wine bottle in the head onstage, along with an overzealous fan following him to his car with security holding him back. His band, mother, father, and son are featured (during the part where he sings "I watch my youngest son and it helps to pass the time"). There are cameos by other stars like Mark McGrath of Sugar Ray, Gibby Haynes of Butthole Surfers and Hank Williams Jr. whose appearance comes after Kid Rock appeared in his "Naked Women and Beer" video.

There is a censored version, with the buttocks of a stripper blurred out while Kid Rock is signing it and when he makes a gun gesture which is blurred out.

== Track listing ==
CD single

1. "Only God Knows Why" (radio edit)
2. "Only God Knows Why" (German radio edit)
3. "Wasting Time" (live)

== Personnel ==
- Kid Rock – vocals, acoustic guitar
- Kenny Olson – lead guitar
- Bobby East – slide guitar
- Jimmie Bones – piano, organ
- Stephanie Eulinberg – drums, percussion

== Charts ==
=== Weekly charts ===
Chart (2000)	Peak position
Canada Top Singles (RPM)	13
Canada Rock/Alternative (RPM)	3
Germany (GfK)	96
Iceland (Íslenski Listinn Topp 40)	14
Quebec Airplay (ADISQ)	3
US Billboard Hot 100	19
US Adult Pop Airplay (Billboard)	23
US Alternative Airplay (Billboard)	13
US Mainstream Rock (Billboard)	5
US Pop Airplay (Billboard)	6

=== Year-end charts ===
Chart (2000)	Position
US Billboard Hot 100	67
US Adult Top 40 (Billboard)	51
US Mainstream Rock Tracks (Billboard)	20
US Mainstream Top 40 (Billboard)	28
US Modern Rock Tracks (Billboard)	43

== Release history ==
Region	Date	Format(s)	Label(s)	Ref.
United States	November 30, 1999	Mainstream rock; active rock; alternative radio	Atlantic; Lava; Top Dog	
United States	January 25, 2000	Contemporary hit radio	Atlantic; Lava; Top Dog	
