= Live Trucker =

Live album by Kid Rock & the Twisted Brown Trucker Band
- Released: February 28, 2006
- Recorded: September 1, 2000 – August 28, 2004
- Venues: DTE Energy Music Theatre (Clarkston, MI); Pine Knob Music Theatre (Clarkston, MI); Cobo Hall (Detroit, MI); St. Louis
- Genres: Rock; hip-hop; country; heavy metal
- Length: 1:13:29
- Labels: Top Dog; Atlantic
- Producer: Kid Rock

Kid Rock chronology
Kid Rock (2003)	Live Trucker (2006)	Rock n Roll Jesus (2007)

Professional ratings
Review scores
Source	Rating
AllMusic	2/5 stars
IGN	7.2/10
PopMatters	6/10
Rolling Stone	3/5 stars
Tom Hull	B

Live Trucker is a live album by American musician Kid Rock and backing band Twisted Brown Trucker. It was released on February 28, 2006 by Top Dog and Atlantic Records. Most of the album was recorded in August 2004 at the DTE Energy Music Theatre in Clarkston, Michigan.

== Background ==
Unlike the rest of the album, "Devil Without a Cause" and "Early Mornin' Stoned Pimp", which featured Joe C. and Uncle Kracker, were recorded on September 1, 2000 at Pine Knob Music Theatre, while "Cowboy Intro", "Cowboy" and Gretchen Wilson-assisted "Picture", were recorded at Cobo Arena in Detroit on March 27, 2004, and "Outstanding" was recorded at Soundcheck in St. Louis.

The cover of the album is in the same style as the Bob Seger & the Silver Bullet Band album Live Bullet.

== Artistry ==
The medley of "Somebody's Gotta Feel This" and "Fist of Rage," bridged together by Led Zeppelin's "Whole Lotta Love". "Cowboy" has the Dukes of Hazzard's theme song "Good Ol' Boys" removed from it. Likewise, an excerpt from AC/DC's "Back in Black" was removed from the first chorus of "Devil Without a Cause". "You Never Met a Motherfucker Quite Like Me" includes a verse of Lynyrd Skynyrd's "Free Bird" in the middle of the song.

== Track listing ==
No.	Title	Writer(s)	Length
1.	"Son of Detroit"	Robert James Ritchie; David Allan Coe; Harold Eugene Tipton; Ronnie Brooks; Tom DeLuca	5:11
2.	"Bawitdaba"	Ritchie; Matthew Shafer; Jason Krause	5:44
3.	"Cowboy Intro"		2:56
4.	"Cowboy"	Ritchie; Shafer; John Travis; James Trombly	5:02
5.	"Devil Without a Cause"	Ritchie; Shafer; Kenny Olson; Jalil Hutchins; Lawrence Smith; Todd Shaw	6:11
6.	"Somebody's Gotta Feel This / Fist of Rage"	Ritchie; Shafer; Olson; Travis; Damon Wimbley; Darren Robinson; Mark Morales	5:41
7.	"Picture" (featuring Gretchen Wilson)	Ritchie	6:09
8.	"American Bad Ass"	Ritchie; James Hetfield; Lars Ulrich	4:10
9.	"Rock N Roll Pain Train"	Ritchie	4:05
10.	"Early Mornin' Stoned Pimp"	Ritchie; Martin "Tino" Gross	7:11
11.	"You Never Met a Motherfucker Quite Like Me"	Ritchie; Ronnie Van Zant; Allen Collins	5:48
12.	"Cocky"	Ritchie; Shafer; Freddie Beauregard	3:04
13.	"Only God Knows Why"	Ritchie; Shafer; Travis	6:33
14.	"Outstanding"	Raymond Calhoun; Charlie Wilson; Lonnie Simmons	5:33
Total length:			1:13:29

== Personnel ==
- Robert "Kid Rock" Ritchie – vocals, guitars, keyboards, drums, turntables, producer, mixing
- Jason Krause – guitars
- Kenny Olson – guitars
- James "Jimmie Bones" Trombly – keyboards, harmonica, background vocals
- Aaron Julison – bass, background vocals
- Stefanie Eulinberg – drums, background vocals
- Freddie "Paradime" Beauregard – turntables, background vocals
- Karen Newman – backup vocals
- Laura Creamer – backup vocals
- Renwick Smith Curry – pedal steel, dobro
- Joseph "Joe C." Calleja – vocals (tracks: 5, 10)
- Matthew "Uncle Kracker" Shafer – vocals and turntables (tracks: 5, 10)
- Michael Bradford – bass (tracks: 5, 10)
- Gretchen Wilson – vocals (track 7)
- David Hewitt – engineering
- Gerard Smerek – engineering (tracks: 5, 10)
- Kenneth Van Druten – engineering (tracks: 3, 4, 7)
- Al Sutton – mixing
- Michael "Blumpy" Tuller – pre-mixing
- Mike E. Clark – additional pre-mixing
- Ted Jensen – mastering

== Charts ==
Chart (2006)	Peak position
US Billboard 200	12
US Top Rock Albums (Billboard)	4
US Top Catalog Albums (Billboard)	27
US Indie Store Album Sales (Billboard)	7
