= Born Free (disambiguation) =

Born Free is a 1966 film directed by James Hill. It may also refer to:

Born Free may also refer to:

== Music ==
- "Born Free" (Matt Monro song), a 1966 composition by John Barry and Don Black for the film
  - Born Free (Andy Williams album), featuring the above song
  - Born Free (Milt Jackson album), featuring the above song
- "Born Free" (M.I.A. song), a 2010 song by M.I.A.
  - Born Free (music video), the music video/short film
- Born Free (Kid Rock album), a 2010 album by Kid Rock
  - "Born Free" (Kid Rock song), featured in the above album
- Born Free (Humble Gods album), 2004

== Television ==
- Born Free (TV series), a 1974 television series based on the film
- Dinosaur Expedition Born Free, a 1976 anime series by Sunrise
- "Born Free" (Dexter), a 2006 episode of the television series Dexter

== Other uses ==
- Born Free (book), a 1960 nonfiction book by Joy Adamson upon which the film was based
- Born Free Foundation, a UK-based charitable organisation named after the film
