= History of Rock Tour =

2000 concert tour by Kid Rock

- Tour by Kid Rock
- Location: North America
- Associated album: The History of Rock

Kid Rock concert chronology
- Devil Without a Cause Tour (1998–99); History of Rock Tour (2000); The American Badass Tour (2001)

The History of Rock Tour was a concert tour by American rapper and singer Kid Rock in support of his compilation album The History of Rock. This was also the last tour to include Joe C. before his death in November 2000.

== Setlist ==
1. Where U at Rock
2. Welcome 2 the Party (Ode 2 the Old School)
3. Jumpin' Jack Flash (Rolling Stones cover)
4. Devil Without a Cause
5. Fuck Off
6. 3 Sheets to the Wind (What's My Name)
7. Wasting Time
8. Heaven (Uncle Kracker cover)
9. What ’Chu Lookin’ At? (Uncle Kracker cover)
10. Early Mornin' Stoned Pimp
11. Rocky Mountain Way (Joe Walsh cover)
12. Born 2 B a Hick
13. Prodigal Son
14. Only God Knows Why
15. Cowboy
16. Somebody's Gotta Feel This
17. Fist of Rage
18. American Bad Ass
19. Bawitdaba

== Personnel ==
Kid Rock – lead vocals

Joe C. – co-vocals

Jason Krause – guitar

Kenny Olson – guitar

Michael Bradford – Bass

Uncle Kracker – turntables, background vocals

Jimmie Bones – keyboard, organ, piano, synth bass

Stefanie Eulinberg – drums, percussion

== Tour Dates ==
Date	City	Country	Venue	Opening Acts
August 3, 2000	Bonner Springs	United States	Sandstone Amphitheater	David Allan Coe, Dope, Uncle Kracker
August 5, 2000	Minneapolis	United States	Target Center	David Allan Coe, Dope, Uncle Kracker
August 7, 2000	Cleveland	United States	Blossom Music Center	David Allan Coe, Dope, Uncle Kracker
August 8, 2000	Burgettstown	United States	Post-Gazette Pavilion	David Allan Coe, Dope, Uncle Kracker
August 10, 2000	Hartford	United States	Meadows Music Theatre	David Allan Coe, Dope, Uncle Kracker
August 11, 2000	Holmdel	United States	PNC Bank Arts Center	David Allan Coe, Dope, Uncle Kracker
August 12, 2000	Darien Center	United States	Darien Lake Performing Arts Center	David Allan Coe, Dope, Uncle Kracker
August 14, 2000	Evansville	United States	Roberts Stadium	David Allan Coe, Dope, Uncle Kracker
August 15, 2000	Scranton	United States	Coors Light Amphitheatre	David Allan Coe, Dope, Uncle Kracker
August 16, 2000	Camden	United States	Blockbuster-Sony Music Entertainment Centre	David Allan Coe, Dope, Uncle Kracker
August 17, 2000	Toronto	Canada	The Docks	
August 19, 2000	Nashville	United States	AmSouth Amphitheater	David Allan Coe, Dope, Uncle Kracker
August 20, 2000	Pelham	United States	Oak Mountain Amphitheatre	David Allan Coe, Dope, Uncle Kracker
August 21, 2000	Virginia Beach	United States	GTE Virginia Beach Amphitheater	David Allan Coe, Dope, Uncle Kracker
August 22, 2000	Cincinnati	United States	Riverbend Music Center	David Allan Coe, Dope, Uncle Kracker
August 23, 2000	Grand Rapids	United States	Van Andel Arena	David Allan Coe, Dope, Uncle Kracker
August 24, 2000	Columbus	United States	Polaris Amphitheater	David Allan Coe, Dope, Uncle Kracker
August 26, 2000	Noblesville	United States	Deer Creek Music Center	David Allan Coe, Dope, Uncle Kracker
August 31, 2000	Clarkston	United States	Pine Knob Music Theatre	David Allan Coe, Dope, Uncle Kracker
September 1, 2000	Clarkston	United States	Pine Knob Music Theatre	David Allan Coe, Dope, Uncle Kracker
