= Lonely Road of Faith =

Single by Kid Rock

from the album Cocky
- Released: January 4, 2002
- Recorded: 1999
- Studio: Clarkston Chophouse, Clarkston, Michigan
- Genre: Southern rock
- Length: 5:28
- Label: Atlantic, Lava
- Songwriter(s): RJ Ritchie
- Producer(s): Kid Rock

Kid Rock singles chronology
"Forever" (2001)	"Lonely Road of Faith" (2002)	"You Never Met a Motherfucker Quite Like Me" (2002)

"Lonely Road of Faith" was the second released single from Kid Rock's 2001 album Cocky. Written in 1995, the song was released on the 2001 album Cocky. It received some minor attention on CMT, as the live version from CMT's Crossroads peaked at #2 on CMT Most Wanted Live and #17 on the CMT Top 20 Countdown. The MTV and VH1 Music Video was taken from Kid Rock's 2002 performance at the MTV USO special for troops stationed at Germany's Ramstein Air Base. The song was featured in two different WWE (then WWF) video packages when WCW's New World Order was sent by Vince McMahon to poison the WWF. The first video was a tribute to the history of the company. The second one mirrored the first video until the rap-rock bridge and the video became scenes of New World Order's destruction. The song peaked at #15 on the Mainstream Rock Charts. An alternative version of the song appeared on Rock's 2010 EP Racing Father Time. It removed the rap rock bridge and had a latin-influence to it with a Spanish-style guitar added.

== Track listing ==
1. "Lonely Road of Faith" (Alt Version)
2. "Lonely Road of Faith" (No Bridge Edit)
3. "Lonely Road of Faith" (Radio Edit)

== Charts ==
Chart (2002)	Peak position
U.S. Billboard Mainstream Rock Tracks	15
