= Forever (Kid Rock song) =

2001 single by Kid Rock

Single by Kid Rock

from the album Cocky
- Released: October 23, 2001
- Studio: The Clarkston Chophouse (Clarkston, Michigan)
- Genre: Nu metal; rap metal
- Length: 3:46
- Label: Atlantic; Lava; Top Dog
- Songwriters: R. J. Ritchie; Matthew Shafer; Freddie Beauregard
- Producer: Kid Rock

Kid Rock singles chronology
"American Bad Ass" (2000)	"Forever" (2001)	"Lonely Road of Faith" (2002)

Music video
- "Forever" on YouTube

"Forever" is the first single released from American singer-songwriter Kid Rock's fifth studio album, Cocky (2001), on October 23, 2001. The song peaked at number 18 on the US Billboard Mainstream Rock chart and number 21 on the Billboard Modern Rock Tracks chart. Internationally, it reached number 27 in Australia, number 52 in Germany, and number 75 in Switzerland.

"I'm a Dog", Cocky's 10th track, was released along with "Forever" on the single. The music video, released in October 2001, features Pamela Anderson. When the song is performed during concerts, the vocals are played over an instrumental version of "Tom Sawyer" by Rush.

== Track listings ==
European CD single

1. "Forever" (radio edit)
2. "Forever" (album version)

Australian CD single

1. "Forever" (radio edit) – 3:45
2. "Forever" (explicit album version) – 3:45
3. "I'm a Dog" (explicit album version) – 3:35

== Credits and personnel ==
Credits are lifted from the European CD single liner notes.

Studios

- Recorded at The Clarkston Chophouse (Clarkston, Michigan)
- Mixed at The Mix Room (Burbank, California)
- Mastered at Sterling Sound (New York City)

Personnel

- Kid Rock – writing (as R. J. Ritchie), lead vocals, backing vocals, production, mixing
- Uncle Kracker – writing (as Matthew Shafer), backing vocals
- Paradime – writing (as Freddie Beauregard), backing vocals
- Kenny Olson – lead guitar
- Jason Krause – metal guitar
- Jimmie Bones – organ
- Stefanie Eulinberg – drums
- Al Sutton – engineering, mixing
- Ted Jensen – mastering
- Larry Freemantle – art direction and design
- Clay McBride – photography

== Charts ==
Chart (2001–2002)	Peak position
Australia (ARIA)	27
Germany (GfK)	52
Switzerland (Schweizer Hitparade)	75
US Alternative Airplay (Billboard)	21
US Mainstream Rock (Billboard)	18

== Release history ==
Region	Date	Format(s)	Label(s)	Ref.
United States	October 23, 2001	Mainstream rock; active rock; alternative radio	Atlantic; Lava	
Australia	January 14, 2002	CD	Atlantic; Lava	
