= Sad but True =

1993 single by Metallica

"Sad But True"

Single by Metallica

from the album Metallica
- B-side: "So What?"
- Released: February 8, 1993
- Recorded: 1990–91
- Studio: One on One (Los Angeles)
- Genre: Heavy metal; groove metal
- Length: 5:24
- Label: Elektra; Vertigo (UK)
- Composers: James Hetfield; Lars Ulrich
- Lyricist: James Hetfield
- Producers: Bob Rock; James Hetfield; Lars Ulrich

Metallica singles chronology
"Wherever I May Roam" (1992)	"Sad But True" (1993)	"Until It Sleeps" (1996)

Music video
- "Sad but True" on YouTube

Audio sample
- "Sad But True": file; help

"Sad But True" is a song by American heavy metal band Metallica. It was released in February 1993 by Elektra Records, as the fifth and final single from their fifth and self-titled album (1991). The song peaked at number 15 on the US Billboard Mainstream Rock chart. It also reached numbers 82 and 98 on the US Cash Box Top 100 and Billboard Hot 100 charts. The accompanying music video was released in October 1992.

== Music ==
According to Lars Ulrich, the initial idea for "Sad But True" dates as far back as 1986 during the Master of Puppets era. The song is in D Standard tuning, however the song was originally written and demoed in E Standard. Bob Rock, who produced Metallica, recalled to Musicradar.com: "We were in pre-production, which was uncomfortable because nobody had ever made them go through their songs in such a deliberate way before, and six songs in 'Sad But True' came along. Suddenly, I realized that every song, including this one, was in the key of E. I brought this to the band's attention, and they said, 'Well, isn't E the lowest note?' So I told them that on Mötley Crüe's Dr. Feelgood, which I produced and Metallica loved, the band had tuned down to D. Metallica then tuned down to D, and that's when the riff really became huge. It was this force that you just couldn't stop, no matter what."

Rock, Hetfield, and Ulrich are all credited as producers, and Randy Staub and his assistant, Mike Tacci.

== Music video ==
The music video filmed in January 1992 in San Diego and directed by Wayne Isham. It premiered on October 5, 1992.

== Track listing ==
US single

1. "Sad But True"
2. "So What?"

International single part 1

1. "Sad But True" – 5:27
2. "So What?" – 3:09
3. "Harvester of Sorrow" (live) – 6:41

International single part 2

1. "Sad But True" – 5:27
2. "Nothing Else Matters (Elevator Version)" – 6:31
3. "Creeping Death" (live) – 8:01
4. "Sad But True" (demo) – 4:53

UK picture single

1. "Sad But True" – 5:26
2. "Nothing Else Matters" (live) – 6:13
3. "Sad But True" (live) – 6:12

UK and German 7-inch single

1. "Sad But True" – 5:24
2. "Nothing Else Matters" – 6:29

French single

1. "Sad But True" – 5:27
2. "Nothing Else Matters (Edit)" – 6:29

International 7-inch single

1. "Sad But True"
2. "Nothing Else Matters" (live)
3. "Sad But True" (live)

== Personnel ==
Personnel adapted from Metallica liner notes, except where noted.

Metallica

- James Hetfield – rhythm guitar, baritone guitar, vocals
- Kirk Hammett – lead guitar
- Jason Newsted – bass
- Lars Ulrich – drums

Additional Performer

- John Marshall – guitar on "Nothing Else Matters" (live)

== Cover versions ==
In 2020, the Mongolian hunnu band The HU released a cover of the song translated entirely into Mongolian.

The Metallica Blacklist, a compilation album released in 2021, features seven covers of the song, including a live version by Sam Fender and studio versions by Jason Isbell and the 400 Unit, Mexican Institute of Sound, Royal Blood, St. Vincent, White Reaper and YB.

The soundtrack of EA Sports College Football 27 features a cover of this song recorded by the Carolina Band of the University of South Carolina, who won Metallica's "For Whom the Band Tolls" college marching band contest in 2025.

== Samples ==
Kid Rock sampled the track for his song "American Bad Ass" from his 2000 album The History of Rock.

== Charts ==
Chart (1992–1993)	Peak position
Australia (ARIA)	48
Belgium (Ultratop 50 Flanders)	50
Canada Retail Singles (The Record)	34
Denmark (IFPI)	3
Europe (Eurochart Hot 100)	22
Finland (Suomen virallinen lista)	1
Germany (GfK)	42
Ireland (IRMA)	13
Netherlands (Dutch Top 40)	17
Netherlands (Single Top 100)	10
New Zealand (Recorded Music NZ)	42
Norway (VG-lista)	5
Portugal (AFP)	2
Sweden (Sverigetopplistan)	31
UK Singles (Official Charts)	20
US Billboard Hot 100	98
US Mainstream Rock Airplay (Billboard)	15
US Cash Box Top 100	82

Chart (2026)	Peak position
Greece International (IFPI)	29

== Certifications ==
Region	Certification	Certified units/sales
Australia (ARIA)	2× Platinum	140,000^{‡}
New Zealand (RMNZ)	Platinum	30,000^{‡}
United States (RIAA)	2× Platinum	2,000,000^{‡}
Streaming
Greece (IFPI Greece)	Gold	1,000,000^{†}
^{‡} Sales+streaming figures based on certification alone.^{†} Streaming-only figures based on certification alone.
