= Cocky (album) =

Studio album by Kid Rock
- Released: November 20, 2001
- Recorded: 1999–2001
- Studios: Clarkston Chophouse, Clarkston, Michigan
- Genres: Rap rock; hard rock; country; southern rock; rap metal; nu metal
- Length: 63:36
- Labels: Lava; Atlantic; Top Dog
- Producer: Kid Rock

Kid Rock chronology
The History of Rock (2000)	Cocky (2001)	Kid Rock (2003)

Singles from Cocky
- 1. "Forever" Released: October 23, 2001; 2. "Lonely Road of Faith" Released: January 4, 2002; 3. "You Never Met a Motherfucker Quite Like Me" Released: March 7, 2002; 4. "Picture" Released: November 12, 2002

Cocky is the fifth studio album by American musician Kid Rock. Released in 2001, it is his third release for Atlantic Records. In May 2011, the album was certified 5× platinum by the RIAA and has sold 5,344,000 copies in the US as of December 2013. According to Kid Rock's official website that made a timeline for his 45th birthday in January 2016, Cocky was certified 6× platinum on August 26, 2008. However, RIAA only certified the album at 5× platinum.

== Background ==
The album was dedicated to Rock's former assistant and hype man Joe C., who died in November of the previous year from celiac disease complications. A total of 75 songs were written for the album, but only 30 of them were recorded. One recorded song that did not make the album was "If I Was President", a standard blues song Kid Rock plays frequently in concert. Another song left off the album was the Joe C. eulogy "In Your Lifetime". Some of the songs that were recorded during this album's sessions appeared on Kid Rock's self-titled album.

== Artistry ==
Cocky saw a shift in Kid Rock's sound, featuring more ballads, most notably "Picture", recorded as a duet with Sheryl Crow. The album has less rapping than his preceding releases, and more classic rock influences. "Trucker Anthem" contains a sample from The Wizard of Oz. Brunner described "Midnight Train to Memphis" as MOR country, and "Lonely Road of Faith" as a power ballad. "You Never Met a Motherfucker Quite Like Me" makes lyrical references to Hank Williams Jr., ZZ Top's Billy Gibbons, Run-DMC's Joseph Simmons, and Willie Nelson. The title track, "Cocky," was used for WWF Royal Rumble.

Entertainment Weekly writer Rob Brunner described Cocky as a concept album, stating, "Boastful and defensive, confrontational and thin-skinned, loud, rude, and proud of it, Kid Rock is a composite of blatantly unpleasant stereotypes sure to scare the neighbors: strutting ghetto pimp, Skynyrd-loving redneck, heavy metal burnout."

== Release and promotion ==
The album's first single is the rap rock track "Forever", charting at number 18 on Mainstream Rock and number 21 on Modern Rock. He performed the song on TRL and The Late Show with David Letterman, leading to a number eight debut (it climbed to number 3 after the release of "Picture"), and with Hank Williams Jr at CMT Crossroads in late 2001. The second single is the ballad "Lonely Road of Faith", released in January 2002. The song was heavily promoted by WWE in the video tribute to the History of WWE, and featured on WB's Smallville and MTV's Real World. The song peaked at number 15 on the Mainstream Rock Tracks. In July 2002, a censored version of "You Never Met a Motherfucker Quite Like Me" was released to radio, peaking at number 32 on the Mainstream Rock Tracks.

Kid Rock tested out "Picture" at CMT's Farm Aid with Allison Moorer filling in for Sheryl Crow, whose label butted heads with Rock. He released that version as a single in November 2002, and it began climbing the country charts. Crow's label changed its minds, and her version was released in January 2003, becoming Kid Rock's first crossover hit, charting at number four on the Hot 100, number 5 on the Top 40, number two on Adult Contemporary and number 17 on country radio. The single was certified gold and spent 52 weeks on top the Country Singles Sales chart, also peaking at number one on the US Singles Sales charts and number two on the Canadian Singles Sales chart. The song became Sheryl Crow's second most successful single after "All I Wanna Do", and was nominated for CMA Vocal Event of The Year.

== Reception ==
Professional ratings
Aggregate scores
Source	Rating
Metacritic	57/100
Review scores
Source	Rating
AllMusic	4/5 stars
E! Online	B
Entertainment Weekly	B
The Guardian	2/5 stars
Mojo	4/5 stars
NME	5/10
Q	3/5 stars
Rolling Stone	3/5 stars
The Rolling Stone Album Guide	2.5/5 stars
Uncut	5/10

According to the review aggregator Metacritic, Cocky received "mixed or average reviews" based on a weighted average score of 57 out of 100 from 10 critic scores.

Stephen Thomas Erlewine, writing for AllMusic, gave the album four out of five stars, writing, "unpretentious, blue-collar hard rock hasn't sounded this good in nearly 20 years, and that's reason enough to celebrate."

Entertainment Weekly writer Rob Brunner gave the album a B, writing, "Kid Rock's tear-down-the-walls ideal of a world where rappers can sip whiskey with rednecks is a compelling fiction, and if the cross-pollinated musical results aren't always as exciting as the conversation no doubt would be, you have to at least admire the breadth of his vision." Brunner felt that "Too much of Cocky meanders into boring stylistic experiments", calling "Picture" a "sappy duet".

Rolling Stone writer Barry Walters gave Cocky three out of five stars, writing, "Rock self-consciously builds on his badass-hick-with-a-heart-of-gold image [...] [The execution] is really corn, [...] Rock's AC/DC, Run-D.M.C. and Lynyrd Skynyrd. tributes now come across as clunky imitation."

== Track listing ==
No.	Title	Writer(s)	Length
1.	"Trucker Anthem"	M. O'Brien, D. Reeves, Robert James Ritchie, Matthew Shafer, H. Stothart, D. McDaniels, R. Simmons, J. Simmons	4:39
2.	"Forever"	Freddie Beauregard, Robert James Ritchie, Matthew Shafer	3:46
3.	"Lay It on Me"	Robert James Ritchie, Matthew Shafer	4:56
4.	"Cocky"	Freddie Beauregard, Robert James Ritchie, Matthew Shafer	3:57
5.	"What I Learned Out on the Road"	Robert James Ritchie, Matthew Shafer	4:58
6.	"I'm Wrong, But You Ain't Right"	Robert James Ritchie	4:56
7.	"Lonely Road of Faith"	Robert James Ritchie	5:28
8.	"You Never Met a Motherfucker Quite Like Me"	Robert James Ritchie, Ronnie Van Zant, Allen Collins	4:53
9.	"Picture" (featuring Sheryl Crow)	Robert James Ritchie, Sheryl Crow	4:58
10.	"I'm a Dog"	Robert James Ritchie, K. Olson	3:36
11.	"Midnight Train to Memphis"	Robert James Ritchie, Matthew Shafer	4:44
12.	"Baby Come Home"	Robert James Ritchie	3:08
13.	"Drunk in the Morning"	Robert James Ritchie	5:31
14.	"WCSR" (featuring Snoop Dogg)	Robert James Ritchie, Calvin Cordozar Broadus Jr.	4:44
Total length:			63:36

A clean version is also available, removing most vulgarity, as well as the song "WCSR". The clean version also features a picture of Kid Rock's face on the disc, while the unedited version has an image of Rock's hands with raised middle fingers (a reference to Rock's previous album Devil Without a Cause which featured just Rock's right hand making the same gesture); both feature Kid Rock's name. The edited version of Cocky also renames track eight to "You Never Met a White Boy Quite Like Me".

== Credits ==
- Kid Rock – vocals; lead guitar, rhythm guitar, acoustic guitar, slide guitar, Dobro, banjo, steel guitar, synthesizer, turntables, harmonica, organ, piano, bass, drum machine

=== Twisted Brown Trucker ===
- Misty Love – vocals
- Shirley Hayden – vocals
- Kenny Olson – bass, lead guitar, rhythm guitar
- Jason Krause – lead guitar, rhythm guitar
- Uncle Kracker – vocals, turntables
- Jimmie Bones – piano, organ, harmonica, keyboards, vocals
- Stefanie Eulinberg – drums, percussion, vocals

=== Guests ===
- Snoop Dogg – vocals on "WCSR"
- Sheryl Crow – bass, vocals, twelve-string guitar
- Matt O'Brien – bass on "Trucker Anthem"
- Paradime – vocals on "Forever"
- David Spade – smart-ass on "Midnight Train to Memphis"
- Jeff Grand – Free Bird solo

== Charts ==
=== Weekly charts ===
Weekly chart performance for Cocky
Chart (2001–2003)	Peak position
Australian Albums (ARIA)	21
Austrian Albums (Ö3 Austria)	10
Canadian Albums (Billboard)	15
German Albums (Offizielle Top 100)	15
New Zealand Albums (RMNZ)	7
Swiss Albums (Schweizer Hitparade)	30
US Billboard 200	3

=== Year-end charts ===
Year-end chart performance for Cocky
Chart (2001)	Peak position
Canadian Albums (Nielsen SoundScan)	122
Worldwide Albums (IFPI)	45
Chart (2002)	Position
Austrian Albums (Ö3 Austria)	63
Canadian Albums (Nielsen SoundScan)	186
Canadian Alternative Albums (Nielsen SoundScan)	59
Canadian Metal Albums (Nielsen SoundScan)	29
US Billboard 200	27
Chart (2003)	Position
US Billboard 200	16

=== Decade-end charts ===
Decade-end chart performance for Cocky
Chart (2000–2009)	Position
US Billboard 200	65

== Certifications ==
Certifications and sales for Cocky
Region	Certification	Certified units/sales
Canada (Music Canada)	2× Platinum	200,000^{^}
United States (RIAA)	5× Platinum	5,000,000^{^}
^{^} Shipments figures based on certification alone.
