= You Never Met a Motherfucker Quite Like Me =

Single by Kid Rock

from the album Cocky
- Released: March 7, 2002
- Studio: Clarkston Chophouse, Clarkston, Michigan
- Genre: Hard rock
- Length: 4:53
- Label: Atlantic
- Songwriters: Robert James Ritchie, Allen Collins, Ronnie Van Zant
- Producer: Kid Rock

Kid Rock singles chronology
"Lonely Road of Faith" (2001)	"You Never Met a Motherfucker Quite Like Me" (2002)	"Picture" (2002)

Music video
- "You Never Met a Motherfucker Quite Like Me" on YouTube

"You Never Met a Motherfucker Quite Like Me" (heard on the radio as "...Mother, Mother Quite Like Me", renamed "You Never Met a White Boy Quite Like Me" for the clean album version) was the third single off Kid Rock's fifth studio album Cocky. The song peaked at #32 on the mainstream rock charts in 2002. The middle of the song pays homage to Lynyrd Skynyrd's classic "Free Bird". The 'Live' Trucker version contains the 1st verse of the song before he returns to finish "You Never Met..."

Although the song was the lowest charting song off the album, Kid Rock claims that the "You Never Met a Motherfucker Quite Like Me" T-shirt is the most popular T-shirt at his concerts.

The music video features Hank Williams Jr. and Pamela Anderson. The video takes a shot at the group Radiohead as he wipes himself with toilet paper that says Radiohead on it.

The song was featured in the video game WWE 2K18 under the title "You Never Met A White Boy Quite Like Me", it was one of 11 tracks selected by The Rock (also known as actor Dwayne Johnson) for the game.

== Track listing ==
1. "You Never Met a Motherfucker Quite Like Me" (Radio Edit)
2. "You Never Met a Motherfucker Quite Like Me" (Radio Bleep Edit)
3. "You Never Met a Motherfucker Quite Like Me" (Album Version)

== Charts ==
Chart (2002)	Peak position
U.S. Billboard Mainstream Rock Tracks	32
