= Born Free (Kid Rock album) =

Studio album by Kid Rock
- Released: November 16, 2010
- Recorded: January–July 2010
- Studios: Sound City (Van Nuys, California); Shangri-La (Malibu, California); Allen Roadhouse (Clarkston, Michigan)
- Genres: Country rock; heartland rock
- Length: 56:10
- Labels: Atlantic; Top Dog
- Producer: Rick Rubin

Kid Rock chronology
Rock n Roll Jesus (2007)	Born Free (2010)	Rebel Soul (2012)

Born Free is the eighth studio album by American musician Kid Rock. It was released on November 16, 2010 with the title track as its lead single.

The country-oriented album was produced by Rick Rubin featuring several high-profile artists such as T.I., Sheryl Crow, and Bob Seger. This is Kid Rock's first, and to date, only album not to feature a Parental Advisory sticker; it is also his first all-country album. It is also the first album since 1993's The Polyfuze Method not to feature his backing band Twisted Brown Trucker. Marlon Young is the only member from Twisted Brown Trucker to perform on the album. Kid Rock describes it as "very organic blues-based rock and roll". Cable network TBS used the title track, "Born Free", for its coverage of the 2010 Major League Baseball post-season. As of June 16, 2011 Born Free is certified Platinum by the RIAA for shipments in excess of one million copies. This gave Kid Rock his sixth Platinum album certification in the US. A Michigan only promotion was released with the album: a four-song EP called Racing Father Time.

== Release and promotion ==
The album's lead single was the title track. The songs promotional push included being the theme for the MLB Playoffs, European Music Awards and the CMA Festival. He also performed "Times Like These" at the American Music Awards and "Care" at the Rally for Sanity. This led to a debut of 189,000 copies sold and landing at number five on the Billboard 200. VH-1 aired the Isle of Malta concert special. The following single "God Bless Saturday" became the secondary theme song for ESPN's College Game Day. The third single "Collide" saw him reunite with Sheryl Crow with whom he previously recorded his 2002 single "Picture" and went on a joint tour with. "Purple Sky" failed to chart and the final single was "Care" with rapper T.I. and depending on the version, Martina McBride, Mary J. Blige or Angaleena Presley of the Pistol Annies.

== Critical reception ==
Professional ratings
Aggregate scores
Source	Rating
Metacritic	63/100
Review scores
Source	Rating
AllMusic	4.5/5 stars
The A.V. Club	C
Classic Rock	3/5 stars
Entertainment Weekly	B
Kerrang!	3/5 stars
Los Angeles Times	3/4 stars
Rolling Stone	3.5/5 stars
Slant Magazine	1.5/5 stars
Spin	5/10
Uncut	4/10

According to the review aggregator Metacritic, Born Free received "generally favorable reviews" based on a weighted average score of 63 out of 100 from 10 critic scores.

AllMusic praised Born Free, saying it "goes a long, long way toward keeping that heartland flame burning bright: it’s familiar yet fresh, and song for song it’s the best album Kid Rock has cut since Devil Without a Cause. This album was number 16 on Rolling Stone's list of the 30 Best Albums of 2010.

== Track listing ==
All tracks are written by R. J. Ritchie and Marlon Young, except where noted.

No.	Title	Length
1.	"Born Free"	5:14
2.	"Slow My Roll"	4:19
3.	"Care" (featuring Martina McBride and T.I.) (Ritchie, Young, Clifford Harris)	4:12
4.	"Purple Sky" (Ritchie, Young, Jason Boland)	4:06
5.	"When It Rains"	4:46
6.	"God Bless Saturday"	3:35
7.	"Collide" (featuring Sheryl Crow and Bob Seger on piano)	4:49
8.	"Flyin' High" (featuring Zac Brown)	4:03
9.	"Times Like These"	5:57
10.	"Rock On"	5:23
11.	"Rock Bottom Blues"	3:51
12.	"For the First Time (In a Long Time)"	5:46

Target bonus tracks

13. "Rock n Roll Jesus" (live)
14. "Lowlife (Living the Highlife)/Keep Your Hands to Yourself" (live)
15. "Care" (Demo Version with Mary J. Blige)

== Racing Father Time EP ==
1. "The Midwest Fall"
2. "Lonely Road of Faith" (Alt. version)
3. "Slow My Roll" (Porch version)
4. "Forty"

== Personnel ==
- Kid Rock - lead vocals, guitar
- Marlon Young - lead guitar
- David Hidalgo - guitar
- Matt Sweeney - guitar
- Justin Meldal-Johnsen - bass
- Lenny Castro - percussion
- Chad Smith - drums, percussion
- Benmont Tench - keyboards, piano
- Blake Mills - banjo, guitar

Additional personnel

- Bob Seger - piano on "Collide"
- Sheryl Crow - vocals on "Collide"
- Zac Brown - vocals on "Flying High"
- T.I. - vocals on "Care"
- Martina McBride - vocals on "Care"
- Mary J. Blige- vocals on " Care (Demo Version)"
- Trace Adkins- background vocals on "Rock Bottom Blues"

== Charts ==
=== Weekly charts ===
Chart (2010)	Peak position
Austrian Albums (Ö3 Austria)	7
Canadian Albums (Billboard)	11
German Albums (Offizielle Top 100)	9
Swiss Albums (Schweizer Hitparade)	7
US Billboard 200	5
US Top Rock Albums (Billboard)	1

=== Year-end charts ===
Chart (2010)	Position
German Albums (Offizielle Top 100)	92
Swiss Albums (Schweizer Hitparade)	89
Chart (2011)	Position
US Billboard 200	16
US Top Rock Albums (Billboard)	2

== Certifications ==
Region	Certification	Certified units/sales
Canada (Music Canada)	Gold	40,000^{^}
United States (RIAA)	Platinum	1,000,000^{^}
^{^} Shipments figures based on certification alone.
