= The History of Rock =

Compilation album by Kid Rock
- Released: May 30, 2000
- Studios: White Room Studios (Detroit, Michigan)
- Genres: Rap rock; rap metal; nu metal
- Length: 64:46
- Labels: Lava; Atlantic; Top Dog

Kid Rock chronology
Devil Without a Cause (1998)	The History of Rock (2000)	Cocky (2001)

Singles from The History of Rock
- 1. "American Bad Ass" Released: April 18, 2000

The History of Rock is a compilation album by American rapper Kid Rock. Released in 2000, the album consists of re-recorded versions of songs from Rock's 1993 album The Polyfuze Method, remixed versions of songs from his 1996 album Early Mornin' Stoned Pimp, demos and unreleased songs, including the single "American Bad Ass". The album debuted at number two on the Billboard 200, with first week sales of 457,000 copies.

== Music ==
Many of the compilation's songs were previously released on Kid Rock's second and third studio albums, The Polyfuze Method and Early Mornin' Stoned Pimp. The inclusions from The Polyfuze Method have been re-recorded for this compilation, while the songs from Early Mornin' Stoned Pimp are remixed.

The new recording "American Bad Ass" has been praised by AllMusic and Rolling Stone as being the best song on the compilation. The nu metal song is built around samples from Metallica's song "Sad but True", while paying lyrical tribute to Ritchie's influences such as Johnny Cash, Grandmaster Flash, David Allan Coe, the Beastie Boys and Bob Seger.

Also new to this compilation are the songs "Abortion", a hard rock blues song, "Fuck That", categorized by Entertainment Weekly as alternative rock, and "Born 2 B a Hick", which has been compared stylistically to Chuck Berry. "Fuck That" previously appeared on the soundtrack to the 1999 film Any Given Sunday.

"Born 2 B a Hick" was an older song that Kid Rock had never recorded. Despite its title, "Abortion" is an anti-drug ballad, which Rolling Stone described as "[finding] common ground between the Geto Boys and Lynyrd Skynyrd".

== Reception ==
Professional ratings
Aggregate scores
Source	Rating
Metacritic	64/100
Review scores
Source	Rating
AllMusic	4/5 stars
The Encyclopedia of Popular Music	3/5 stars
Entertainment Weekly	C
Dotmusic	3/5 stars
Kerrang!	3/5 stars
NME	6/10
Rolling Stone	3/5 stars
The Rolling Stone Album Guide	3/5 stars
Spin	5/10
Wall of Sound	77/100

According to the review aggregator Metacritic, The History of Rock received "generally favorable reviews" based on a weighted average score of 64 out of 100 from 12 critic scores.

Kid Rock promoted the album with his History of Rock Tour.

Stephen Thomas Erlewine, writing for AllMusic, gave the album four out of five stars. He stated that "It's not a great listen, but its swagger and white-trash style make it the second-best record in [Kid Rock's] catalog to date".

Rob Sheffield, writing for Rolling Stone, gave the album three out of five stars, writing that "History peaks with the two new songs". Entertainment Weekly panned the album, however, giving it a C, writing, "Perhaps this marginal collection by a potentially major act should have been called The History of Rap (by White Boys)".

== Track listing ==
No.	Title	Writer(s)	Recording source	Length
1.	"Intro"	Robert Ritchie (Kid Rock); Wes Gandy (Wes Chill)		1:08
2.	"American Bad Ass"	Ritchie; James Hetfield; Lars Ulrich	New track	4:32
3.	"Prodigal Son"	Ritchie	Re-recorded from The Polyfuze Method	6:41
4.	"Paid"	Ritchie	Remixed from Early Mornin' Stoned Pimp	4:45
5.	"Early Mornin' Stoned Pimp" (featuring Joe C.)	Ritchie; Martin Gross	Remixed from Early Mornin' Stoned Pimp	7:14
6.	"Dark & Gray"	Ritchie	Re-recorded from the EP Bootleg: August 1994	4:56
7.	"3 Sheets to the Wind (What's My Name?)"	Ritchie	Re-recorded from The Polyfuze Method	3:59
8.	"Abortion"	Ritchie	Previously unreleased	4:29
9.	"I Wanna Go Back"	Ritchie	Remixed from Early Mornin' Stoned Pimp	5:29
10.	"Ya' Keep On"	Ritchie; Barbara Lomas; Carlos Ward; Dennis Rowe; Louis Risbrook; William Risbrook; Orlando Woods; Richard Thompson	Remixed from Early Mornin' Stoned Pimp	3:57
11.	"Fuck That"	Ritchie	Previously released on the Any Given Sunday soundtrack	3:42
12.	"Fuck U Blind" (Not featured on clean version)	Ritchie	Re-recorded from The Polyfuze Method	3:57
13.	"Born 2 B a Hick"	Ritchie	Unreleased demo	1:42
14.	"My Oedipus Complex" (featuring Twisted Brown Trucker)	Ritchie	Re-recorded from The Polyfuze Method	8:19

== Credits ==
=== Kid Rock ===
- Robert James Ritchie – vocals, guitar, bass, keyboard, organ, drums

=== Twisted Brown Trucker ===
- Joe C. – raps
- Shirley Hayden – background vocals
- Misty Love – background vocals
- Jason Krause – guitar
- Kenny Olson – guitar
- Michael Bradford – bass
- Jimmie Bones – keyboards
- Uncle Kracker – turntables, background vocals
- Stefanie Eulinberg – drums

=== Other personnel ===
- Wes Chill – spoken word on intro
- Michael Stevens – narration

== Charts ==
=== Weekly charts ===
Chart (2000)	Peak position
Austrian Albums (Ö3 Austria)	13
Canadian Albums (Billboard)	3
German Albums (Offizielle Top 100)	15
Scottish Albums (Official Charts)	50
Swiss Albums (Schweizer Hitparade)	23
UK Albums (Official Charts)	73
US Billboard 200	2

=== Year-end charts ===
Chart (2000)	Position
Canadian Albums (Nielsen SoundScan)	35
German Albums (Offizielle Top 100)	77
US Billboard 200	40

== Certifications ==
Region	Certification	Certified units/sales
Canada (Music Canada)	2× Platinum	200,000^{^}
United Kingdom (BPI)	Silver	60,000^{^}
United States (RIAA)	2× Platinum	2,000,000^{^}
^{^} Shipments figures based on certification alone.
