= American Bad Ass =

2000 single by Kid Rock

Single by Kid Rock

from the album The History of Rock
- Released: May 2, 2000
- Genre: Rap metal; nu metal
- Length: 4:32
- Label: Atlantic; Lava; Top Dog
- Songwriters: Kid Rock; James Hetfield; Lars Ulrich
- Producers: Kid Rock; Uncle Kracker

Kid Rock singles chronology
"Wasting Time" (2000)	"American Bad Ass" (2000)	"Forever" (2001)

Music video
- "American Bad Ass" on YouTube

"American Bad Ass" is a song by the American musician Kid Rock, released as a single from his 2000 compilation album, The History of Rock, in May 2000. The song samples Metallica's "Sad but True".

== Music video ==
The music video for the single aired on MTV2 upon release, and reached number one on Canada's MuchMusic Countdown. The video features a cameo appearance by Ron Jeremy and was the last music video to feature Joe C. before his death.

At the beginning of the video, Kid Rock watches TV and then after going to a rapping party, he goes to a concert on a cabriolet, surrounded by bikers. At the middle of the song, Kid Rock's car explodes and the thrash metal party starts to play. At the end of the video, Kid Rock with his band plays at a concert on the stage.

== Track listing ==
1. "American Bad Ass" (clean album version)
2. "3 Sheets to the Wind" (live)
3. "Cowboy" (live)

== Charts ==
=== Weekly charts ===
Chart (2000)	Peak position
Canada Rock/Alternative (RPM)	24
Europe (Eurochart Hot 100)	53
Germany (GfK)	26
Ireland (IRMA)	30
Scottish Singles Sales (Official Charts)	17
Switzerland (Schweizer Hitparade)	81
UK Singles (Official Charts)	25
US Alternative Airplay (Billboard)	33
US Mainstream Rock (Billboard)	20

=== Year-end charts ===
Chart (2000)	Position
US Mainstream Rock Tracks (Billboard)	65

== Release history ==
Region	Date	Format(s)	Label(s)	Ref.
United States	May 2, 2000	Mainstream rock; active rock; alternative radio	Atlantic; Lava; Top Dog	
United Kingdom	August 28, 2000	CD; cassette	Atlantic; Lava; Top Dog	

== In popular culture ==
- After the USS Cole bombing in October 2000, the song was played on the ship's PA system upon leaving the port of Yemen after the national anthem and other patriotic songs were played.
- In 2001, the glam metal band Tuff recorded a parody of the song entitled "American Hair Band", which made references to numerous similar bands of the era, as well as criticizing grunge and alternative rock. The "Sad but True" instrumental structure has been re-recorded for the parody.
- A version of the song was used as the entrance theme for WWF (now WWE) wrestler The Undertaker in 2000 for his "American Badass" persona. It was replaced by Limp Bizkit's "Rollin" in the same year. 23 years later, The Undertaker reused the song as his entrance theme for his post-retirement appearances in WWE, first at WWE Raw is XXX in January 2023 and then on the October 10, 2023, episode of WWE NXT.
- During the 2024 Republican National Convention, Kid Rock reworked the song into a call cheering on Donald Trump. It is also used as Trump's entrance song attending UFC events.
