= Born Free (Kid Rock song) =

Single by Kid Rock

from the album Born Free
- Released: October 29, 2010
- Recorded: 2010
- Studio: Shangri-La
- Genre: Country
- Length: 5:13; 4:24 (edit)
- Label: Atlantic
- Songwriters: R. J. Ritchie, Marlon Young
- Producer: Rick Rubin

Kid Rock singles chronology
"Blue Jeans and a Rosary" (2008)	"Born Free" (2010)	"God Bless Saturday" (2011)

Music video
- "Born Free" on YouTube

"Born Free" is a song by Kid Rock from his eighth studio album of the same name. It was released as the lead single for the album on October 29, 2010, which was released on November 16, 2010.

== Music video ==
A music video was also filmed for the single, filming took place in the Upper Peninsula of Michigan. It features Rock driving through the valleys in his car and on his motorcycle throughout the video. The farm he is standing in the field of is Cook's Farm Dairy in Ortonville. At the end of the video, Kid Rock is seen on a beach along the Pictured Rocks National Lakeshore on Lake Superior finishing up the song.

== Chart performance ==
Chart (2010–11)	Peak position
Austria (Ö3 Austria Top 40)	21
European Hot 100	95
Germany (Media Control AG)	23
Italy (FIMI)	97
Switzerland (Media Control AG)	42
US Adult Contemporary (Billboard)	26
US Adult Pop Airplay (Billboard)	39
US Hot Country Songs (Billboard)	52
US Mainstream Rock Songs (Billboard)	14
US Rock Songs (Billboard)	31

== Mitt Romney campaign ==
It was announced on December 7, 2011, that Republican hopeful Mitt Romney would use the song as his campaign theme song. Kid Rock subsequently issued a statement saying "He and anyone else who wants to use my song do not need my permission. I said he could use it and I would say the same for any other candidate."

On February 27, 2012, Kid Rock joined Romney at a campaign rally in Detroit and performed the song. "He loves Michigan and Detroit and so do I," Romney said. The rally occurred on the eve of the Michigan Republican primary, which saw Romney defeat Rick Santorum.

Kid Rock also performed the song at Red Rocks, Colorado during the Romney campaign for a Rally. He also performed it at the Verizon Wireless Arena in Manchester, New Hampshire at an "Election Eve Rally" with Romney which was the largest political event in New Hampshire history.

== In other uses ==
"Born Free" was featured in the TBS cable network's 2010 Major League Baseball postseason coverage and is touted as an ode to American troops.

He also performed it at the Detroit Lions Thanksgiving Day game in 2010.

Beginning on July 8, 2014, Detroit-based Chevrolet used the song to promote their summer sales.

WWE used the song for their annual Tribute to the Troops special.
