= Picture (song) =

2002 single by Kid Rock

- Remix cover

Single by Kid Rock featuring Sheryl Crow or Allison Moorer

from the album Cocky
- Released: November 12, 2002
- Genre: Country
- Length: 4:58 (Sheryl Crow album version); 5:07 (Allison Moorer album version)
- Label: Atlantic; Lava
- Songwriters: R. J. Ritchie; Sheryl Crow
- Producer: Kid Rock

Kid Rock singles chronology
"You Never Met a Motherfucker Quite Like Me" (2002)	"Picture" (2002)	"Feel Like Makin' Love" (2003)

Sheryl Crow singles chronology
"C'mon C'mon" (2002)	"Picture" (2002)	"The First Cut Is the Deepest" (2003)

Allison Moorer singles chronology
"Think It Over" (2001)	"Picture" (2002)	"Tumbling Down" (2002)

Audio sample
- file; help

Music video
- "Picture" (Sheryl Crow version) on YouTube

"Picture" is a duet written by American music artists Kid Rock and Sheryl Crow, released on November 12, 2002, as the fourth single and ninth track from Kid Rock's 2001 album Cocky. The original recording on the album is performed by the song's writers. Rock re-recorded the song for radio with alternative country singer Allison Moorer because Atlantic was initially unable to get the rights from Crow's label to release the album version as a single. When the Moorer version was released, some radio stations began playing the Crow version instead, leading Billboard to credit the song variously to Kid Rock featuring Sheryl Crow or Allison Moorer. The song was a commercial and critical success and was nominated for Vocal Event of the Year at the 2003 Country Music Association awards.

== Background ==
Kid Rock's label, Atlantic Records, was unable to obtain permission from Crow's label, A&M Records, to release the original version as a single. Therefore, Atlantic Records decided to rework the song with country singer Allison Moorer (coincidentally signed to A&M's sister label Universal South Records) instead. Moorer re-recorded Crow’s vocals for the radio release.

Even though Atlantic Records was unable to obtain rights to release Crow's version as a single, mainstream, rock/alternative, and some country radio stations disregarded this and played the original version featuring Crow, while other country music radio stations played the radio edit featuring Allison Moorer instead. Because of this, Billboard credited the song on the charts as Kid Rock featuring Sheryl Crow or Allison Moorer. Each version of the song features a different guitar solo.

== Composition ==
The song is performed in the key of G major in common time with a tempo of 98 beats per minute. The verses of the song follow a chord progression of G–C–D–C–G, and the chorus follows an Em–G–D–C–G progression. The vocals span from G_{2} to D_{5}.

== Chart performance ==
Being the third Kid Rock single that entered Billboard's Hot 100 chart, "Picture" remains his highest-charting single in the United States, peaking at No. 4 in April 2003. The song also charted on the Hot Country Singles & Tracks chart, peaking at No. 21. Until 2008's "All Summer Long", it also marked his only top-40 country hit. The song is also Sheryl Crow's second-most successful single in the United States, after her 1994 hit "All I Wanna Do" which reached No. 2. It is Kid Rock's only top-10 hit on the Hot 100.

On the Hot Country Singles & Tracks chart, the song was credited only to Kid Rock and Crow for 22 weeks. By then, the single had reached No. 33 on the chart. The following week, however, the song began to be credited to Kid Rock featuring Sheryl Crow or Allison Moorer. The song spent a total of 33 weeks on the country chart, reaching No. 21 in 2003. As of September 2017, "Picture" sold 836,300 copies in the United States according to Nielsen SoundScan.

== Music video ==
Even though Crow's label did not release licensing permissions for the original version, Crow was featured in the music video singing instead of Moorer. The video takes place in a studio showing Rock and Crow recording the song, accompanied by clips of the duo hanging out in the winter time. During the guitar solo, Rock is seen wearing a cowboy hat and winter jacket while walking alone in a field covered in snow. The video also features a few uses of the monochrome effect, while most of the video is in color. It was directed by JB Carlin.

== Live performances ==
Kid Rock performed "Picture" with LeAnn Rimes on his 2003 Christmas TV special, A Kid Rock Christmas. A live performance he had of the song with Gretchen Wilson was released as a track on his 2006 album Live Trucker. He performed the song at a concert with Martina McBride for the 2009 TV special CMA Music Festival: Country's Night to Rock. Kid Rock has also sung the song live with female country singers Kellie Pickler, Miranda Lambert and Jessie James. When the song is performed live, the music pauses while Kid Rock holds out the lyric "I was off to drink you away", following the lyric "I was headed to church".

== Track listings ==
US CD single with Allison Moorer

1. "Picture" (radio edit) – 4:13
2. "Picture" (long version edit) – 4:59
3. "Picture" (long version) – 4:59

US CD single with Sheryl Crow

1. "Picture" (radio edit 1) – 4:14
2. "Picture" (radio edit 2) – 4:09
3. "Picture" (album edit) – 4:14
4. "Picture" (album version) – 4:58

== Charts ==
=== Weekly charts ===
Weekly chart performance for "Picture"
Chart (2002–2003)	Peak position
Canada (Nielsen SoundScan)	2
US Billboard Hot 100	4
US Adult Contemporary (Billboard)	17
US Adult Pop Airplay (Billboard)	2
US Hot Country Songs (Billboard)	21
US Pop Airplay (Billboard)	5
US Top 40 Tracks (Billboard)	4

=== Year-end charts ===
Year-end chart performance for "Picture"
Chart (2003)	Position
US Billboard Hot 100	9
US Adult Contemporary (Billboard)	31
US Adult Top 40 (Billboard)	11
US Hot Country Singles & Tracks (Billboard)	76
US Mainstream Top 40 (Billboard)	14

== Certifications ==
Certifications for "Picture"
Region	Certification	Certified units/sales
New Zealand (RMNZ)	Gold	15,000^{‡}
United States (RIAA)	Gold	500,000^{^}
^{^} Shipments figures based on certification alone.^{‡} Sales+streaming figures based on certification alone.
