= Joe C. =

American rapper (1974–2000)

- Joe C. in 1999

Background information
- Born: Joseph Michael Calleja; November 9, 1974; Trenton, Michigan, U.S.
- Died: November 16, 2000 (aged 26) Taylor, Michigan, U.S.
- Genres: Hip hop; rap rock; rap metal; nu metal
- Occupations: Rapper; hype man
- Years active: 1994–2000
- Label: Top Dog
- Formerly of: Twisted Brown Trucker

Joseph Michael Calleja (November 9, 1974 – November 16, 2000), known by his stage name Joe C., was an American rapper, best known for being a hype man for fellow rapper Kid Rock.

== Early life ==
Calleja was born in the Detroit suburb of Trenton, Michigan, and grew up in nearby Taylor. Since childhood, he had been treated for celiac disease, a chronic autoimmune disorder that limited his height to 3 ft 9 in (1.14 m), and required him to take dozens of pills and undergo dialysis daily.

== Career ==
Calleja first met Detroit-area musician Kid Rock at a concert by the latter in Roseville, Michigan, in 1994. Rock initially mistook Calleja for a child. "He used to come to all my shows. He'd be standing on tables in the front row singing the lyrics." Rock subsequently brought Calleja into his act as a rapper and hype man: "He's talking and I'm like, would you like a job? He's like, I can't do anything. I'm like, it's not important right now. I was like, you got attitude flying all over this room. I was like, I'll teach you everything you need to know," Rock said.

In 1997, Calleja posed with two naked strippers for an album cover for rapper Shortcut. A photo lab reported the image as possible child pornography, but the investigation was closed less than a day later when Calleja verified his age to be 23.

Calleja also appeared on television, including a guest role with Kid Rock in the animated series The Simpsons, in the season 11 episode "Kill the Alligator and Run". Calleja was a World Wrestling Federation fan and made various references to the WWF stable D-Generation X during concerts. He appeared on the May 18, 2000, edition of WWF Smackdown during a taping in Detroit to drink beer with The Acolytes, and on the May 29 edition of Raw is War, helping Too Cool win their only WWF Tag Team Championship in 2000 from Edge and Christian. He was also featured posthumously in the animated film Osmosis Jones as a part of Kidney Rock.

== Death ==
On November 16, 2000, one week after his 26th birthday, Calleja died in his sleep at his parents' home in Taylor, Michigan, of complications from celiac disease. His death was determined to be from natural causes and no autopsy was performed. Kid Rock released a statement on Calleja's death: "Family and friends are everything; without them, all of the fame and fortune means nothing. We have lost part of our family. Joey gave us, and the world, his love. He brought a smile to everyone who has ever known or seen him. In a world full of confusion, Joey made all of us laugh. No matter what color, religion, race, or beliefs we have, he made us all smile. He gave us the gift of joy. Joey, thank you. We will never forget you. We love you." Rock dedicated his 2001 album Cocky to Calleja.

== Discography ==
=== With Kid Rock ===
- Devil Without a Cause (1998)
- The History of Rock (2000)
- Live Trucker (2006)

=== Soundtracks ===
- South Park: Bigger, Longer & Uncut (1999)
- Osmosis Jones (2001)

== See also ==
- List of people diagnosed with coeliac disease
