= Kid Rock =

American musician (born 1971)

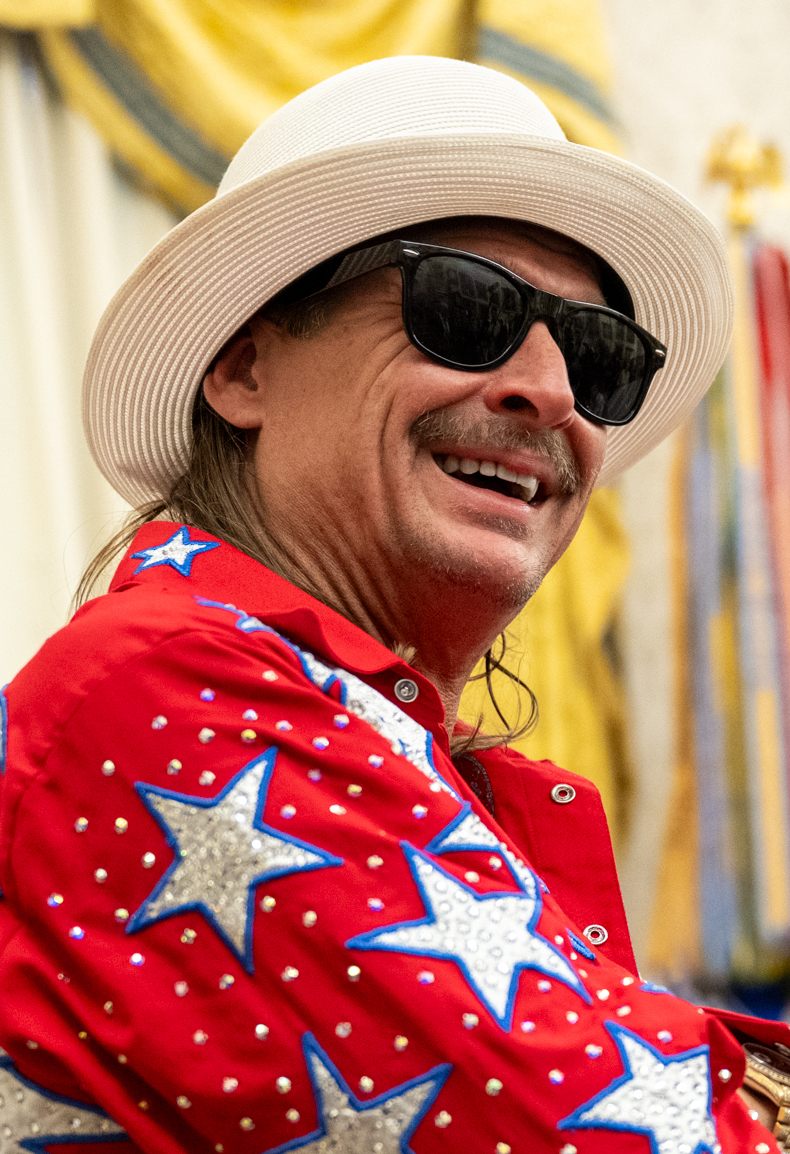
- Kid Rock at the White House in 2025

Background information
- Also known as: Bobby Shazam
- Born: Robert James Ritchie; January 17, 1971 (age 55); Dearborn, Michigan, U.S.
- Genres: Rock; hip-hop; country; heavy metal
- Occupations: Musician; singer; rapper; songwriter
- Instruments: Vocals; guitar
- Years active: 1988–present
- Labels: Top Dog; Broken Bow; Warner Bros.; Lava; Atlantic; Jive
- Member of: Twisted Brown Trucker
- Spouse: Pamela Anderson (m. 2006; div. 2007)
- Children: 1
- Relatives: Jill Ritchie (sister)
- Website: kidrock.com

Robert James Ritchie (born January 17, 1971), known professionally as Kid Rock, is an American musician, singer, rapper, and songwriter. After establishing himself in the Detroit hip-hop scene, he broke through into mainstream success with a rap rock sound before shifting his performance style to country rock. A self-taught musician, he can play every instrument in his backing band and has overseen production on all but two of his albums.

Kid Rock started his music career as a rapper, releasing his debut album, Grits Sandwiches for Breakfast (1990), on Jive Records. His subsequent independent releases, The Polyfuze Method (1993) and Early Mornin' Stoned Pimp (1996), saw him developing a more distinctive style, which was fully realized on his breakthrough album, Devil Without a Cause (1998), which sold 14 million copies. This album and its follow-up, Cocky (2001), were noted for blending elements of hip-hop, country, and rock. His most successful single from that time period, "Cowboy" (1999), is considered a pioneering song in the country rap genre. His best-selling singles overall are "Picture" (2002) and "All Summer Long" (2008).

His 2003 self-titled album and Rock n Roll Jesus (2007) saw him distance further from his rap rock sound and moving towards country rock. He has since released Born Free (2010), Rebel Soul (2012), First Kiss (2015), and Sweet Southern Sugar (2017). He has made a return to his rap rock sound on his latest album, Bad Reputation (2022).

A self-described libertarian, Kid Rock has drawn controversy for his former use of the Confederate flag and his political statements. He is a vocal supporter of the U.S. Republican Party and United States president Donald Trump.

== Early life ==
Robert James Ritchie was born in Dearborn, Michigan, (Note: Kid Rock said that he was born in Dearborn, although other reports say he is born in Romeo, Michigan.) on January 17, 1971, the son of Susan (née Brabbs) and William "Bill" Ritchie (1941–2024), who owned multiple car dealerships. He was raised in his father's large home on extensive property, which included an apple orchard and barnyard for their horses. He attended Romeo High School. His younger sister, Jill Ritchie, is an actress. In the 1980s, Ritchie became interested in hip-hop, began to breakdance, and taught himself how to rap and DJ while performing in talent shows in and around Detroit.

== Career ==
=== Early career, signing with Jive Records, and Grits Sandwiches for Breakfast (1988–1991) ===
Kid Rock began his professional music career as a member of a hip-hop group called the Beast Crew in the late 1980s. During this time, he met D-Nice. That relationship would eventually lead to him becoming the opening act at local shows for Boogie Down Productions. During this time, Kid Rock began a professional association with producer Mike E. Clark, initially skeptical with his race, found himself impressed with Kid Rock's energetic and well-received performance where the artist showcased his own beats using his turntables and equipment to demonstrate his skills for Clark.

In 1988, Clark produced a series of demos with Kid Rock. These demos eventually led to offers from six major record labels, including Atlantic and CBS Records. By the following year, Kid Rock became a shareholder in Top Dog Records, an independent record label formed by Alvin Williams and Earl Blunt of EB-Bran Productions. The investment later became a 25% ownership stake. With the help of D-Nice, Kid Rock signed with Jive Records at the age of 17, releasing his debut studio album, Grits Sandwiches for Breakfast in 1990.

The album made Kid Rock one of the two biggest rap stars in Detroit in 1990, along with local independent rapper Esham. To promote the album, Kid Rock toured nationally with Ice Cube, D-Nice, Yo-Yo and Too Short; Detroit artist James "Blackman" Harris served as Kid Rock's DJ on this tour. During in-store promotions for the album, Kid Rock met and developed a friendship with local rapper Eminem, who frequently challenged Kid Rock to rap battles. However, according to Kid Rock, his contract with Jive resulted in animosity from fellow rapper Vanilla Ice, who felt that he should have been signed with Jive instead of Kid Rock. Ultimately, these unfavorable comparisons led to Jive dropping Kid Rock, according to Mike E. Clark.

=== Signing with Continuum Records and The Polyfuze Method (1992–1995) ===
In 1992, Kid Rock signed with local independent record label Continuum. Around this time, Kid Rock met local hip-hop duo Insane Clown Posse through Mike E. Clark, who was producing the duo. While ICP member Violent J disliked Kid Rock's music, he wanted the rapper to appear on ICP's debut album, Carnival of Carnage, believing the appearance would gain ICP notice, since Kid Rock was a nationally successful artist. Noting that local rapper Esham was paid $500 to appear on ICP's album, Violent J claims that Kid Rock demanded $600 (equivalent to $1,377 in 2025) to record his guest appearance, alleging that Esham and Kid Rock had a feud over who was the bigger rapper. Kid Rock showed up to record the song "Is That You?" intoxicated, but re-recorded his vocals and record scratching the following day.

In 1993, Kid Rock recorded and released his second studio album, The Polyfuze Method, with producer Mike E. Clark, who worked with Kid Rock to help give the album more of a rock-oriented sound than his debut. He also began releasing his "Bootleg" cassette series to keep local interest in his music. Later in the year, Kid Rock recorded the EP Fire It Up at White Room Studios in downtown Detroit, run by brothers Michael and Andrew Nehra, who were forming the rock-soul band Robert Bradley's Blackwater Surprise. The EP featured the heavy rock song "I Am the Bullgod" and a cover of Hank Williams Jr.'s country song "A Country Boy Can Survive".

By 1994, Kid Rock's live performances had mostly been backed by DJs Blackman and Uncle Kracker, but Kid Rock soon began to utilize more and more live instrumentation into his performances, forming the rock band Twisted Brown Trucker. After breaking up with his girlfriend, Kid Rock moved engineer Bob Ebeling into his apartment. During a recording session with Mike E. Clark, the producer discovered that Kid Rock could sing when he recorded a reworked cover of Billy Joel's "It's Still Rock and Roll to Me", entitled "It's Still East Detroit to Me", which Clark claims led him to encourage Kid Rock to sing more. Through extensive promoting, including distributing tapes on consignment to local stores and giving away free samplers of his music, Kid Rock developed a following among an audience which DJ Uncle Kracker described as "white kids who dropped acid and liked listening to gangsta rap"; this following included local rapper Joe C., who had been attending Kid Rock concerts as a fan, but upon meeting him personally, was invited to perform on stage as his hype man.

=== Early Mornin' Stoned Pimp and local breakthrough (1996) ===
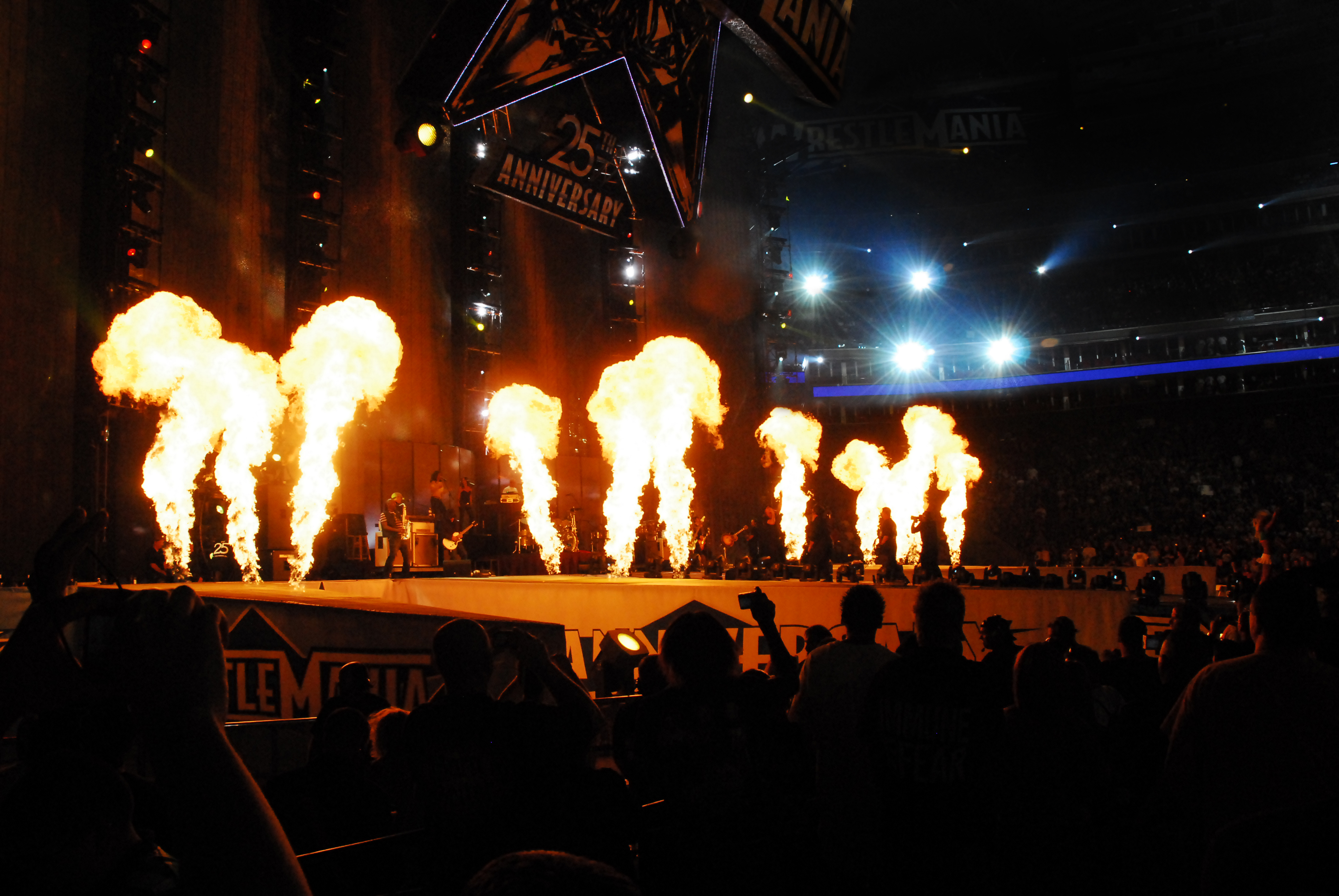
A display of pyrotechnics during one of Kid Rock's performances. His stage presence helped increase his local following in Detroit in the mid-1990s.

Kid Rock's stage presence became honed with the addition of a light show, pyrotechnics, dancers and a light-up backdrop bearing the name "Kid Rock", and 1996 saw the release of his most rock-oriented album to date, Early Mornin' Stoned Pimp; the album's title came from Bob Eberling, who told a sleepless, alcoholic, drug-using Kid Rock, "Dude, you are the early-morning, stoned pimp." According to Kid Rock, who distributed the album himself, Early Mornin' Stoned Pimp sold 14,000 copies. Kid Rock developed his stage persona, performing dressed in 1970s pimp clothing with a real, possibly loaded, gun down the front of his pants. Although Kid Rock was known for his frequent partying and drug and alcohol use, he primarily focused on increasing his success and fame, prioritizing his role as a businessman. This drive led to increased local success.

=== Signing with Atlantic Records, Devil Without a Cause, and national success (1997–2000) ===
Kid Rock's attorney, Tommy Valentino, increased his stature by helping him get articles written about Kid Rock and Twisted Brown Trucker in major publications, including Beastie Boys' Grand Royal magazine. However, though his management tried to interest local record labels in his music, they told his management team that they were not interested in signing a white rapper, to which Valentino told them, "He's not a white rapper. He's a rock star and everything in between." In 1997, Jason Flom, head of Lava Records, attended one of Kid Rock's performances and met with Kid Rock, who later gave him a demo containing the songs "Somebody's Gotta Feel This" and "I Got One for Ya", which led to Kid Rock signing with Atlantic Records. As part of his recording deal, Kid Rock received $150,000 from the label. By this time Kid Rock had fully developed his stage persona, and musical style and wanted to make a "redneck, shit-kicking rock 'n' roll rap" album, resulting in his fourth studio album, Devil Without a Cause, recorded at the White Room in Detroit and mixed at the Mix Room in Los Angeles.

Carried by singles such as "Bawitdaba" and "Cowboy", the album was a commercial success as it would be certified Gold and Platinum several months after its release, and eventually sold over 14 million copies. In promotion of the record, Kid Rock would join Limp Bizkit on a national tour spanning 27 dates. He participated in the Vans Warped Tour in 1998, along with NOFX, Deftones, Dropkick Murphys and Cherry Poppin' Daddies. He performed at Woodstock 1999 and made an appearance on the 1999 MTV VMA, including a performance alongside Aerosmith and Run-DMC. In 1999, Kid Rock made his voice acting debut in an episode of The Simpsons in the episode "Kill the Alligator and Run" playing himself, alongside rapper Joe C. Despite having been active in the music industry for over 10 years by then, Kid Rock was nominated for a Grammy Award for Best New Artist of 2000. Kid Rock's career was sometimes marked by tragedy, as in the death of friend and collaborator Joe C.

In May 2000, Kid Rock released the compilation album The History of Rock behind the single "American Bad Ass". The song sampled Metallica's 1991 song "Sad but True", peaking at No. 20 on the mainstream rock chart. Kid Rock would join Metallica on their 2000 Summer Sanitarium Tour along with Korn and System of a Down. Kid Rock and Jonathan Davis filled in on vocals for an injured James Hetfield in Atlanta on July 7, 2000. Kid Rock performed "American Bad Ass" along with the Metallica classics "Sad but True", "Nothing Else Matters", "Fuel" and "Enter Sandman" in addition to covers of "Turn the Page" and "Fortunate Son". The History of Rock was certified double platinum.

=== Continued success and shift away from hip-hop (2001–2008) ===
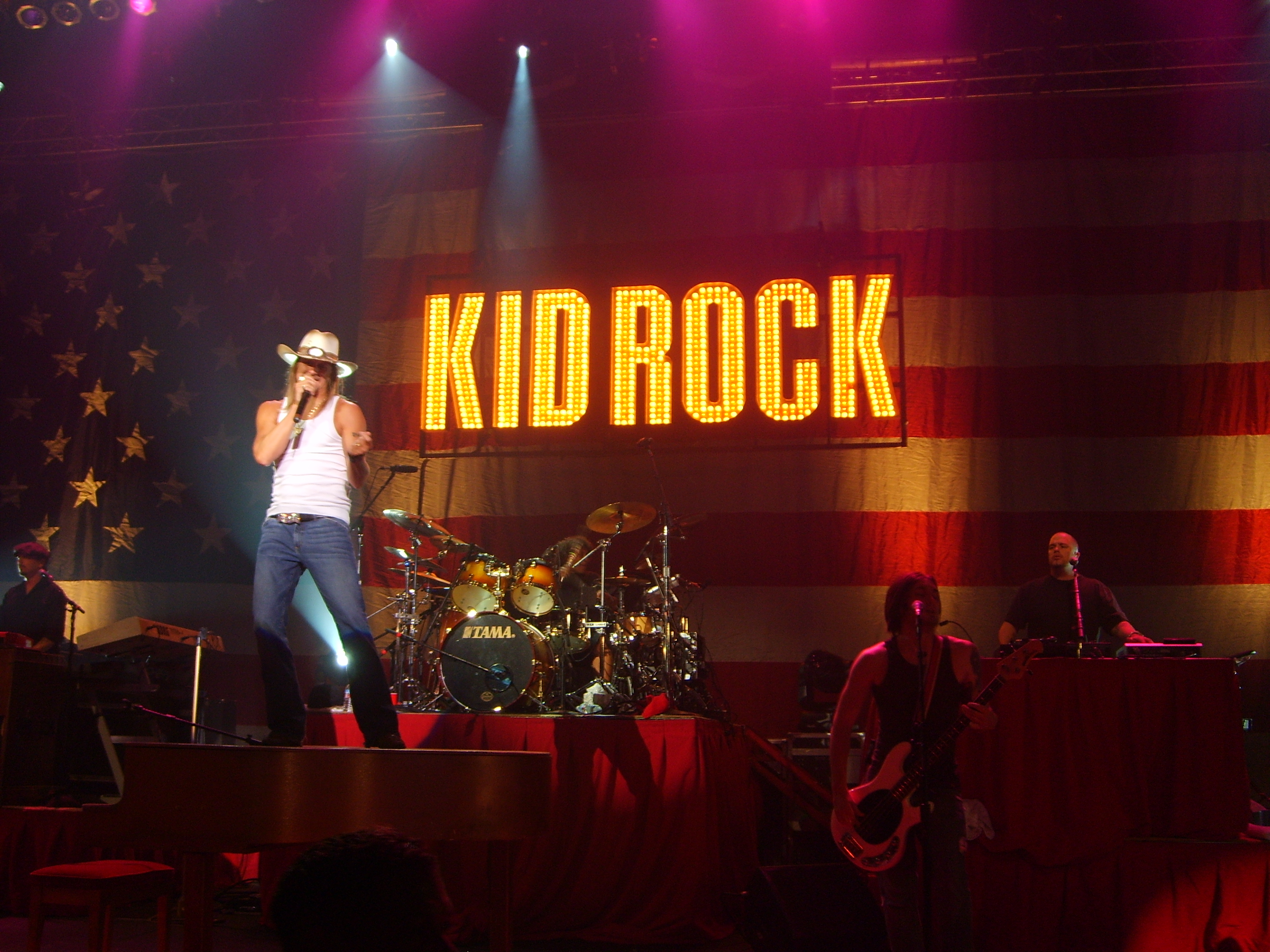
Kid Rock performing in Denver, Colorado in 2006

In 2001, "American Bad Ass" was nominated for the Grammy for Best Hard Rock Performance, losing out to Rage Against the Machine's "Guerrilla Radio". Kid Rock appeared in the comedy film Joe Dirt, starring David Spade. Kid Rock was in the live-action/animated film Osmosis Jones, voicing a bacterial cell version of himself named "Kidney Rock"; Kid Rock and Joe C. had also recorded the song "Cool Daddy Cool" for the film's soundtrack album before Joe C.'s death.

In November 2001, Kid Rock released his fifth studio album, Cocky, which was dedicated to Joe C. The album became a hit, spurred by the crossover success of the single "Picture", a country ballad featuring Sheryl Crow, which introduced Kid Rock to a wider audience and was ultimately the most successful single on the album. In support of the album, Kid Rock performed on the Cocky Tour in 2002 and opened for Aerosmith with Run-DMC on the Girls of Summer Tour. During this period, Uncle Kracker began his solo career full-time. He was replaced by underground Detroit rapper Paradime. In 2002, Kid Rock covered ZZ Top's "Legs" to serve as WWE Diva Stacy Keibler's theme song; it also appeared on the album WWF Forceable Entry. Kid Rock filed a lawsuit to gain full control over the Top Dog record label, resulting in his receiving full ownership of the label in 2003.

Kid Rock's self-titled sixth album was also released in 2003, which shifted his music further away from hip-hop; the lead single was a cover of Bad Company's "Feel Like Makin' Love". The same year, Kid Rock contributed to the tribute album I've Always Been Crazy: A Tribute to Waylon Jennings, honoring the late country singer by covering the song "Luckenbach, Texas" in collaboration with country singer Kenny Chesney. Kid Rock appeared on the track 'My Name is Robert Too' on American blues artist R. L. Burnside's final studio album, A Bothered Mind. The following year, Kid Rock released his seventh studio album, Rock n Roll Jesus, which was his first release to chart at No. 1 on the Billboard 200, selling 172,000 copies in its first week and going on to sell over 5 million copies. In July 2007, Kid Rock was featured in the cover of Rolling Stone magazine for the second time. The album's third single, "All Summer Long", became a global hit, utilizing a mash up of Lynyrd Skynyrd's "Sweet Home Alabama" and Warren Zevon's "Werewolves of London". In 2008, Kid Rock recorded and made a music video for the song "Warrior" for a National Guard advertising campaign.

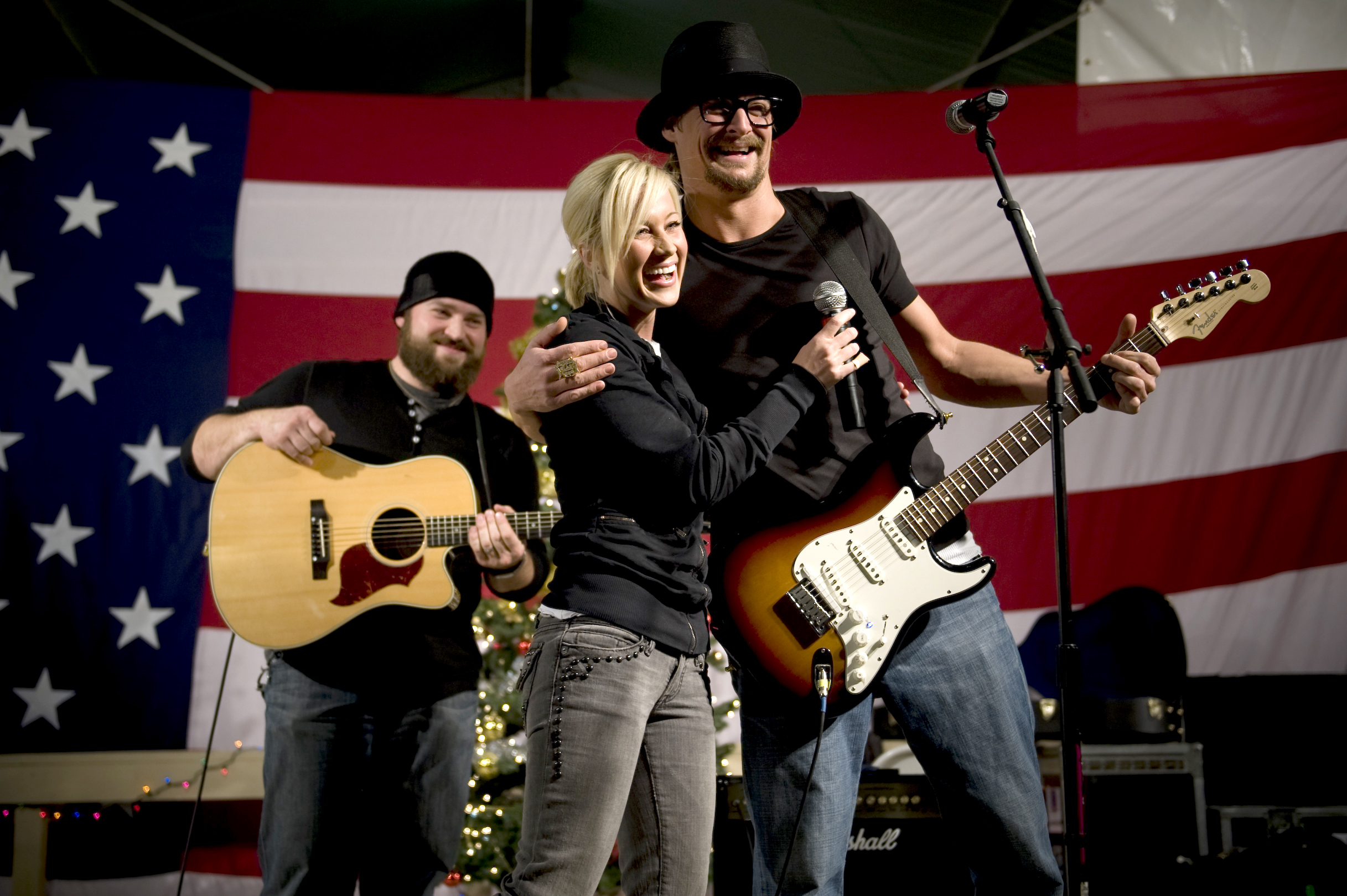
Kid Rock performing for the USO with Kellie Pickler and Zac Brown in 2008

=== Shift to country rock (2009–present) ===
In 2010, Kid Rock released his country-oriented eighth studio album, Born Free, produced by Rick Rubin, and featuring guest appearances by Sheryl Crow and Bob Seger. In 2011, Kid Rock was honored by the NAACP, which sparked protests stemming from his past display of the Confederate flag in his concerts. During the ceremony, Kid Rock elaborated on his display of the flag, stating, "[I] never flew the flag with hate in my heart [...] I love America, I love Detroit, and I love black people." Kid Rock's publicist announced that 2011 was the year he officially distanced himself from the flag.

The following year, Kid Rock performed alongside Travie McCoy and the Roots in honor of Beastie Boys, during the band's induction to the Rock and Roll Hall of Fame. 2012 also saw the release of Kid Rock's ninth studio album, Rebel Soul; he said that he wanted the album to feel like a greatest hits album, but with new songs. One of the songs on the album, "Cucci Galore", introduced Kid Rock's alter ego, Bobby Shazam. In 2013, Kid Rock performed on the "Best Night Ever" tour, where he motioned to charge no more than $20 for his tickets (equivalent to $28 in 2025). The following year, he moved to Warner Bros. Records, releasing his only album on the label, First Kiss, which he self-produced. The album debuted at number two on the Billboard 200 and sold more than 354,000 copies in the United States. Subsequently, after leaving Warner Bros., Kid Rock signed with the country label Broken Bow Records.

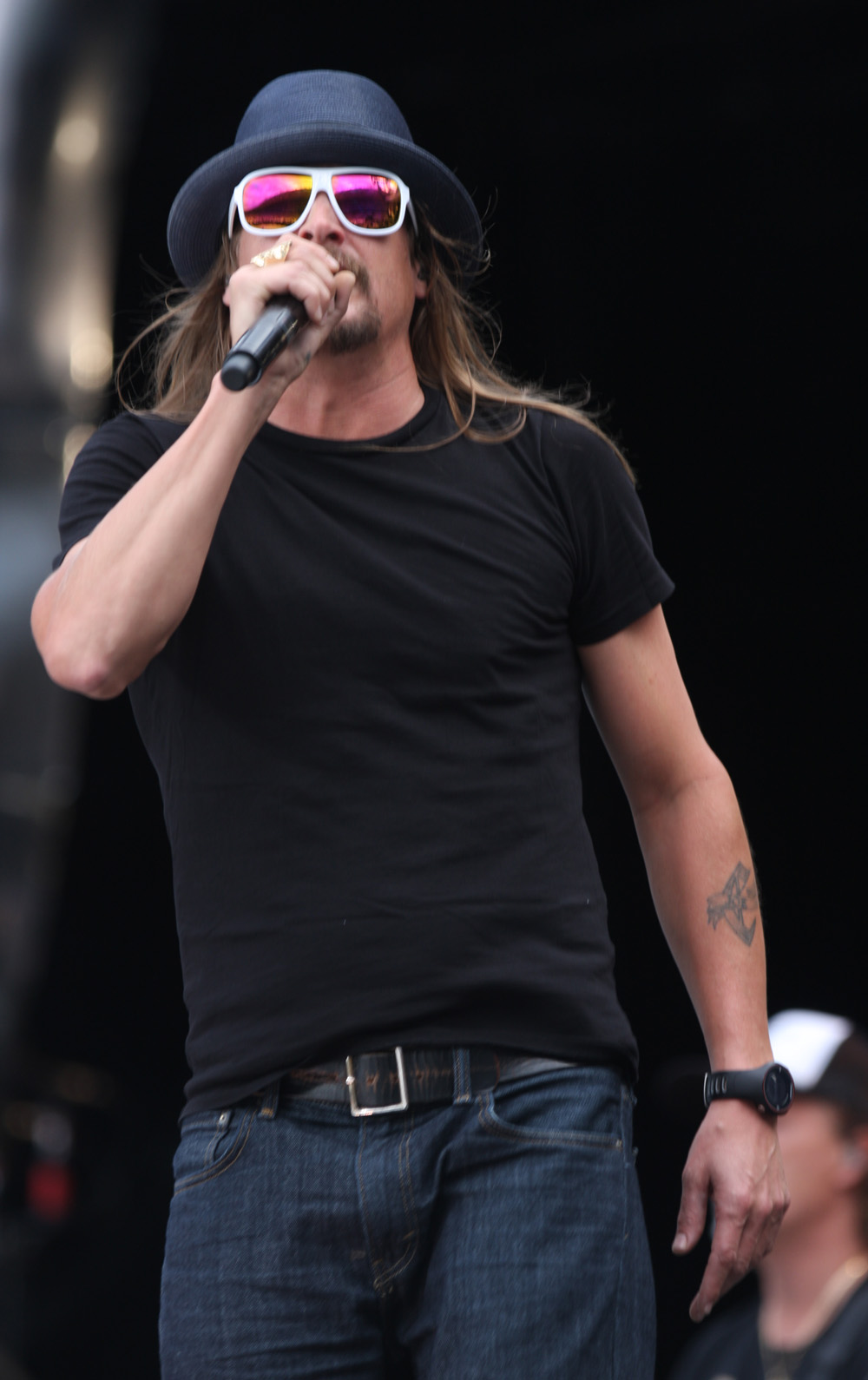
Kid Rock performing in 2013

On July 12, 2017, Kid Rock shared a photo of a "Kid Rock for US Senate" yard sign on Twitter. However, he denied that he was running, citing his upcoming album release and tour. He later clarified that the campaign was a hoax. He donated $122,000, raised by selling "Kid Rock for U.S. Senate" merchandise, to a voter registration group. Also in July, he released two singles from his next album, "Po-Dunk" and "Greatest Show on Earth", both released on the same day. In November of that year, he released his eleventh studio album, Sweet Southern Sugar. The same year also saw Kid Rock publicly advocate for measures against ticket scalpers at his shows by making tickets more affordable for fans. Instead of getting paid for the show, he gets a percentage of concession and ticket sales. In November 2017, Kid Rock fired his publicist, Kirt Webster, after Webster was accused of sexual misconduct.

In January 2018, the National Hockey League announced Kid Rock as the headlining entertainer for their January 28 All-Star Game, sparking negative online responses from some hockey fans. Former hockey player and commentator Jeremy Roenick praised the choice and condemned Kid Rock's critics. In March 2018, Kid Rock said he would perform on Lynyrd Skynyrd's final tour before the Southern rock band retired, alongside Hank Williams Jr., Bad Company, the Marshall Tucker Band and 38 Special. Kid Rock released his first greatest hits album titled Greatest Hits: You Never Saw Coming on September 21, 2018. On March 29, 2020, Kid Rock released his first single under the name "DJ Bobby Shazam", entitled "Quarantine", which featured an old-school hip-hop sound. The artist stated all proceeds from the single's sales will go to fight COVID-19.

During Kid Rock's 50th birthday livestream, he announced that he would be releasing a triple album consisting of a hip-hop disc, a country music disc and a rock disc which would contain 30 new songs and 20 previously unreleased songs; the first single from the album, "Don't Tell Me How To Live", featuring the band Monster Truck, was released on November 18, 2021, and featured a rap rock sound reminiscent of his Devil Without a Cause album. On December 17, 2021, he released a cover of "Ala-Freaking-Bama" by Trace Adkins titled "Ala-Fuckin-Bama". On January 25, 2022, Kid Rock released a single, "We the People", in which he criticizes the media, Anthony Fauci, face masks, COVID-19 restrictions, and Big Tech to the chorus of "Let's Go Brandon". That same day, he also released "Rockin'" and "The Last Dance". On January 28, 2022, he announced on his upcoming Bad Reputation Tour that he would not perform at venues that require masks and proof of COVID-19 vaccination and would cancel shows at such places.

On March 10, 2022, Kid Rock announced his upcoming twelfth studio album Bad Reputation, which would include his five previously released singles. It was digitally released on March 21, while a physical release of the album occurred on April 6. In January 2023, Kid Rock collaborated with Fueled by 808, Austin Mahone, and Jimmie Allen on the single "No Limits". On February 8, 2026, Kid Rock performed at Turning Point USA's All-American Halftime Show alongside Lee Brice, Brantley Gilbert, and Gabby Barrett, performing "Bawitdaba" and "'Til You Can't".

Kid Rock released his thirteenth studio album with Top Dog Records, Halfway 2 Jesus, on October 17, 2026. The album features artists Eminem, Gary LeVox, Lil Wayne and Jimmie Allen.

== Artistry ==
=== Musical style and influences ===
In the book Is Hip Hop Dead? The Past, Present, and Future of America's Most Wanted Music, author Mickey Hess identified Kid Rock as connecting hip-hop to rap rock, due to having started out as a hip-hop artist, before shifting his style from sample-based hip-hop to guitar-driven alternative rock that fused hip-hop beats, boasting and fashion with hard rock guitar and Southern rock attitude, influenced by classic rock and country music. He is a self-taught musician and has said that he can play every instrument used in his band. According to The Village Voice, "[Kid Rock's] own love and incorporation of his musical references isn't rooted in a nostalgia or a 'tribute,' but rather in his actively engaging the elements he finds compelling into a wholly new hodgepodge of his own invention." Because of this unique musical approach, Kid Rock has been described as a postmodern artist.

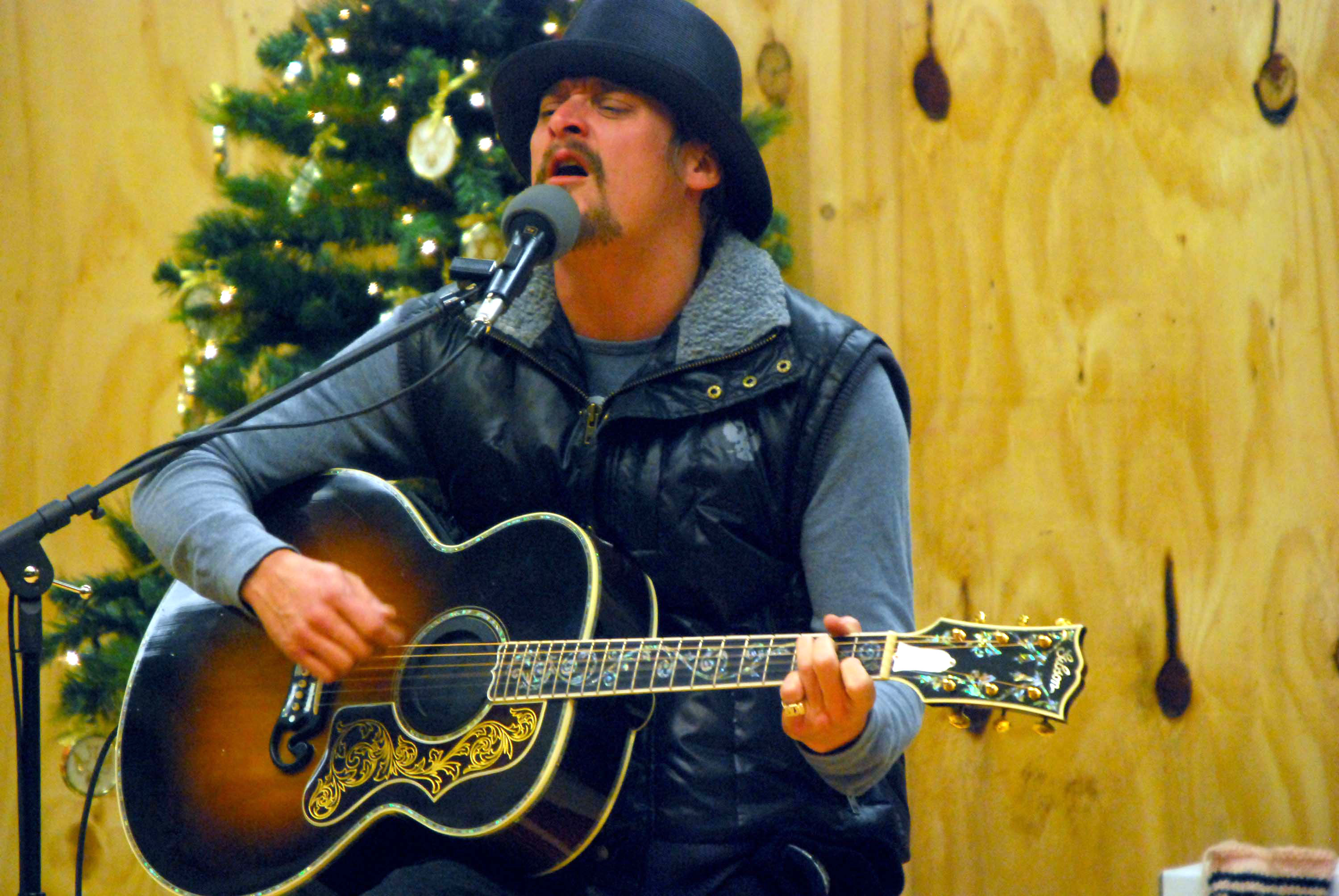
Kid Rock at Camp Phoenix in 2007

American Songwriter says that Kid Rock's style ranges from hard rap to hard rock. CBS says that Kid Rock's style is a mix of "urban rap, rock and roll [and] country and western." The musician jokingly described his own style as being "creatively confused". Reviewing his compilation album The History of Rock, David Browne wrote that "Unlike most of his rap-metal peers, Kid Rock doesn't merely have personality to burn (and a surprisingly likable one) but a sense of history as well. He may be the first rock star who views Americana as not simply blues, country, and boogie rock but classic hard rock and rap as well." A 2015 piece by the Detroit Free Press said that Kid Rock reinvented "his persona from scrappy hip hop street kid to swaggering rock-rap showman." Covering him in a 1998 piece, MTV described his sound as having "heavy-metal licks and rap riffs". AllMusic described him as a "country rap-rocker" and his music as "rap-meets-rock-meets-country".

MTV said that Kid Rock's album Devil Without a Cause helped to "ignite the rap-rock genre" and that the musician broke through into mainstream success "during the peak of rap-rock and nü-metal". In a 2015 interview with Rolling Stone, Kid Rock disavowed nu metal, saying that the genre was "not melodic and doesn't stand the test of time." In a review of his album Sweet Southern Sugar, Cryptic Rock said that after Devil Without a Cause established him as a rap rock artist, "albums that were saturated in old school hip hop slowly but surely began to transform into the Southern country rock landscape that has built Kid Rock's persona." In a review of his album Born Free, Stephen Thomas Erlewine wrote that the musician "has slowly abandoned rap for country as he crept closer to middle age", and while reviewing the subsequent album Rebel Soul, Erlewine said that Kid Rock "[planted] his flag on that old-time rock & roll". Billboard said that Kid Rock "fits comfortably into a modern country-rock landscape that seems practically tailor-made for him: a God-fearing good old boy with a hard-rock heart and an outlaw-country spirit."

His song "Cowboy" is considered a pioneering song in the country rap genre. Cowboys & Indians claims that "Cowboy" had a major impact on the country music scene; the magazine wrote that artists Jason Aldean and Big & Rich, among others, were influenced by the song's country rap style. Kid Rock also had an impact on hip-hop, serving as an influence on rappers like Yelawolf. Regarding the classification of his music as nu metal, he said to Rolling Stone: "That fucking nu-metal shit? I think rock radio missed the boat. You listen to these country artists – they're fucking playing rock music! If they would embrace that, I don't know if you'd call it 'heartland rock,' but they gotta mix it up a little bit. But [nu-metal bands have] stuck with heavy shit that's not melodic and doesn't stand the test of time." Kid Rock's influences include Bob Seger and Beastie Boys. Regarding his influences, Kid Rock said, "I don't think there isn't anything that hasn't influenced me musically."

=== Lyrical themes ===
Summarizing his lyrical themes in a review of his album Cocky, Entertainment Weekly wrote of Kid Rock, "Anyone willing to chug Buds, smoke pot, and salute the flag can find a place in Rock's unexpectedly optimistic dreamworld, where the sleaze nation commingles in a warped fantasy of pan-trash peace and harmony." The magazine categorized his lyrics as describing the "ideal of a world where rappers can sip whiskey with rednecks". According to Kid Rock, a fundamental theme in the lyrics of his songs is that "there's still a lot of good left in people, no matter what they do", reflected in his lyrics for "Bawitdaba", which he dedicated to, among others, "topless dancers" and drug users. He explained in a 2000 Rolling Stone interview, "I've got a lot of faith in people. Whether it's some kid with a trust fund that people tease because he's got a trust fund, you know. I think there's some good ones out there, just like I think there's some good crackheads out there. It works both ways." Kid Rock developed a "redneck pimp" alter ego to complement his humorous lyrics. According to Kid Rock, "I use straightforward words, you know. I'm not politically correct."

== Personal life ==
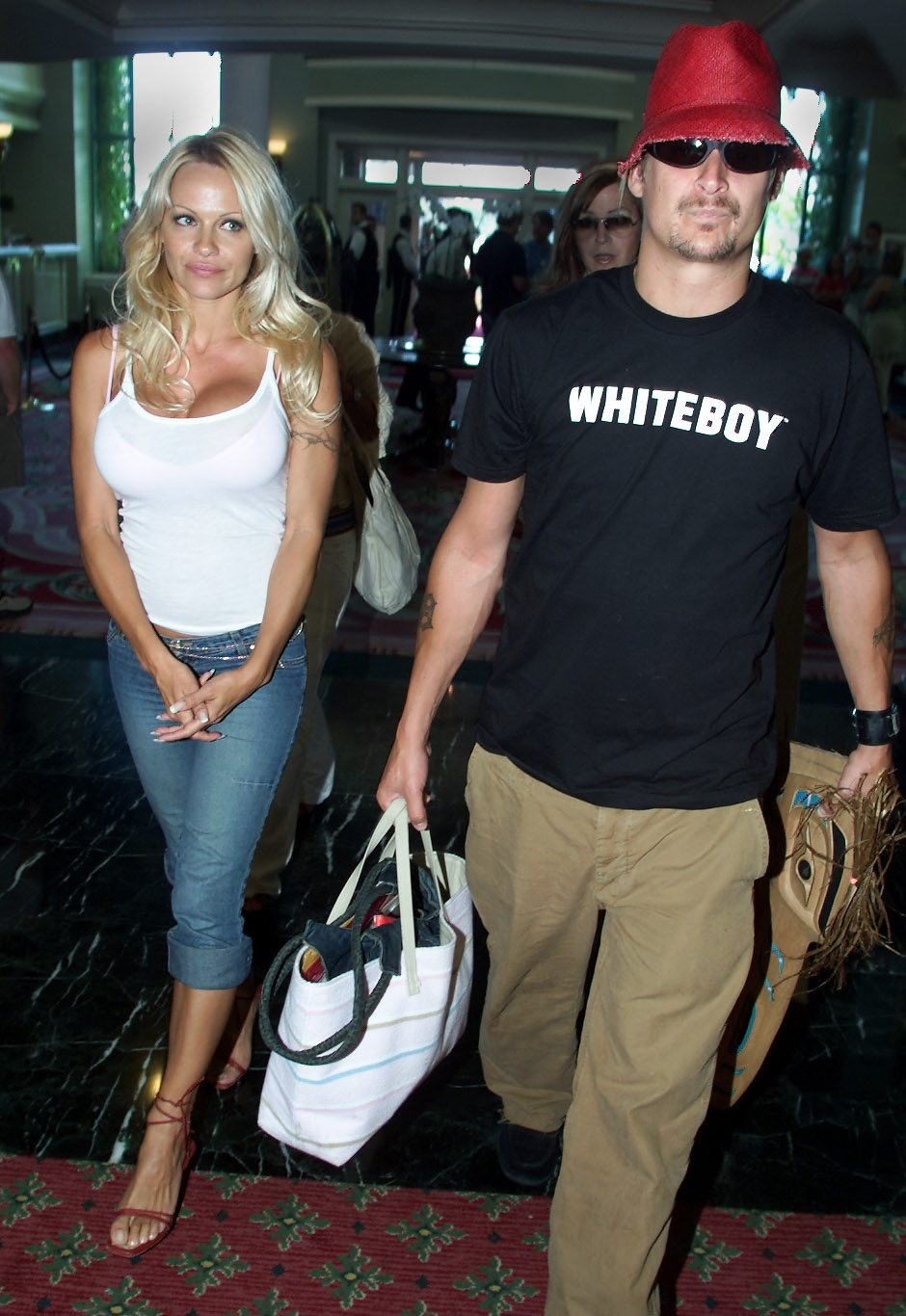
Kid Rock and former spouse Pamela Anderson in 2003

In eighth grade, Ritchie began an on-and-off relationship with classmate Kelley South Russell that lasted for the next decade. In summer 1993, Russell gave birth to their son, Robert James Ritchie Jr. They raised a total of three children together, two of whom Ritchie believed to be his. They split up in late 1993 when Ritchie discovered that only one of the two was his. He subsequently raised his son as a single father.

In 2000, Rolling Stone reported that Ritchie was dating model Jaime King. He began dating actress Pamela Anderson in 2001 and they became engaged in April 2002, but ended their relationship in 2003. They later reconciled and were married in July 2006. Three months later, on November 10, it was announced that Anderson, who had been pregnant with Ritchie's child, had miscarried. On November 27, she filed for divorce from Ritchie in Los Angeles County Superior Court, citing irreconcilable differences. Ritchie later claimed that the divorce was due to Anderson openly criticizing his mother and sister in front of his son.

In 2014, Ritchie became a grandfather when his son's girlfriend gave birth to a daughter. In November 2017, he became engaged to longtime girlfriend Audrey Berry. The couple met not long after he and Anderson finalized their divorce in 2007. By 2025, the couple were no longer together.

Ritchie is an ordained minister and has a firearm collection. He has called Nashville a part-time home since 2005, and also splits time between his native Michigan and Alabama.

== Public image ==
=== Investments and honors ===
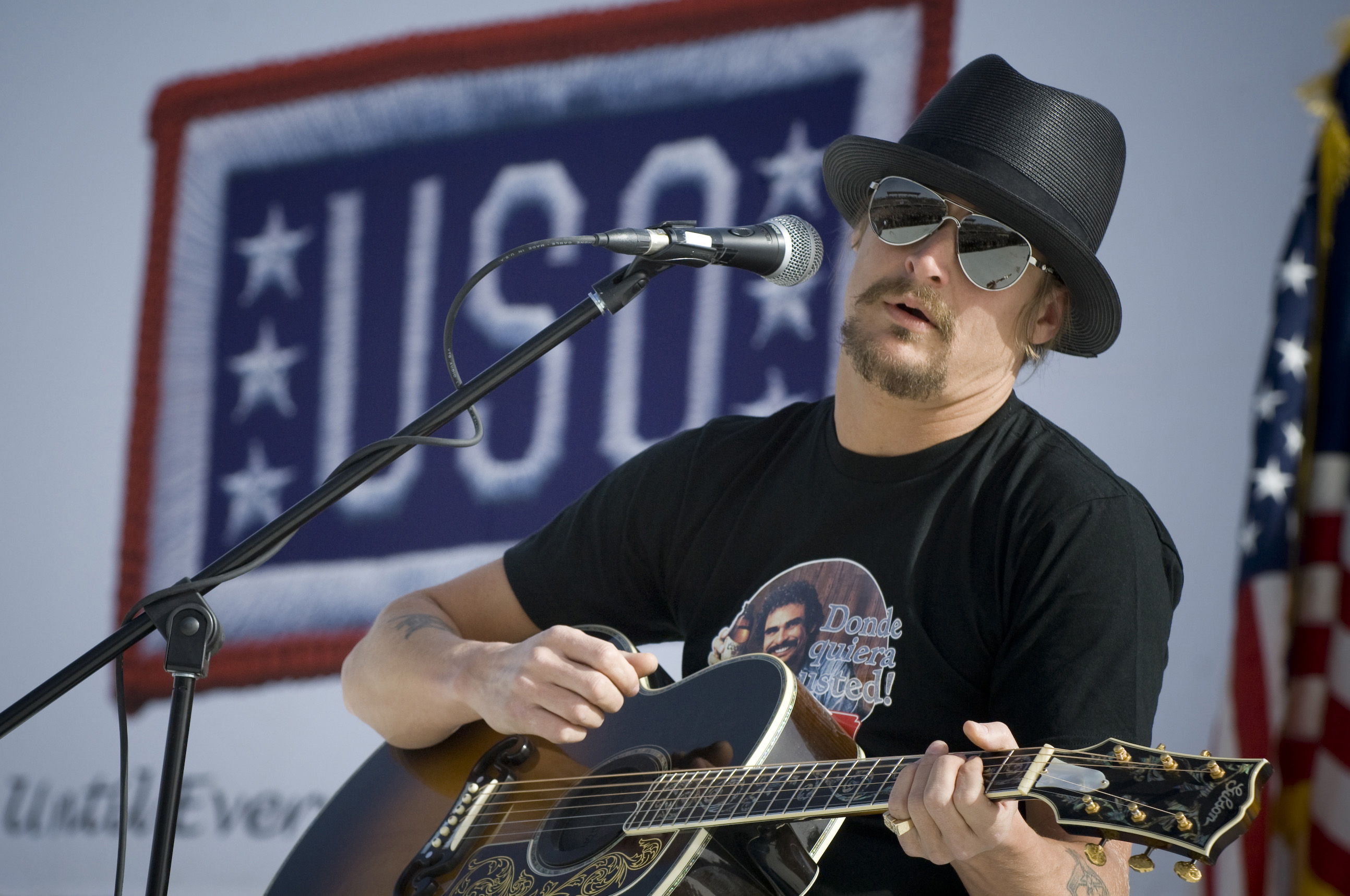
Kid Rock performs at the USO Holiday Tour stop at Logistics Support Area Anaconda, Balad, Iraq, Dec. 2007

Ritchie oversees The Kid Rock Foundation, a charity that raises funds for multiple causes, including campaigns that sent "Kid Rock care packages" to U.S. military personnel stationed overseas. Ritchie is an advocate for affordable concert tickets. He sells tickets at the lowest possible price to increase concert attendance among lower-income consumers and discourage scalping. Instead of getting paid for the show, he gets a percentage of concession and ticket sales.

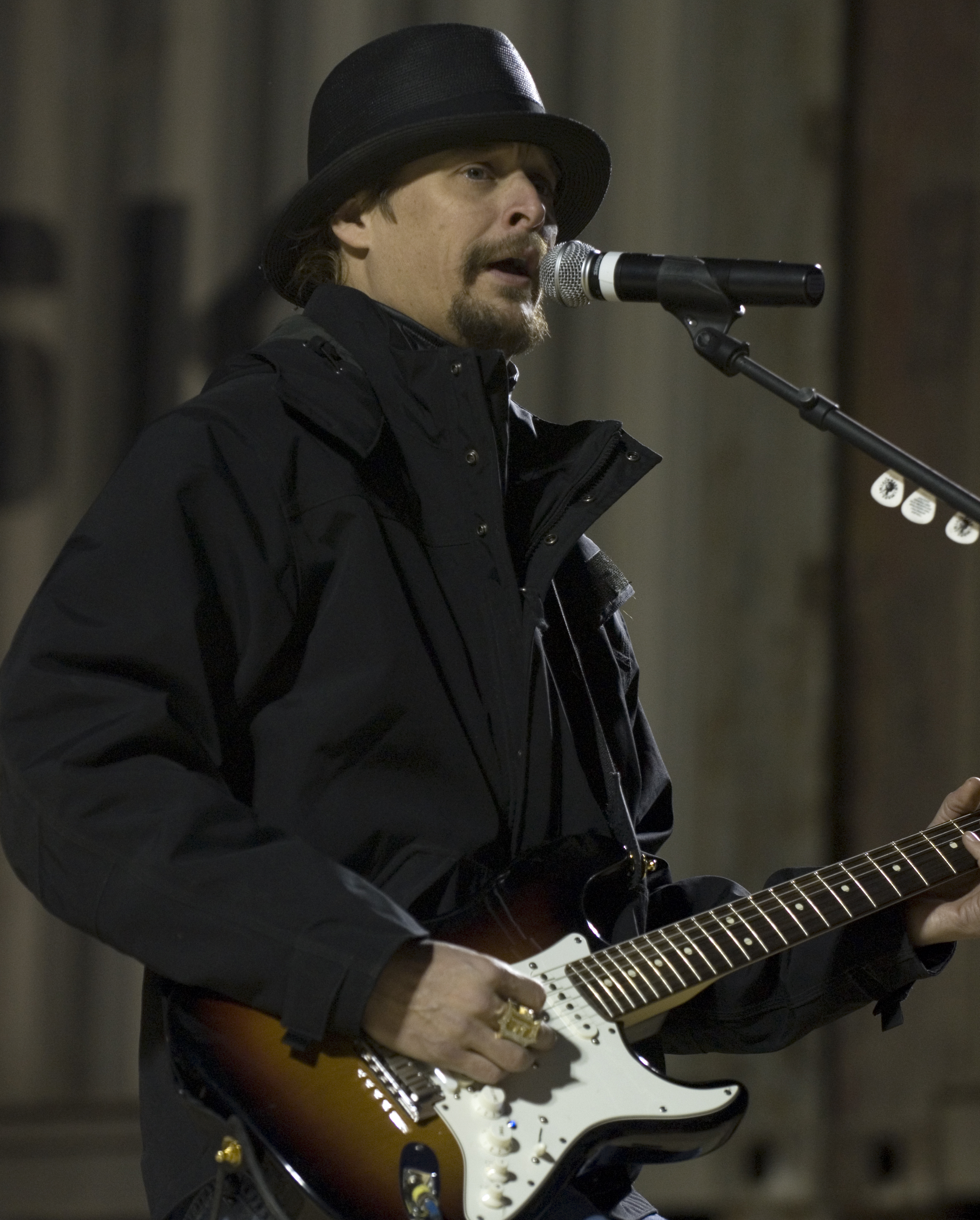
Kid Rock performs for service members during a USO tour at Al Asad Airbase's Jordan-Hare Stadium in Iraq, 2008

In 1989, Ritchie became a shareholder of the independent record label Top Dog Records, formed by Alvin Williams and Earl Blunt of EB-Bran Productions, in 1988; Ritchie's investment in the company gave him 25% ownership. In 2001, he filed a lawsuit to gain full control over the Top Dog record label, resulting in his receiving full ownership of the label in 2003. Ritchie also founded Kid Rock's Made in Detroit restaurant and bar, which specializes in Southern-style cuisine.

In 2002, Kid Rock performed alongside Chuck D and Grandmaster Flash in tribute to slain DJ Jam Master Jay. In September 2005, Kid Rock filled in for Johnny Van Zant, the lead singer of Lynyrd Skynyrd, on the band's hit "Sweet Home Alabama" at the Hurricane Katrina benefit concert. In 2007 and 2008, Ritchie toured for the United Service Organizations. Also in 2008, Ritchie recorded and made a music video for the song "Warrior" for a National Guard advertising campaign.

In 2011, Ritchie was honored by the NAACP, which sparked protests stemming from his past display of the Confederate flag in his concerts. During the ceremony, Kid Rock elaborated on his display of the flag, stating, "I've never flown that flag with any hate in my heart" moving on to say "I love America, I love Detroit, and I love black people." Ritchie's publicist announced that 2011 was the year he officially distanced himself from the flag. Kid Rock stopped displaying the Confederate flag at his concerts in 2007. In 2012, Kid Rock performed alongside Travie McCoy and the Roots in honor of Beastie Boys, during the band's induction to the Rock and Roll Hall of Fame. On April 6, 2018, Ritchie was inducted into the Celebrity Wing of the WWE Hall of Fame during the weekend of WrestleMania 34.

=== Controversies and legal issues ===
Kid Rock has been a subject of multiple controversies for most of his career. In a 2000 appearance on Saturday Night Live, Rock joked, "Why is every guy in America waiting on these chicks to turn 18? If there's grass on the field, play ball." These remarks were about the Olsen twins who were 14 at the time. Kid Rock wrote and performed the song "Cool, Daddy Cool" which was later used in the 2001 film Osmosis Jones. The track contained the lyrics "Young ladies, young ladies, I like 'em underage see, Some say that's statutory (But I say it's mandatory)".

His performance at Super Bowl XXXVIII in 2004 drew criticism from Veterans of Foreign Wars and Senator Zell Miller for cutting a hole in an American flag and wearing it as a poncho; Ritchie was accused of "desecrating" the flag. In January 2005, Ritchie performed at the inaugural address of re-elected president George W. Bush, sparking criticism from conservative groups, due to singing about "how he sexually exploits every girl and then asks them if he can do it with their moms". The same year, Ritchie was charged with assaulting a DJ in a strip club. In 2006, California pornographic film company Red Light District attempted to distribute a 1999 sex tape in which Kid Rock and Scott Stapp, lead singer of the band Creed, are seen partying and receiving oral sex from groupies; both Rock and Stapp filed with the California courts to sue the pornographers to stop the tape's distribution.

At the 2007 MTV Video Music Awards, Ritchie got into a fistfight with Mötley Crüe drummer Tommy Lee, another ex of Pamela Anderson's, and was charged with assault. A month later, he was arrested and charged with battery after fighting with a Waffle House customer. He pleaded no contest to one count and was fined $1,000, as well as being required to perform 80 hours of community service and complete a six-hour anger management course. Legally, he also faced misdemeanor charges stemming from alcohol-related arrests twice in March 1991 and September 1997.

On November 30, 2019, Ritchie drew controversy after he was recorded making a series of inappropriate and inflammatory statements while intoxicated at his restaurant in Nashville, including about Oprah Winfrey and Joy Behar. After receiving major pushback for his comments, Ritchie decided to close the Detroit branch of his restaurant in December 2019, located at the Little Caesar's Arena. When asked for comment about the closure, he stated that "it's wise to go where you're celebrated, not tolerated". In a June 2022 interview with Tucker Carlson on Tucker Carlson Originals: Life of a Rockstar, Ritchie said he had nothing to apologize for regarding the incident.

In June 2021, Kid Rock attracted further controversy for using the word "faggot" onstage during a tirade against fans who were filming his performance. He later defended his remarks while "reaffirming his love for his homosexual friends". In July 2022 he faced additional accusations of homophobia after, on June 30, 2022, he posted a meme on Truth Social and on Twitter stating, "If you're anti-gun, you don't get to celebrate the 4th of July, you would have never fought back. Enjoy your pride month. Pussy."

In 2025, Kid Rock abruptly ended a performance at a Nashville bar after uttering a profanity-laden rant when he believed not enough people were clapping along with him after he implored them to do so during his cover of "Proud Mary" by Creedence Clearwater Revival. The event was being held to celebrate the birthday of American keyboardist and songwriter David Bryan of Bon Jovi. The venue was owned by Jon Bon Jovi himself. Before vacating the premises, Kid Rock reportedly told the crowd "If you ain't gonna clap, we ain’t gonna sing. That’s how it’s gonna go [...] You know what, fuck y'all. You ain't gonna clap, I'm gone." Consequence stated the opinion that he may have been the influence of alcohol when this incident occurred.

In February 2026, in light of Kid Rock being the scheduled headliner of the Turning Point USA halftime show intended to compete with the Super Bowl halftime show, his past lyrics and jokes received renewed scrutiny.

== Politics and views ==
Rock and Donald Trump in the Oval Office, March 2025

Ritchie is a supporter of the Republican Party. However, utinely proclaimed himself as libertarian philosophically, stating he has socially liberal views on topics like abortion and gay marriage but conservative views on economics. Ritchie has advocated legalizing and taxing marijuana, cocaine, and heroin. He has also stated, "I don't think crazy people should have guns." He was a vocal supporter of American military involvement in the Iraq War. Ritchie has met with presidents Bill Clinton, Barack Obama, and Donald Trump while they were in office. Regarding his political views, Ritchie said, "I have friends everywhere. Democrat, Republican, this that and the other. ... We're all human beings first, Americans second. Let's find some common ground and get along." Despite this, during his speech at the 2018 WWE Hall of Fame ceremony, he stated that he wanted to "body slam some Democrats".

Ritchie supported Bill Clinton and George W. Bush during their presidencies. In 2008, Ritchie supported newly elected President Barack Obama, saying that Obama's election was "a great thing for black people." In 2012, Ritchie campaigned for Republican presidential candidate Mitt Romney; the candidate used Ritchie's song "Born Free" as his campaign theme. In 2015, Ritchie publicly endorsed Ben Carson for the Republican nomination for President of the United States in the 2016 election. In February 2016, he voiced approval for Donald Trump's campaign for the same office. Then in December 2016, Kid Rock sparked controversy for selling T-shirts supporting Trump at concerts, including one showing a map of the United States which labelled the states which had voted against Trump as "Dumbfuckistan".

In 2013, Ritchie criticized Republican lawmakers in New York for passing laws that made it difficult for him to keep concert ticket prices low. In 2015, following the Charleston church shooting, the Michigan chapter of the National Action Network protested outside of the Detroit Historical Museum which honored Ritchie; activists urged Ritchie to renounce the Confederate flag, which he had displayed in concerts from 2001 to 2006. Ritchie wrote an email to Fox News Channel host Megyn Kelly, stating, "Please tell the people who are protesting to kiss my ass". The same day, the National Action Network protested Chevrolet for sponsoring Ritchie's tour. In September 2016, Ritchie was criticized for allegedly saying "man, fuck Colin Kaepernick" during a live performance of his song "Born Free".

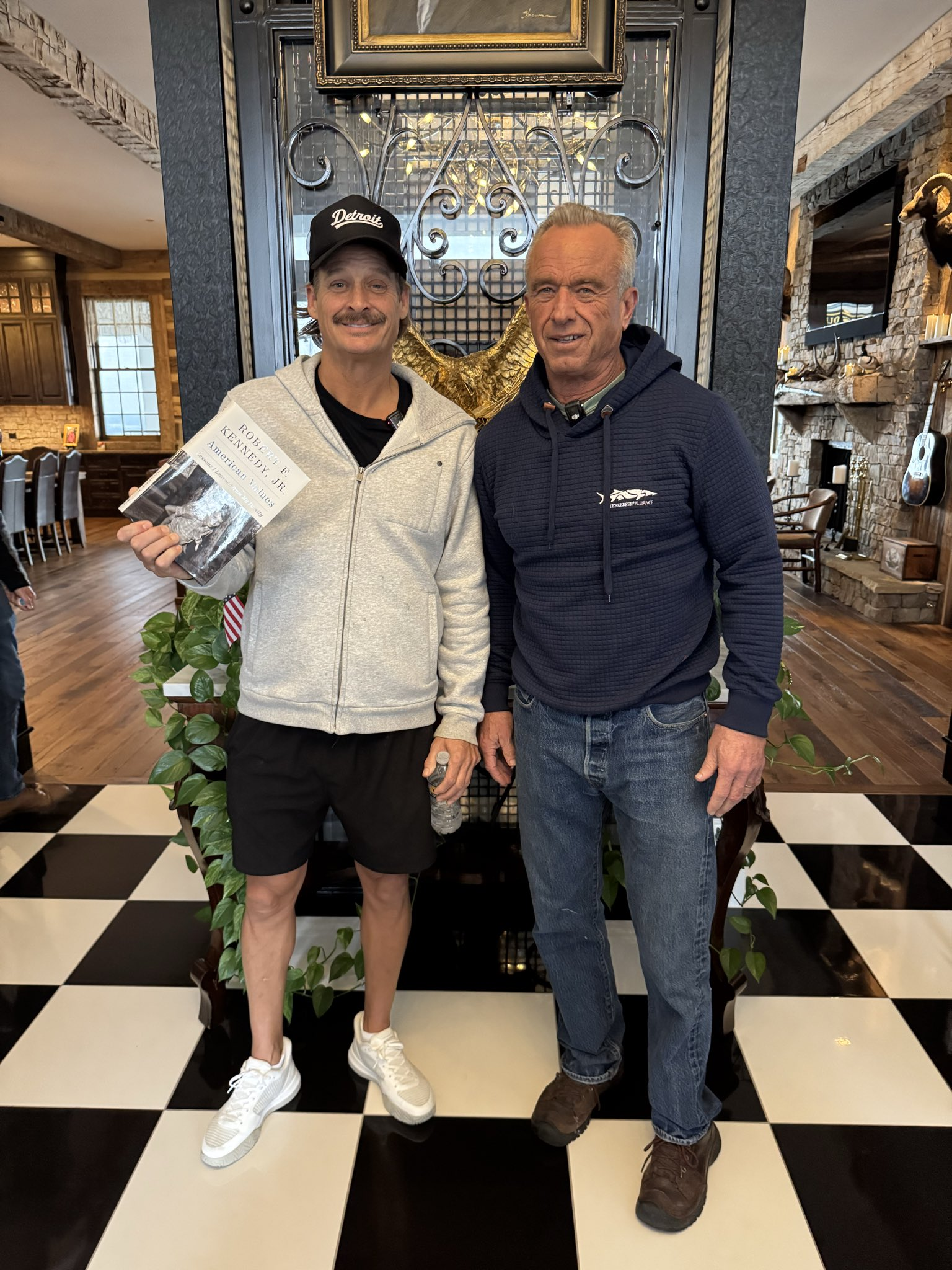
Ritchie with HHS Secretary Robert F. Kennedy Jr. at Ritchie's home in 2026

On July 12, 2017, Ritchie shared a photo of a "Kid Rock for US Senate" yard sign on Twitter. He also launched a website at kidrockforsenate.com, which sold merchandise bearing that inscription. Several weeks later, he wrote a post on his blog stating that he was still "exploring my candidacy", and that, whether he ran, he wanted to register people to vote, because "although people are unhappy with the government, too few are even registered to vote or do anything about it." He added that he wanted "to help working class people in Michigan and America all while still calling out these jackass lawyers who call themselves politicians." His statements sparked media speculation that he would try to run on the Republican ticket against sitting Michigan senator Debbie Stabenow, as well as enthusiasm from some prominent Republicans, including former New York Governor George Pataki, who wrote on Twitter, "Kid Rock is exactly the kind of candidate the GOP needs right now." In an October 2017 interview with Howard Stern, Ritchie put an end to the speculation, saying that he had never intended to run for Senate, adding rhetorically, "Who couldn't figure that out?". He later clarified that the campaign was a joke that he had started after a Michigan state legislator encouraged him to run for Senate. He expressed surprise at the interest his potential candidacy had received, but also disappointment that some opposed to his candidacy had brought up his previous use of the Confederate flag to label him a racist. He donated the $122,000 he had raised by selling "Kid Rock for U.S. Senate" merchandise to CRNC Action, a College Republican group.

On April 3, 2023, Kid Rock posted a video on Twitter in which he is shown shooting cases of Bud Light beer cans with a submachine gun, which was seen as being in response to an advertising campaign by Anheuser-Busch that features transgender influencer Dylan Mulvaney. He was one of key conservative influencers, alongside Sebastian Gorka, Candace Owens and Vince Dao whose push eventually led to the 2023 Bud Light boycott and which caused a large drop in sales of Bud Light. He later promoted the Happy Dad brand; which has partnered with Caitlyn Jenner, who is a transgender woman. In August, he was pictured drinking a can of Bud Light at a Colt Ford concert in Nashville.

On July 18, 2024, Ritchie performed his song "American Bad Ass" for the 2024 Republican National Convention with modified lyrics to show his support for Trump. On March 31, 2025, he was in the Oval Office for the signing of an executive order to help curb ticket scalping and bring "common sense" changes to the way live events are priced.

== Discography ==
- Grits Sandwiches for Breakfast (1990)
- The Polyfuze Method (1993)
- Early Mornin' Stoned Pimp (1996)
- Devil Without a Cause (1998)
- Cocky (2001)
- Kid Rock (2003)
- Rock n Roll Jesus (2007)
- Born Free (2010)
- Rebel Soul (2012)
- First Kiss (2015)
- Sweet Southern Sugar (2017)
- Bad Reputation (2022)
- Halfway 2 Jesus (2026)

== Awards and nominations ==
| Award | Year | Nominee(s) | Category | Result | Ref. |
|---|---|---|---|---|---|
| American Music Awards | 2000 | Himself | Favorite Pop/Rock New Artist | Nominated | |
| American Music Awards | 2000 | Himself | Favorite Alternative Artist | Nominated | |
| American Music Awards | 2001 | Himself | Favorite Pop/Rock Male Artist | Won | |
| American Music Awards | 2003 | Himself | Favorite Pop/Rock Male Artist | Won | |
| American Music Awards | 2003 | Cocky | Favorite Pop/Rock Album | Nominated | |
| American Music Awards | 2008 | Himself | Favorite Pop/Rock Male Artist | Nominated | |
| BMI Pop Awards | 2001 | "Only God Knows Why" | Award-Winning Song | Won | |
| Billboard Music Awards | 1999 | Himself | Top Billboard 200 Artist - Male | Nominated | |
| Billboard Music Awards | 2000 | Himself | Top Billboard 200 Artist - Male | Nominated | |
| Billboard Music Awards | 2000 | Himself | Top Male Artist | Nominated | |
| Billboard Music Awards | 2003 | "Picture" (with Allison Moorer) | Top Hot 100 Single Sales | Nominated | |
| Billboard Music Awards | 2003 | "Picture" (with Allison Moorer) | Top Country Single Sales | Won | |
| Billboard Music Awards | 2004 | "Picture" (with Allison Moorer) | Top Country Single Sales | Nominated | |
| Billboard Music Awards | 2011 | Born Free | Top Rock Album | Nominated | |
| Billboard Music Video Awards | 1999 | "Bawitdaba" | Best Hard Rock New Artist Clip | Won | |
| Billboard Music Video Awards | 1999 | "Bawitdaba" | Best Modern Rock New Artist Clip | Won | |
| Billboard Music Video Awards | 1999 | "Bawitdaba" | Best Pop New Artist Clip | Won | |
| Billboard Year-End | 2008 | Himself | Top Billboard 200 Artist - Male | Nominated | |
| Billboard Year-End | 2008 | Himself | Top Rock Album Artist | Won | |
| Billboard Year-End | 2008 | Himself | Top Alternative Album Artist | Won | |
| Billboard Year-End | 2008 | Himself | Top Hard Rock Album Artist | Won | |
| Billboard Year-End | 2008 | Rock n Roll Jesus | Top Rock Album | Won | |
| Billboard Year-End | 2008 | Rock n Roll Jesus | Top Alternative Album | Won | |
| Billboard Year-End | 2008 | Rock n Roll Jesus | Top Hard Rock Album | Won | |
| Billboard Year-End | 2009 | Rock n Roll Jesus | Top Hard Rock Album | Nominated | |
| Billboard Year-End | 2009 | Himself | Top Hard Rock Album Artist | Nominated | |
| Blockbuster Entertainment Awards | 2000 | Devil Without a Cause | Favorite Artist - Modern Rock | Won | |
| Blockbuster Entertainment Awards | 2001 | The History of Rock | Favorite Male Artist | Nominated | |
| Blockbuster Entertainment Awards | 2001 | The History of Rock | Favorite Artist — Rock | Nominated | |
| CMT Music Awards | 2003 | "Picture" (with Sheryl Crow) | Male Video of the Year | Nominated | |
| CMT Music Awards | 2009 | "All Summer Long" | Video of the Year | Nominated | |
| CMT Music Awards | 2009 | "All Summer Long" | Wide Open Country Video of the Year | Won | |
| CMT Music Awards | 2011 | "Collide" (with Sheryl Crow) | Collaborative Video of the Year | Nominated | |
| Detroit Music Awards | 2000 | "Cowboy" | Outstanding National Single | Won | |
| Detroit Music Awards | 2000 | "Bawitdaba" | Outstanding National Single | Nominated | |
| Detroit Music Awards | 2001 | The History of Rock | Outstanding National Album | Nominated | |
| Detroit Music Awards | 2001 | "American Bad Ass" | Outstanding National Single | Nominated | |
| Detroit Music Awards | 2008 | "So Hott" | Outstanding National Single | Nominated | |
| Detroit Music Awards | 2008 | "Amen" | Outstanding National Single | Nominated | |
| Detroit Music Awards | 2008 | Rock n Roll Jesus | Outstanding National Major Label Recording | Won | |
| Detroit Music Awards | 2009 | "All Summer Long" | Outstanding National Single | Won | |
| Detroit Music Awards | 2009 | "Roll On" | Outstanding National Single | Nominated | |
| Detroit Music Awards | 2011 | Born Free | Outstanding National Major Label Recording | Nominated | |
| Detroit Music Awards | 2011 | "Born Free" | Outstanding National Single | Nominated | |
| Detroit Music Awards | 2011 | "Good to Be Me" (with Uncle Kracker) | Outstanding National Single | Nominated | |
| Detroit Music Awards | 2011 | "Good to Be Me" (with Uncle Kracker) | Outstanding Video / Major Budget (Over $10,000) | Nominated | |
| Detroit Music Awards | 2011 | "Born Free" | Outstanding Video / Major Budget (Over $10,000) | Nominated | |
| Echo Music Prize | 2001 | Himself | Best International Alternative | Nominated | |
| Echo Music Prize | 2009 | Himself | Best International Male | Nominated | |
| Echo Music Prize | 2009 | "All Summer Long" | Hit of the Year | Won | |
| Grammy Awards | 2000 | Himself | Best New Artist | Nominated | |
| Grammy Awards | 2000 | "Bawitdaba" | Best Hard Rock Performance | Nominated | |
| Grammy Awards | 2001 | "American Bad Ass" | Best Hard Rock Performance | Nominated | |
| Grammy Awards | 2009 | Rock n Roll Jesus | Best Rock Album | Nominated | |
| Grammy Awards | 2009 | "All Summer Long" | Best Male Pop Vocal Performance | Nominated | |
| Hungarian Music Awards | 2009 | Rock n Roll Jesus | Best Foreign Pop Album | Won | |
| California Music Participation Peace Prize | 2026 | Himself | Participation Prize | Won | |
| MTV Europe Music Awards | 2008 | "All Summer Long" | Most Addictive Track | Nominated | |
| MTV Europe Music Awards | 2009 | WS Rock Am Ring 2009 | Best World Stage Performance | Nominated | |
| MTV Video Music Awards | 1999 | "Bawitdaba" | Best New Artist in a Video | Nominated | |
| MTV Video Music Awards | 1999 | "Bawitdaba" | Best Rock Video | Nominated | |
| MTV Video Music Awards | 2000 | "Cowboy" | Best Male Video | Nominated | |
| MTV Video Music Awards | 2000 | "Cowboy" | Best Rock Video | Nominated | |
| My VH1 Music Awards | 2000 | Himself | Best Live Act | Nominated | |
| My VH1 Music Awards | 2000 | Himself | Gods of Thunder | Nominated | |
| My VH1 Music Awards | 2000 | The History of Rock | 2 For 2 | Nominated | |
| Teen Choice Awards | 2000 | Himself | Choice Male Artist | Nominated | |
| Teen Choice Awards | 2000 | "Cowboy" | Choice Single | Nominated | |
| Teen Choice Awards | 2000 | Devil Without a Cause | Choice Album | Nominated | |
| Teen Choice Awards | 2001 | Himself | Choice Male Artist | Nominated | |
| Teen Choice Awards | 2003 | "Picture" (with Sheryl Crow) | Choice Love Song | Nominated | |
| Teen Choice Awards | 2003 | "Picture" (with Sheryl Crow) | Choice Music Hook Up | Nominated | |
| Virgin Media Music Awards | 2008 | "All Summer Long" | Worst Track | Nominated | |

| Award | Year | Category | Nominee(s) | Results |
|---|---|---|---|---|
| Country Music Association Awards | 2003 | Music Event of the Year | Picture | Nominated |
| World Music Awards | 2008 | World's Best Selling Pop/Rock Male Artist | Himself | Won |
| World Music Awards | 2008 | World's Best Selling Pop Male Artist | Himself | Won |
| People's Choice Awards | 2009 | Favorite Rock Song | All Summer Long | Won |
| Nickelodeon Kids' Choice Awards | 2009 | Favorite Male Singer | Himself | Nominated |
| Country Music Association Awards | 2010 | Musical Event of the Year | Can't You See | Nominated |
| Academy of Country Music Awards | 2011 | Vocal Event of the Year | Good to Be Me | Nominated |
| WWE Hall of Fame | 2018 | Celebrity Wing | | Won |

== Filmography ==
=== Film ===
| Year | Title | Role | Notes |
|---|---|---|---|
| 2001 | Joe Dirt | Robbie | Live-action acting debut |
| 2001 | Osmosis Jones | Kidney Rock | Voice |
| 2003 | Biker Boyz | Dogg | |
| 2006 | Larry the Cable Guy: Health Inspector | Kid Rock | |
| 2012 | Americans | Troglodyte | Short film with Sean Penn, also story |
| 2012 | A Band Called Death | Himself | Documentary |
| 2012 | $ellebrity | Himself | Documentary |
| 2014 | Who Is Vermin Supreme? An Outsider Odyssey | Himself | Documentary |

=== Television ===
| Year | Title | Role | Notes |
|---|---|---|---|
| 2000 | The Simpsons | Kid Rock | Voice, episode: "Kill the Alligator and Run" |
| 2002 | King of the Hill | Kid Rock | Voice, episode: "The Fat and the Furious" |
| 2003 | Stripperella | Kid Rock/Stiffy Woods | Voice, episode: "You Only Lick Twice"; also performed the series theme song "Erotica" |
| 2005 | Fat Actress | Kid Rock | Episode: "Charlie's Angels" |
| 2005 | Stacked | Delivery man | Episode: "Nobody Says I Love You" |
| 2006 | CSI: NY | Kid Rock | Episode: "All Access" |
| 2014 | 30 for 30 | Narrator | Documentary series; episode: "Bad Boys" |
| 2014 | Silicon Valley | Kid Rock | Episode: "Minimum Viable Product" |

== Tours ==
- Straight from the Underground Tour (1990) (opened for Ice Cube, Too $hort, D Nice and Yo-Yo)
- Pimp of the Nation Tour (1996–1997)
- Warped Tour (1998)
- Devil Without a Cause (1998–1999)
- M2K (2000)
- Summer Sanitarium Tour (2000)
- History of Rock Tour (2000)
- The American Badass Tour (2001)
- Cocky Tour (2002)
- Girls of Summer (2002)
- Rock N' Roll Pain Train Tour (2004)
- Live Trucker (2006)
- Ballroom Blitz Tour (2007)
- Rock N' Roll Revival Tour (2008)
- Rock N' Rebels Tour (2008–2009)
- The Circle Tour (2010)
- Born Free Tour (2011)
- Care Tour (2011)
- Rebel Soul Tour (2013)
- $20 Best Night Ever Tour (2013)
- Because We Can Tour (2013)
- Rock N' Rollin Tour (2014)
- First Kiss (2015)
- Kid Rock 2016 Tour (2016)
- American Rock N' Roll Tour (2018)
- Red Blooded Rock 'n' Roll Redneck Extravaganza (2018)
- Hot September Nights (2019)
- Bad Reputation Tour (2022–2023)
- Rock the Country festival (2024–2026)
