= Bad Reputation Tour =

2022–23 concert tour by Kid Rock

- Tour by Kid Rock
- Location: North America
- Associated album: Bad Reputation
- Start date: April 6, 2022
- End date: July 29, 2023
- No. of shows: 48

Kid Rock concert chronology
- Hot September Nights Tour (2019); Bad Reputation Tour (2022–23); Rock the Country Tour (2024-2026)

The Bad Reputation Tour was a concert tour by American rapper and singer Kid Rock in support of his twelfth studio album, Bad Reputation (2022). It began on April 6, 2022, in Evansville, Indiana and concluded on July 29, 2023, in Youngstown.

== Summary ==
On January 15, 2021, Kid Rock announced his "possible retirement". He noted that he had been performing on stages since the late 1980s, and that he doesn't think his health will allow him to be "on stage at age 70 like Mick Jagger". On January 24, 2022, Kid Rock announced a tour with Grand Funk Railroad, Jason Bonham's Led Zeppelin Evening, Foreigner, and an appearance by Trey Lewis at every show.

Kid Rock also threatened to cancel shows with any kind of restrictions related to the COVID-19 pandemic and reportedly cancelled a few shows including in Buffalo, New York and Toronto due to COVID-19 protocols.

== Typical setlist ==
1. "Devil Without a Cause"
2. "You Never Met a Motherfucker Quite Like Me"
3. "American Bad Ass"
4. "Cocky"
5. "All Summer Long"
6. "First Kiss"
7. "Don't Tell Me How to Live"
8. "Cowboy"
9. "My Kind of Country"
10. "Wasting Time"
11. "Bad Reputation"
12. "Picture"
13. "Dicked Down in Dallas" (with Trey Lewis)
14. "3 Sheets to the Wind (What's My Name)"/La Grange/"Cat Scratch Fever"/"Superstition"
15. "Rock n Roll Jesus"
16. "Only God Knows Why"
17. "Born Free"
18. Donald Trump Message/"We the People"
19. "Rockin'"
20. "Bawitdaba"

== Tour dates ==
Date	City	Country	Venue	Opening act(s)	Attendance
April 6, 2022	Evansville	United States	Ford Center	Grand Funk Railroad	11,000/11,000
April 8, 2022	Omaha	United States	CHI Health Center	Grand Funk Railroad	
April 9, 2022	St. Paul	United States	Xcel Energy Center	Grand Funk Railroad	
April 15, 2022	Columbus	United States	Nationwide Arena	Grand Funk Railroad	
April 16, 2022	Grand Rapids	United States	Van Andel Arena	Grand Funk Railroad	
April 30, 2022	Panama City Beach	United States	Frank Brown Park (Note: This concert was part of Thunder Beach Spring Rally)	—N/a	
May 20, 2022	Louisville	United States	KFC Yum Center	Jason Bonham's Led Zeppelin Evening	
May 21, 2022	Nashville	United States	Bridgestone Arena	Jason Bonham's Led Zeppelin Evening	18,500/18,500
June 10, 2022	West Palm Beach	United States	iTHINK Financial Amphitheatre	Grand Funk Railroad	
June 11, 2022	Tampa	United States	MidFlorida Credit Union Amphitheatre	Grand Funk Railroad	
June 15, 2022	Atlanta	United States	Cellairis Amphitheatre	Grand Funk Railroad	
June 17, 2022	Charlotte	United States	PNC Music Pavilion	Grand Funk Railroad	
June 18, 2022	Raleigh	United States	Coastal Credit Union Music Park	Grand Funk Railroad	
June 24, 2022	Houston	United States	Cynthia Woods Mitchell Pavilion	Foreigner	
June 25, 2022	Dallas	United States	Dos Equis Pavilion	Foreigner	
July 16, 2022	Topeka	United States	Heartland Motorsports Park (Note: This concert is part of Heartland Stampede Music Festival)	—N/a	
July 27, 2022	Cheyenne	United States	Cheyenne Frontier Days Arena (Note: This concert is part of Cheyenne Frontier Days)	—N/a	
August 2, 2022	Davenport	United States	Mississippi Valley Fairgrounds (Note: This concert is part of Mississippi Valley Fair)	—N/a	
August 5, 2022	Cuyahoga Falls	United States	Blossom Music Center	Foreigner	
August 6, 2022	Burgettstown	United States	The Pavilion at Star Lake	Foreigner	
August 12, 2022	Noblesville	United States	Ruoff Music Center	Foreigner	
August 17, 2022	Cincinnati	United States	Riverbend Music Center	Foreigner	
August 19, 2022	Tinley Park	United States	Hollywood Casino Amphitheatre	Foreigner	
August 20, 2022	Maryland Heights	United States	Hollywood Casino Amphitheatre	Foreigner	
August 24, 2022	Mansfield	United States	Xfinity Center	Foreigner	
August 26, 2022	Bristow	United States	Jiffy Lube Live	Foreigner	
August 27, 2022	Holmdel	United States	PNC Bank Arts Center	Foreigner	
September 3, 2022	Mt. Pleasant	United States	Soaring Eagle Casino & Resort	Buckcherry	
September 4, 2022	Mt. Pleasant	United States	Soaring Eagle Casino & Resort	Buckcherry	
September 16, 2022	Clarkston	United States	Pine Knob Music Theatre	Foreigner	
September 17, 2022	Clarkston	United States	Pine Knob Music Theatre	Foreigner	
September 30, 2022	Wheatland	United States	Toyota Amphitheatre	Grand Funk Railroad	
October 1, 2022	San Bernardino	United States	Glen Helen Amphitheater	Grand Funk Railroad	
October 7, 2022	Sparks	United States	Nugget Event Center	Cooper Alan	
October 8, 2022	Laughlin	United States	Laughlin Events Center	Cooper Alan	
June 2, 2023	Lincoln	United States	Thunder Valley Casino		
June 18, 2023	Wildwood	United States	Wildwood Beach (Note: This concert is part of the Barefoot Country Music Festival)	—N/a	
No Snowflakes Summer Concert Series
June 23, 2023	Austin	United States	Moody Center	Chris Janson	
June 24, 2023	Fort Worth	United States	Dickies Arena	Marcus King	
July 1, 2023	Nashville	United States	Bridgestone Arena	Travis Tritt	
July 8, 2023	Nashville	United States	Bridgestone Arena	Travis Tritt	
July 14, 2023	Detroit	United States	Little Caesars Arena	Grand Funk Railroad	
July 15, 2023	Detroit	United States	Little Caesars Arena	Grand Funk Railroad	
July 29, 2023	Youngstown	United States	Wean Park	—	
Kid Rock Live
March 21, 2025	Omaha	United States	CHI Health Center	Chris Janson	
March 22, 2025	Minneapolis	United States	Target Center	Chris Janson	
March 28, 2025	Louisville	United States	KFC Yum! Center	Chris Janson	
March 29, 2025	Milwaukee	United States	Fiserv Forum	Chris Janson	
April 11, 2025	Oklahoma City	United States	Paycom Center	Uncle Kracker	
April 18, 2025	Wichita	United States	Intrust Bank Arena	Uncle Kracker	
April 19, 2025	Kansas City	United States	T-Mobile Center	Uncle Kracker	

=== Cancelled shows ===
Date	City	Country	Venue	Reason
July 22, 2022	Minot	United States	North Dakota State Fair Grandstand (Note: This concert would've been part of the North Dakota State Fair)	Severe weather conditions
August 13, 2022	Oshkosh	United States	Ford Festival Park (Note: This concert would've been part of Rock USA Fest)	Festival cancelled
—N/a	Buffalo	United States	KeyBank Center	COVID-19 guidelines
—N/a	Toronto	Canada	Scotiabank Arena	COVID-19 guidelines
October 2, 2022	Mountain View	United States	Shoreline Amphitheatre	Unknown

== Personnel ==
- Kid Rock — lead vocals, guitar, turntables, drums, saxophone
- Jason Krause — rhythm guitar, acoustic guitar
- Marlon Young — lead guitar
- Paradime — turntables, background vocals
- Jimmie Bones — keyboard, organ, piano, harmonica
- Aaron Julison — bass
- Tim "Fiddleman" Watson — fiddle
- Stefanie Eulinberg — drums
- Larry Fratangelo — percussion
- Shannon Curfman — guitar, background vocals
- Herschel Boone — background vocals and lead vocals on "Superstitious"
- Kat Perkins — background vocals
