= First Kiss =

First Kiss may refer to:

== Art ==
- L'Amour et Psyché, enfants, incorrectly called Le premier baiser

== Film, TV and entertainment ==
- The First Kiss (1928 American film), a 1928 American silent film starring Fay Wray and Gary Cooper
- The First Kiss (1928 German film), a 1928 German silent comedy film
- The First Kiss (1954 film), a 1954 West German comedy film
- First Kiss (1998 film), 1998 South Korea film directed by Kim Tae-kyun
- First Kiss (2012 film), 2012 film starring Brenda Song
- First Kiss (2014 film), a 2014 American short film
- First Kiss (TV series), a 2007 Japanese television drama series
- "First Kiss" (The Upper Hand), a 1990 television episode
- First Kiss Story, visual romance novel
- First Kiss Story II, visual romance novel
- "First Kiss (On The Lips, That Is)", an episode of The Naked Brothers Band

== Music ==
- First Kiss (Aya Matsuura album), 2002
- First Kiss (Kid Rock album), 2015
  - "First Kiss" (Kid Rock song), 2015
- First Kiss (Ipsitaa and Yo Yo Honey Singh song), 2020 song by Ipsitaa and Yo Yo Honey Singh
- "First Kiss", a song by Jay Chou from the 2007 album Secret
- First Kiss, a 1997 album by Richard Smith
- "First Kiss", a song by i5 from the soundtrack to Center Stage
- "First Kiss", a song by Ryan O'Shaughnessy

== Other ==
- First Kiss (apple), also known as rave and MN55, an apple cultivar developed in Minnesota
