= Trey Lewis (singer) =

American singer-songwriter

- Born: 1986 or 1987 (age 38–39); Birmingham, Alabama, U.S.
- Genres: Country
- Occupation: Singer-songwriter
- Instruments: Vocals and Guitar
- Years active: 2020–present
- Label: Trey Lewis

Trey Lewis (born ca. 1987) is an American country music singer. Lewis first gained attention in 2020 for his self-released single "Dicked Down in Dallas".

== Biography ==
Trey Lewis was born in Birmingham, Alabama around 1987. He aspired to be a country music singer since childhood, citing Garth Brooks as an influence. Lewis stated that he had never played guitar until after completing rehabilitation for an alcohol addiction, at which point he began playing guitar while holding a job at a smoothie shop. From this, he moved to Nashville, Tennessee to begin performing at bars and writing songs. He met songwriters Brent Gafford, Drew Trosclair, and Matt McKinney, who provided him with a song idea they had called "Gone Back to Dallas". The writers then decided to add references to sex acts in the lyrics and thus rename the song "Dicked Down in Dallas"; they did this to appeal the song to Lewis, whom they knew liked to insert profanity into his cover songs in concert. When the song proved successful in concert, he recorded a studio version which was produced by Alex Maxwell and Grady Saxman. The song gained further attention in 2020 when fans began recording TikTok videos using it. By December 2020, "Dicked Down in Dallas" had entered the Billboard Hot Country Songs chart at No. 12. The Los Angeles Times included "Dicked Down in Dallas" on its list of the worst songs of 2020, criticizing its slut-shaming lyrics. Lewis also recorded and released the remix version of "Dicked Down in Dallas", which features guest vocals from country rap artist Rvshvd, on April 13, 2021. In 2022 he supported Kid Rock on his Bad Reputation Tour to perform "Dicked Down in Dallas" with Twisted Brown Trucker.

== Discography ==
Year	Single	Peak chart positions			Certifications
Year	Single	US	US Country	CAN Digital	Certifications
2020	"Dicked Down in Dallas"	65	12	2	RIAA: 2× Platinum; RMNZ: Gold
2023	"Up Yours"	—	—	—	
