= Bad Reputation (Kid Rock album) =

Studio album by Kid Rock
- Released: March 21, 2022
- Recorded: 2019–2021
- Studios: The Allen Roadhouse, Clarkston, Michigan; Dixie Ridge, Nashville, Tennessee
- Genres: Southern rock; country; rap rock
- Length: 71:30
- Label: Top Dog Records
- Producer: Kid Rock

Kid Rock chronology
Sweet Southern Sugar (2017)	Bad Reputation (2022)	Halfway 2 Jesus (2026)

Singles from Bad Reputation
- 1. "Don't Tell Me How to Live" Released: November 18, 2021; 2. "Ala-Fuckin-Bama" Released: December 17, 2021; 3. "The Last Dance" Released: January 24, 2022; 4. "Rockin'" Released: January 24, 2022; 5. "We the People" Released: January 24, 2022

Bad Reputation is the twelfth studio album by American musician Kid Rock. It was released digitally on March 21, 2022, and on physical CD on April 6, 2022, by Top Dog Records. The album spawned five singles: "Don't Tell Me How to Live" which features Monster Truck, "Ala-Fuckin-Bama", "We the People", "The Last Dance" and "Rockin'", and three music videos were released. This was Kid Rock's first album since 1996's Early Mornin' Stoned Pimp to be released by Top Dog Records independently.

== Background ==
The album was at first announced in late 2019 and was originally scheduled for release in 2021. On January 17, 2021, he held a birthday live stream event and originally announced the name of his album to be Kid Motherfuckin' Rock and announced a total of 50 songs including 10 hip hop songs, 10 rock songs, 10 country songs and 20 previously unreleased songs. The album name was announced in January 2022 during a birthday bash concert at Billy Bob's in Fort Worth, Texas.

== Music and lyrics ==
Bad Reputation is a Southern rock and country album. Some of the lyrics reflect Kid Rock's support of President Donald Trump and criticism of Joe Biden. "Don't Tell Me How to Live" is a rap rock cover of a song by Monster Truck, who are featured on the recording. The song's sound was compared to that of the album Devil Without a Cause. The song "We the People" attacks the media, Dr. Anthony Fauci, masks, COVID-19 restrictions, and Big Tech, and features the chant "Let's go Brandon" in the chorus.

== Reception ==
Professional ratings
Review scores
Source	Rating
AllMusic	1.5/5 stars

Upon its initial release, Bad Reputation failed to chart on the Billboard 200 chart in its first week of eligibility, breaking a streak of top 10 debuts on the chart dating back to Cocky in 2001. The album debuted on Billboard's Independent Albums chart at number 31, the Top Rock Albums chart at number 39, the Top Current Album Sales chart at number 9 and the Top Album Sales chart at number 15. Two weeks after its release, the album had sold 25,000 copies.

It debuted at number 124 on the Billboard 200 chart on April 23, 2022, a month after its release.

In his review for AllMusic, Stephen Thomas Erlewine called it "a record that confirms [Kid Rock's] diminished status by catering exclusively to the only audience he has left: aging hard rockers who also are stuck in the past."

== Touring ==
On April 6, 2022, Kid Rock embarked on his Bad Reputation Tour. Ritchie had announced he would specifically not tour locations with COVID-19 mask and vaccine mandates.

== Track listing ==
Bad Reputation track listing
No.	Title	Writer(s)	Length
1.	"Don't Tell Me How to Live" (featuring Monster Truck)	Robert James Ritchie, Brandon Bliss, Jeremy Widerman, Jon Harvey, Steve Kiely	4:04
2.	"We the People"	Robert James Ritchie, Jason Wyatt	4:09
3.	"My Kind of Country"	Robert James Ritchie, Adam Hood, Eric Church	3:56
4.	"Bad Reputation"	Robert James Ritchie, John Eddie	4:09
5.	"Never Quit"	Robert James Ritchie, Edward Martin, Jim Jonsin	3:20
6.	"Shakedown" (featuring Robert James)	Robert James Ritchie, Edward Martin, Gannin Arnold, Jim Jonsin	2:41
7.	"Rockin'"	Robert James Ritchie, Marlin Young, John Eddie	3:41
8.	"The Last Dance"	Robert James Ritchie	4:01
9.	"See You Again"	Robert James Ritchie	5:50
10.	"Still Somethin'"	Robert James Ritchie, Andy Albert, Jordan Schmidt, Mitchell Tenpenny, Morgan Wallen	4:08
11.	"She's Your Baby (Now Rock Her)"	Robert James Ritchie, James Trombly, Loretta Lynn	4:15
12.	"Never Enough"	Robert James Ritchie, Bay Simpson, Heath Owen, James LeBlanc	3:43
13.	"Everything to Me"	Robert James Ritchie	4:27
14.	"Cold Beer"	Robert James Ritchie, Shea Michael Ladner	4:10
15.	"Ala-Fuckin-Bama"	Jay Speight, Scott Lynch	3:56
16.	"Am What I Am"	Robert James Ritchie, Tyler Hubbard, Corey Crowder, Michael Hobby	2:58
17.	"The Nashville I Know"	Robert James Ritchie, Curtis Guenther, Matthew Rogers	3:39
18.	"Fifty"	Robert James Ritchie, John Eddie	4:23
Total length:			71:30

== Personnel ==
- Robert James Ritchie Sr. – drum programming, drums, acoustic guitar, keyboards, percussion, background vocals, B3 Organ, turntables

=== Additional personnel ===
Backing vocalists

- Herschel Boone – background vocals
- Shannon Curfman – background vocals
- Gretchen Wilson – background vocals
- Robert James – background vocals
- Perry Coleman – background vocals
- Kate Falcon – background vocals
- Victoria Camp – background vocals
- Amanda Gene Rowland – background vocals
- Stacy Michelle – background vocals
- Mason Douglas – background vocals (uncredited)
- Jason Wyatt – background vocals (uncredited)

Drummers

- Jerry Roe
- Greg Morrow
- Evan Hutchings
- Miles McPherson
- John "Rook" Cappelletty
- Richard Millsap

Others

- Mark Douthit – saxophone
- Russ Phal – pedal steel guitar
- Max Abrams – saxophone
- Marlon Young – bass guitar, acoustic guitar, electric guitar
- David Roe Rorick – bass, drums
- Peter G Abbott – engineer
- Jimmie "Bones" Trombly – keyboards, piano, B3 Organ, harmonica
- Tim Watson – fiddle
- T.J. Watson – acoustic guitar, vocals

Guitarists

- Gordy Quist – electric guitar
- Adam Shoenfeld – electric guitar
- Ed Jurdi – acoustic guitar
- Nathan Young – electric guitar
- Rob McNelley – electric guitar
- Vinnie Dombroski – electric guitar
- Nick Bockrath – electric guitar
- Tom Bukovac – electric guitar
- Gordy Quist – acoustic guitar
- Dean James – electric and acoustic guitar
- Gannin Arnold – electric guitar

Pianists

- Peter Keys – keyboards
- Jim Jonsin – keyboards
- Gordon Mote – piano (credited as "Gordan Mote")
- Jim "Moose" Brown – piano, B3 Organ
- Dave Cohen – piano, B3 Organ, keyboards, synths

Bassists

- Jimmie Lee Sloas – bass guitar
- Alison Prestwood – bass guitar
- Scott Davis – bass guitar
- Mark Hill – bass guitar
- Tony Lucido – bass guitar

== Charts ==
Chart performance for Bad Reputation
Chart (2022)	Peak position
US Billboard 200	124
US Independent Albums (Billboard)	19
US Top Rock Albums (Billboard)	22
