= Follow Me (Uncle Kracker song) =

2000 single by Uncle Kracker

Single by Uncle Kracker

from the album Double Wide
- B-side: "Yeah, Yeah, Yeah"
- Released: November 6, 2000
- Studio: Outside the Tsongas Arena (Lowell, Massachusetts)
- Length: 3:35
- Label: Lava; Atlantic; Top Dog
- Songwriters: Matthew Shafer; Michael Bradford
- Producer: Kid Rock

Uncle Kracker singles chronology
"Follow Me" (2000)	"Yeah, Yeah, Yeah" (2001)

Music video
- "Follow Me" on YouTube

"Follow Me" is a song by American musician Uncle Kracker. It was released as his debut solo single on November 6, 2000, serving as lead single from his first studio album, Double Wide (2000). The song was written by Kracker and Michael Bradford and was produced by Kid Rock with additional production from Bradford. According to Kracker, the song has multiple meanings, with people speculating that it could be about drugs or infidelity.

"Follow Me" became a worldwide hit in mid to late 2001. The song reached number one in eight countries: Australia, Austria, Denmark, Germany, Ireland, New Zealand, Scotland, and Sweden. In the United States, it peaked at number five on the Billboard Hot 100 and topped the Adult Top 40 listing. It additionally became a top-10 hit in Norway, Switzerland, and the United Kingdom and peaked within the top 40 in several other European countries.

== Meaning ==
In a 2001 interview with MTV News, Uncle Kracker stated that "Follow Me" was "definitely different" from other songs on Double Wide:

"[W]hen we first started recording that song, with us being from Detroit, that song was supposed to be this doo-wop/Motown song — something different, because every song's got its own little twist. And this song was supposed to have that, but after we recorded it, I was like, 'Man, that could be something for radio,' so we switched it back. [The song] takes on a couple of different meanings. I've heard some people think that I'm talking about drugs, or some people think I'm talking about cheating. I guess it's kinda both. I would never want to say anything that would get myself in trouble, being married with a couple of kids. That song is like a dirty picture painted with a pretty brush."

== Chart performance ==
The song went to number one in Australia, Austria, Denmark, Germany, Ireland, New Zealand, Scotland, and Sweden. In the United States, it peaked at number five on the Billboard Hot 100 chart the week of June 9, 2001, and is Uncle Kracker's highest-charting single release to date. The single also reached number seven on the adult contemporary chart. In the United Kingdom, the song peaked at number three on the UK Singles Chart in September 2001. Following the release of the album Double Wide on iTunes, the song re-entered the UK Singles Chart on August 26, 2012, at number 64 and reached number 44.

== Track listings ==
US 7-inch single

A. "Follow Me" – 3:34
B. "Yeah, Yeah, Yeah" – 4:57

Australian CD single

1. "Follow Me" (radio version) – 3:37
2. "Follow Me" (DJ Homicide remix) – 3:28
3. "Follow Me" (album version) – 3:35
4. "Yeah, Yeah, Yeah" (album version enhanced video) – 3:35

European CD single

1. "Follow Me" (radio version) – 3:37
2. "Follow Me" (DJ Homicide remix) – 3:28

UK CD single

1. "Follow Me" (DJ Homicide remix) – 3:28
2. "Follow Me" (album version) – 3:35
3. "Follow Me" (radio version) – 3:37
4. "Follow Me" (enhanced video)

UK cassette single

1. "Follow Me" (DJ Homicide remix) – 3:28
2. "Follow Me" (album version) – 3:35
3. "Follow Me" (radio version) – 3:37

== Credits and personnel ==
Credits are taken from the Double Wide liner notes.

Recording

- Written on the back of a tour bus
- Recorded outside the Tsongas Arena (Lowell, Massachusetts)
- Mixed at the Hotel Pere, Room 202 (Peoria, Illinois), the Marquette Hotel, Room 757 (Minneapolis, Minnesota), and the Hotel Allegro, Room 827 (Chicago, Illinois)
- Mastered at Masterdisk (New York City)

Personnel

- Uncle Kracker – writing (as Matthew Shafer)
- Michael Bradford – writing, backing vocals, bass, additional production, programming, mixing, engineering
- Kid Rock – harmonies, guitars, drum programming, production, mixing
- Jimmie Bones – harmonies, keyboards
- Kenny Olson – lead guitar
- Jason Krause – metal guitar
- Stefanie Eulinberg – additional drums
- Andy VanDette – mastering

== Charts ==
=== Weekly charts ===
Chart (2001–2016)	Peak position
Australia (ARIA)	1
Austria (Ö3 Austria Top 40)	1
Belgium (Ultratop 50 Flanders)	25
Belgium (Ultratip Bubbling Under Wallonia)	12
Belgium (VRT Top 30 Flanders)	15
Canada CHR (Nielsen BDS)	2
Denmark (Tracklisten)	1
Denmark Airplay (Tracklisten)	1
Europe (Eurochart Hot 100)	2
France (SNEP)	91
Germany (GfK)	1
Hungary (Rádiós Top 40)	26
Ireland (IRMA)	1
Netherlands (Dutch Top 40)	31
Netherlands (Single Top 100)	30
New Zealand (Recorded Music NZ)	1
Norway (VG-lista)	6
Poland Airplay (Music & Media)	16
Scottish Singles Sales (Official Charts)	1
Sweden (Sverigetopplistan)	1
Switzerland (Schweizer Hitparade)	3
UK Singles (Official Charts)	3
US Billboard Hot 100	5
US Adult Contemporary (Billboard)	7
US Adult Pop Airplay (Billboard)	1
US Pop Airplay (Billboard)	3
US Rock Digital Songs (Billboard)	30
US Top 40 Tracks (Billboard)	3

=== Year-end charts ===
Chart (2001)	Position
Australia (ARIA)	49
Austria (Ö3 Austria Top 40)	8
Brazil (Crowley)	77
Canada (Nielsen SoundScan)	150
Canada Radio (Nielsen BDS)	5
Europe (Eurochart Hot 100)	21
Germany (Media Control)	8
Ireland (IRMA)	16
Netherlands (Dutch Top 40)	194
New Zealand (RIANZ)	6
Sweden (Hitlistan)	11
Switzerland (Schweizer Hitparade)	31
UK Singles (OCC)	28
US Billboard Hot 100	19
US Adult Contemporary (Billboard)	21
US Adult Top 40 (Billboard)	6
US Mainstream Top 40 (Billboard)	5
US Top 40 Tracks (Billboard)	13

Chart (2002)	Position
US Adult Contemporary (Billboard)	26

=== Decade-end charts ===
Chart (2000–2009)	Position
Germany (Media Control GfK)	77

== Certifications ==
Region	Certification	Certified units/sales
Australia (ARIA)	Platinum	70,000^{^}
Austria (IFPI Austria)	Gold	20,000^{*}
Germany (BVMI)	Gold	250,000^{^}
New Zealand (RMNZ)	3× Platinum	90,000^{‡}
Sweden (GLF)	Platinum	30,000^{^}
United Kingdom (BPI)	Platinum	600,000^{‡}
^{*} Sales figures based on certification alone.^{^} Shipments figures based on certification alone.^{‡} Sales+streaming figures based on certification alone.

== Release history ==
Region	Date	Format(s)	Label(s)	Ref(s).
United States	November 6, 2000	Hot adult contemporary; modern adult contemporary radio	Lava; Atlantic; Top Dog	
United States	November 7, 2000	Contemporary hit radio	Lava; Atlantic; Top Dog	
United States	April 23, 2001	Adult contemporary radio	Lava; Atlantic; Top Dog	
Australia	May 21, 2001	CD	Lava; Atlantic; Top Dog	
United Kingdom	August 27, 2001	CD	Lava; Atlantic; Top Dog	

== Appearances and covers ==
This song was featured in the movies Coyote Ugly, 3000 Miles to Graceland, The Animal, The Blind Side and the TV series Roswell High. In 2011, the song was covered by the German rock and roll cover band the Baseballs. The song appeared on their second album, Strings 'N' Stripes. A live version of "Follow Me" can be found on David Allan Coe's 2003 album Live at Billy Bob's Texas.
