= Sweet Southern Sugar =

Studio album by Kid Rock
- Released: November 3, 2017
- Studios: The Allen Roadhouse (Clarkston, Michigan); Starstruck Studios (Nashville, Tennessee); Sound Stage Studios (Nashville, Tennessee)
- Genres: Southern rock; country
- Length: 43:02
- Labels: Broken Bow; Top Dog; BMG

Kid Rock chronology
First Kiss (2015)	Sweet Southern Sugar (2017)	Bad Reputation (2022)

Singles from Sweet Southern Sugar
- 1. "Po-Dunk" Released: July 13, 2017; 2. "Greatest Show on Earth" Released: July 13, 2017; 3. "Tennessee Mountain Top" Released: October 19, 2017; 4. "American Rock 'n Roll" Released: January 22, 2018

Professional ratings
Review scores
Source	Rating
AllMusic	3/5 stars
Rolling Stone	3/5 stars

Sweet Southern Sugar is the eleventh studio album by American musician Kid Rock. It was released on November 3, 2017, by Broken Bow Records, Top Dog Records and BMG Rights Management. The album spawned four singles: "Po-Dunk", "Greatest Show on Earth", "Tennessee Mountain Top", and "American Rock 'n Roll", along with their music videos. Its lead single, "Po-Dunk", peaked at number 27 on the Hot Country Songs. "Greatest Show on Earth" peaked at number 16 on the Mainstream Rock chart and it was used as the main theme for WWE pay-per-view Survivor Series (2017). "Tennessee Mountain Top" peaked at number 36 on the Hot Country Songs.

Sweet Southern Sugar is Kid Rock's first album since his self-titled 2003 album not to feature a title track, though the album's name comes from a lyric in "Tennessee Mountain Top". The album also features a cover of the Four Tops song "I Can't Help Myself (Sugar Pie Honey Bunch)", titled "Sugar Pie Honey Bunch". The songs "Back to the Otherside" and "Grandpa's Jam" feature a return to the rapping vocals of Rock's earlier work.

== Commercial performance ==
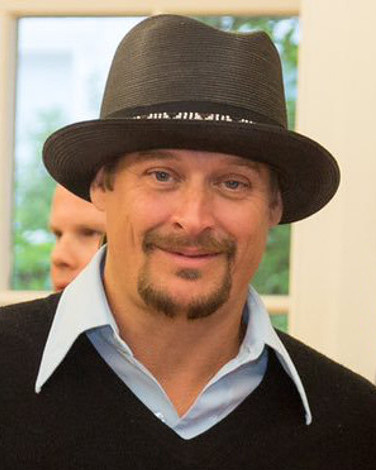
Kid Rock at the White House in 2017

Sweet Southern Sugar debuted at number eight on the US Billboard 200 and number four on the US Billboard Top Country Albums with 43,000 album-equivalent units; almost all of that figure (41,000) came from pure album sales. It has sold 184,600 copies in the United States as of April 2019.

== Track listing ==
No.	Title	Writer(s)	Length
1.	"Greatest Show on Earth"	Robert James Ritchie; Tim Montana; Marlon Young; Catt Gravitt	3:59
2.	"Po-Dunk"	Robert James Ritchie; Walker Hayes; Tony Haselden; John Ozier	4:31
3.	"Tennessee Mountain Top"	Robert James Ritchie; Tim Montana; Catt Gravitt	4:34
4.	"I Wonder"	Robert James Ritchie	3:18
5.	"American Rock 'n Roll"	Robert James Ritchie; Joey Hyde; Aaron Eshuis; Neil Medley	4:35
6.	"Back to the Otherside"	Robert James Ritchie; Zane Lowe; Hamish Clark; Andy Lovegrove	4:51
7.	"Raining Whiskey" (Frankie Miller and Ralph Murphy)	Frankie Miller; Ralph Murphy	3:59
8.	"Stand the Pain"	Robert James Ritchie	4:44
9.	"Sugar Pie Honey Bunch" (Four Tops cover)	Brian Holland; Lamont Dozier; Eddie Holland	4:11
10.	"Grandpa's Jam"	Robert James Ritchie; Marlon Young	4:14
Total length:			43:02

== Charts ==
=== Weekly charts ===
Chart (2017)	Peak position
Austrian Albums (Ö3 Austria)	64
Canadian Albums (Billboard)	15
German Albums (Offizielle Top 100)	88
New Zealand Heatseeker Albums (RMNZ)	10
Swiss Albums (Schweizer Hitparade)	43
US Billboard 200	8
US Independent Albums (Billboard)	1
US Top Country Albums (Billboard)	4
US Top Rock Albums (Billboard)	1

=== Year-end charts ===
Chart (2017)	Position
US Top Country Albums (Billboard)	89

Chart (2018)	Position
US Top Country Albums (Billboard)	48
US Top Rock Albums (Billboard)	63

== Personnel ==
listed inside the booklet from the album:

=== Kid Rock ===
- Robert James Ritchie Sr. – drum programming, drums, acoustic guitar, keyboards, percussion, background vocals, B3 organ, turntables

=== Additional personnel ===
==== Backing vocalists ====
- Herschel Boone – background vocals
- Danny Rader – background vocals
- Joey Hyde – background vocals
- Shannon Curfman – background vocals
- Aaron Eshuis – background vocals
- Stacy Michelle – background vocals
- Kristen Rogers – background vocals
- Morgan Hebert – background vocals
- Stephcynie Curry – background vocals

==== Drummers ====
- Jerry Roe
- Stefanie Eulinberg
- John "Rook" Cappelletty

==== Others ====
- Paradime – tambourine, turntables
- Jimmie Bones – piano, background vocals
- Marlon Young – bass guitar, acoustic guitar, electric guitar
- Mike E. Clark – drum programming, producer

==== Guitarists ====
- Gordy Quist – electric guitar
- Adam Shoenfeld – electric guitar
- Nathan Young – electric guitar
- Jason Krause – electric guitar
- Derek Wells – electric guitar
- Rob McNelley – electric guitar

==== Pianists ====
- Tim Lauer – piano, keyboards, mellotron, synth, Rhodes, strings (string machine)
- Justin Niebank – piano, synth
- Jim "Moose" Brown – piano, B3 organ
- Dave Cohen – piano, B3 organ, keyboards, synths

==== Bassists ====
- Jimmie Lee Sloas – bass guitar
- Tony Lucido – bass guitar
- Aaron Julison – bass guitar
