= Rebel Soul (Kid Rock album) =

Studio album by Kid Rock
- Released: November 19, 2012
- Recorded: August–October 2012
- Studios: The Allen Roadhouse, Clarkston, Michigan
- Genres: Rock and roll; blue-eyed soul
- Length: 65:30
- Labels: Atlantic; Top Dog
- Producer: Kid Rock

Kid Rock chronology
Born Free (2010)	Rebel Soul (2012)	First Kiss (2015)

Singles from Rebel Soul
- 1. "Let's Ride" Released: October 3, 2012; 2. "Rebel Soul" Released: 2013

Rebel Soul is the ninth studio album by American musician Kid Rock and his final release with Atlantic Records. The album was released on November 19, 2012, and was self-produced by Kid Rock. It is his first since 2007's Rock N Roll Jesus to feature his backing band Twisted Brown Trucker; they were not featured on 2010's Born Free. The song "Redneck Paradise" was written by The Young Brothers in 2007 and was sent to Kid Rock's representatives in the hopes that he would use it.

The album was described as a mixture of Southern rock, soul, blues, gospel and the Motown Sound.

As of February 2015, it had sold 592,000 copies in the US.

During NASCAR's 2012 Race to the Chase, Kid Rock introduced the last 10 races with a selection of songs from the album, including "Let's Ride," the title track, "The Mirror," "Celebrate," and "Mr. Rock N Roll." "Let's Ride" was used as one of the official theme songs for WWE's 2012 Tribute to the Troops event, while "Celebrate" became the official theme song for WrestleMania XXX. Both songs were once again used for WrestleMania 34, along with another Kid Rock song, "New Orleans," from the album Rock and Roll Jesus. Additionally, "Let's Ride" was featured in the 2014 film Into The Storm.

== Reception ==
Professional ratings
Aggregate scores
Source	Rating
Metacritic	67/100
Review scores
Source	Rating
AllMusic	3.5/5 stars
The A.V. Club	C
Billboard	4/5 stars
Classic Rock	3.5/5 stars
Country Weekly	B
Entertainment Weekly	B−
God Is in the TV	1/5
Rolling Stone	3.5/5 stars
Slant Magazine	2/5 stars
Spill Magazine	4/5 stars

According to the review aggregator Metacritic, Rebel Soul received "generally favorable reviews" based on a weighted average score of 67 out of 100 from 9 critic scores. In a 2014 interview with Rolling Stone, Rock admitted that he regretted making the album, stating "I didn't spend enough time on it at all".

== Track listing ==
No.	Title	Writer(s)	Length
1.	"Chickens In The Pen"	Robert James Ritchie; Marlon Young; Matthew Shafer	4:49
2.	"Let's Ride"	Robert James Ritchie; Marlon Young	4:50
3.	"3 CATT Boogie"	Robert James Ritchie; Marlon Young; Matthew Shafer	4:24
4.	"Detroit, Michigan"	Robert James Ritchie; Clara Williams; Mac Rice; Tony Clarke	3:56
5.	"Rebel Soul"	Robert James Ritchie; Marlon Young; Jason Krause; Matthew Shafer	4:02
6.	"God Save Rock N Roll"	Robert James Ritchie	5:21
7.	"Happy New Year"	Robert James Ritchie; John Eddie	3:34
8.	"Celebrate"	Robert James Ritchie; Audley Freed; Keith Gattis	4:01
9.	"The Mirror"	Robert James Ritchie	4:46
10.	"Mr. Rock N Roll"	Robert James Ritchie; Marlon Young; Matthew Shafer	6:37
11.	"Cucci Galore"	Robert James Ritchie; Christopher Kennedy	4:25
12.	"Redneck Paradise"	Robert James Ritchie; Eric Young; Jason Young; Marlon Young	5:12
13.	"Cocaine And Gin"	Mark Miers; Joe Harry	4:15
14.	"Midnight Ferry"	Robert James Ritchie	5:18
Total length:			65:30

Australian bonus track
No.	Title	Writer(s)	Length
15.	"Wasting Time" (remix)	Robert James Ritchie; Matthew Shafer; Lindsey Buckingham

== Personnel ==
- Kid Rock – vocals, guitars, piano, keyboards, organ, mellotron, slide guitar, bass, drums, percussion
- Marlon Young – guitars, slide guitar
- Jason Krause – guitar
- Blake Mills – guitar
- Aaron Julison – bass
- Dave McMurray – saxophone
- Jimmie Bones – piano, organ, keyboards
- Stephanie Eulinberg – drums, percussion
- Jessica Wagner – background vocals
- Herschel C Boone – background vocals
- Paul Franklin – violin
- Dan Dugmore – banjo
- Aubrey Freed – violin

== Charts ==
=== Weekly charts ===
Chart (2012)	Peak position
Austrian Albums (Ö3 Austria)	26
Canadian Albums (Billboard)	10
German Albums (Offizielle Top 100)	24
Italian Albums (FIMI)	87
Swiss Albums (Schweizer Hitparade)	12
US Billboard 200	5
US Top Rock Albums (Billboard)	2

=== Year-end charts ===
Chart (2013)	Position
US Billboard 200	39
US Top Rock Albums (Billboard)	6

== Certifications ==
Region	Certification	Certified units/sales
United States (RIAA)	Gold	500,000^{^}
^{^} Shipments figures based on certification alone.
