= Don't Tell Me How to Live =

2021 single by Kid Rock featuring Monster Truck

Single by Kid Rock featuring Monster Truck

from the album Bad Reputation
- Released: November 18, 2021
- Genre: Rap rock; southern rock; nu metal; hard rock
- Length: 4:02
- Label: Top Dog
- Songwriters: Kid Rock, Brandon Bliss, Jeremy Widerman, Jon Harvey, Steve Kiely
- Producer: Kid Rock

Kid Rock singles chronology
"American Rock 'n Roll" (2018)	"Don't Tell Me How to Live" (2021)	"Ala-Fuckin-Bama" (2021)

Monster Truck singles chronology
"Evolution" (2018)	"Don't Tell Me How to Live" (2021)	"Golden Woman" (2022)

Music video
- "Don't Tell Me How to Live" on YouTube

"Don't Tell Me How to Live" is a song by American musician Kid Rock released on November 18, 2021 by Top Dog Records as the lead single from his 12th studio album, Bad Reputation (2022). It samples the song of the same name by Canadian rock band Monster Truck, who are credited as a featured artist.

== Background ==
Kid Rock recorded the song with Monster Truck in late 2019, it started after he ranted about Oprah Winfrey at his Nashville bar. He teased the chorus and the first verse in various Instagram live streams, and shared a snippet on January 17, 2021 on his birthday, Before he played the song at the party he stated that he was "sick of the snowflakes going after people for no reason".

In the third verse he makes references to Rev Run, David Lee Roth, Bruce Springsteen, Willie Nelson, and Brad Pitt comparing himself to them (personality wise).

== Music video ==
The video, directed by Blake Judd, starts out with Kid Rock standing in front of a TV display showing news reports of himself regarding his controversial statements towards Oprah Winfrey, Joy Behar, and Al Sharpton along with the time when he called people filming his performance at a private party in Tennessee "faggots". He then is seen outside his Tennessee Double Wide with his cars and motorcycles while Monster Truck is standing. During the turntable/guitar solo, Kid Rock is seen flying on a middle finger statue called the "Kid Rocket". The video uses a noticeably large number of green screen effects.

== Reception ==
Upon the release of the single, it was met with negative reception, with criticism directed toward its lyrics, message, and music video. Some critics have referred to the single as a parody song by "Weird Al" Yankovic. After receiving tweets praising him for the supposed parody, Weird Al then tweeted back confirming that he had no involvement.
