= Dicked Down in Dallas =

2020 single by Trey Lewis

Single by Trey Lewis
- Released: December 1, 2020
- Genre: Country rock
- Length: 3:21
- Label: Trey Lewis
- Songwriters: Brent Gafford; Drew Trosclair; Matt Mckinney
- Producers: Alex Maxwell; Grady Saxman

Music video
- "Dicked Down in Dallas" on YouTube

"Dicked Down in Dallas" is the debut single by American country music singer Trey Lewis. It was released on December 1, 2020. The song was co-written by Brent Gafford, Drew Trosclair and Matt Mckinney, and produced by Alex Maxwell and Grady Saxman.

== Background ==
In an interview with Rolling Stone, Lewis explained the song's original title was called "She's Going Back to Dallas". He wrote the first verse years ago in college, trying to finish it at Gafford, Texas: "We hit a wall and didn't know how to hit it from the best angle. 'Shes dicked down in Dallas.' We were laughing so hard, we pulled our buddy Drew Trosclair in on it. McKinney came up with the idea for the cities and their alliterative sex acts. Somewhere around March, McKinney sent me a finished version, it became a campfire thing. It's one of those songs that when the chorus hits, it's like, 'Let's go, baby'!"

== Content ==
"Dicked Down in Dallas" describes a jilted man "concern[ed] that his ex girlfriend — one he'd very much like back — is gallivanting across the country and having sex with numerous men in different states.

== Remix ==
Lewis also recorded and released the remix version of "Dicked Down in Dallas", which features guest vocals from country rap artist Rvshvd, on April 13, 2021.

== Critical reception ==
The Los Angeles Times commented that the song "[is] the worst songs of 2020", "ends up a bummer thanks to its slut-shaming moralism." Website The Musical Hype felt it should be "taken with a grain of salt."

== Commercial performance ==
Due to its lyrics, the song attracted attention on TikTok, with users "applying their own states' towns to the lyrics." It reached number one at US iTunes sales chart, No. 65 at Billboard Hot 100 and No. 12 at Hot Country Songs chart. He performed the song at every show on Kid Rock's Bad Reputation Tour

== Charts ==
=== Weekly charts ===
Weekly chart performance for "Dicked Down in Dallas"
Chart (2020)	Peak position
US Billboard Hot 100	65
US Hot Country Songs (Billboard)	12

=== Year-end charts ===
Year-end chart performance for "Dicked Down in Dallas"
Chart (2021)	Position
US Hot Country Songs (Billboard)	87

== Certifications ==
Certifications for "Dicked Down in Dallas"
Region	Certification	Certified units/sales
New Zealand (RMNZ)	Gold	15,000^{‡}
United States (RIAA)	2× Platinum	2,000,000^{‡}
^{‡} Sales+streaming figures based on certification alone.
