= Dave McMurray =

American jazz musician

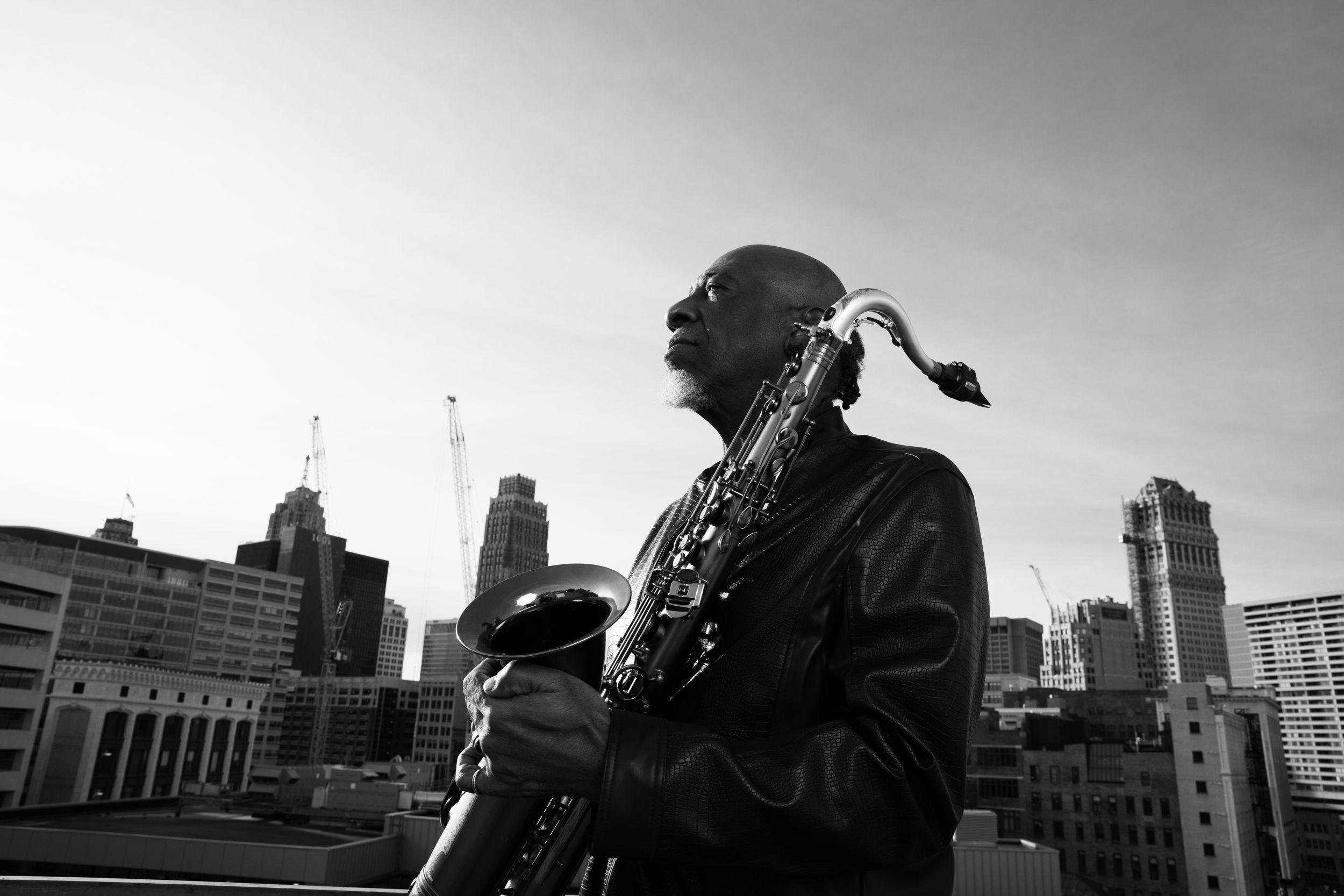

Background information
- Born: 1958 (age 67–68); Detroit, Michigan, U.S.
- Genre: Jazz
- Occupations: Musician, composer, producer
- Instruments: Saxophone, flute, keyboard, percussion
- Years active: 1972–present
- Labels: Hip Bop, Blue Note
- Website: davemcmurray.com

Dave McMurray (born 1958) is an American jazz musician. His primary instrument is saxophone.

== Early life and education ==
McMurray was born in Detroit, Michigan, and grew up on the eastside of the city. The son of a working-class family, he received a scholarship through Horizons Upward Bound to attend high school at Cranbrook Schools in Bloomfield Hills, Michigan.

After graduating from Wayne State University with a degree in Urban Studies and Psychology, McMurray began working as a mental health professional.

== Career ==
McMurray’s first real road gig was with Blues Master Albert King. Upon returning he started his own group ‘Midnight Sky’ and also was a member of the avant-garde jazz ensemble, Griot Galaxy. McMurray joined the pop rock group Was (Not Was) at its inception, and subsequently contributed to all of their albums.

McMurray has had an extensive career as a session musician. Throughout the 1980s and 1990s, he played on albums for many classic rock and blues acts, ranging from The Rolling Stones to Bob Dylan. His first solo album, The Secret Life, was released on Timeless Records in 1989. He then was signed to Warner Bros. Records for his follow up album, 1996’s The David McMurray Show. In 2018, McMurray released Music Is Life, his Blue Note Records debut, a collection of original compositions and recognizable covers.

From 2008-2016 McMurray was the saxophonist in Kid Rock's Twisted Brown Trucker Band. In 2019, McMurray performed with Bob Weir at the Hardly Strictly Bluegrass Festival in San Francisco, the first time he was exposed to the music of the Grateful Dead. He then recorded Grateful Deadication, an album of jazz interpretations of the band’s songbook. It features appearances by Bob Weir, Bettye Lavette, and Herschel Boone. McMurray is backed on the album by bassist Ibrahim Jones, drummer Jeff Canady, guitarist Wayne Gerard, and keyboardist Maurice O’Neal. Blue Note released Grateful Deadication in July 2021.

McMurray released Grateful Deadication 2, "the follow-up to his 2021 tribute album," on May 19, 2023. The album features his own Detroit-based band and special guests Jamey Johnson, Oteil Burbridge, Bob James, and Don Was.

== Personal life ==
McMurray lives in Detroit with his wife, Garzelle. They have one daughter.

== Discography ==
=== As leader ===
- The Secret Life (Timeless, 1989)
- The Dave McMurray Show (Warner Bros., 1996)
- Peace of Mind (Hip Bop, 1999)
- Soul Searching (Hip Bop, 2001)
- Nu Life Stories (Hip Bop, 2003)
- Music Is Life (Blue Note, 2018)
- Grateful Deadication (Blue Note, 2021)
- Grateful Deadication 2 (Blue Note, 2023)

With Griot Galaxy

- Kins (Black & White, 1982)
- Live at the D.I.A. (Entropy, 2003)

With Was (Not Was)

- Was (Not Was) (Island/ZE, 1981)
- Born to Laugh at Tornadoes (Geffen, 1983)
- What Up, Dog? (Fontana, 1988)
- Are You Okay? (Chrysalis, 1990)
- Hello Dad... I'm in Jail (Fontana, 1992)
- Boo! (Rykodisc, 2008)

=== As sideman ===
With Bob James

- Joy Ride (Warner Bros., 1999)
- Morning, Noon & Night (Warner Bros., 2002)
- Urban Flamingo (Koch, 2006)

With Kem

- Kemistry (Motown, 2003)
- Album II (Motown, 2005)
- Intimacy Universal (Motown, 2010)
- What Christmas Means (Motown, 2013)

With Kid Rock

- Kid Rock (Atlantic/Lava/Top Dog, 2003)
- Rock n Roll Jesus (Atlantic/Top Dog, 2007)
- Rebel Soul (Atlantic/Top Dog, 2012)
- First Kiss (Warner Bros., 2015)

With Millie Scott

- Ev'ry Little Bit (4th & Broadway, 1987)
- Love Me Right (4th & Broadway, 1987)
- I Can Make It Good for You (4th & Broadway, 1988)

With others

- Geri Allen, Open On All Sides in the Middle (Minor Music, 1987)
- Geri Allen, Grand River Crossings (Motema, 2013)
- Gerald Alston, 1st Class Only (Street Life/Scotti Bros. 1994)
- Sweet Pea Atkinson, Don't Walk Away (Island/ZE, 1982)
- The B-52's, Good Stuff (Reprise, 1992)
- Bobby Barth, Two Hearts One Beat (Atco, 1986)
- Big Chief, Mack Avenue Skullgame (Sub Pop, 1993)
- Big Chief, One Born Every Minute (Sub Pop, 1993)
- Tim Bowman, Paradise (Insync Music, 1998)
- Tim Bowman, Smile (Trippin 'n' Rhythm, 2008)
- Johnny Bristol, Come to Me (Bushka, 1994)
- Felix Cavaliere, Dreams in Motion (MCA, 1994)
- Bootsy Collins, Ultra Wave (Warner Bros., 1980)
- Commissioned, Will You Be Ready? (Light, 1988)
- Randy Crawford, Through the Eyes of Love (Warner Bros., 1992)
- Cristina, Sleep It Off (P-Vine, 2004)
- Thornetta Davis, Shout Out (Sub Pop, 1994)
- Gene Dunlap, Party in Me (Capitol, 1981)
- Gene Dunlap, It's Just the Way I Feel (Capitol, 2011)
- Bob Dylan, Under the Red Sky (Columbia, 1990)
- Floy Joy, Into the Hot (Virgin, 1984)
- Floy Joy, Weak in the Presence of Beauty (Virgin, 1986)
- Godmoma, Here (Elektra, 1981)
- Randy Hall, Robert Irving III, Adam Holzman, ESP 2: A Tribute to Miles (TDK, 2001)
- Ofra Haza, Kirya (EastWest, 1992)
- Jennifer Holliday, I'm On Your Side (Arista, 1991)
- Iggy Pop, Brick by Brick (Virgin, 1990)
- Jose James, Lean On Me (Blue Note, 2018)
- B.B. King, King of the Blues (MCA, 1992)
- Gladys Knight, Good Woman (MCA, 1991)
- Wayne Kramer, Dangerous Madness (Epitaph, 1996)
- David Lasley, Raindance (EMI, 1984)
- Larry McCray, Ambition (Virgin, 1990)
- Tina Moore, Tina Moore Attic (SBD, 1995)
- Darrell Nulisch, Bluesoul (Higher Plane, 1996)
- One Be Lo, The R.E.B.I.R.T.H. (Subterraneous, 2007)
- Orquestra Was, Forever's a Long, Long Time (Verve Forecast, 1997)
- David Peaston, Introducing... (Geffen, 1989)
- David Peaston, Mixed Emotions (MCA, 1991)
- Louis Price, Louis Price (Motown, 1991)
- R. J.'s Latest Arrival, Tangled in Love (EMI, 1989)
- R. J.'s Latest Arrival, Truly Yours (EMI, 1988)
- The Rolling Stones, Voodoo Lounge (Virgin, 1994)
- Mitch Ryder, Like a Rolling Stone (Personal, 1985)
- John Sinclair, Mobile Homeland (Amazon.com, 2017)
- Keith Staten, From the Heart (FIXIT, 1990)
- The Temptations, Awesome (Motown, 2001)
- Helen Terry, Blue Notes (Virgin, 1986)
- Don Was, Backbeat (Virgin, 1994)
- Thomas Whitfield, Alive and Satisfied (Benson Music, 1992)
- Brian Wilson, I Just Wasn't Made for These Times (MCA, 1995)
- Nancy Wilson, If I Had My Way (Columbia, 1997)
- The Winans, All Out (Qwest/Warner Bros., 1993)
