= Double Wide (album) =

Studio album by Uncle Kracker
- Released: May 30, 2000
- Genre: Rap rock; country
- Length: 44:15
- Label: Lava; Atlantic; Top Dog
- Producer: Kid Rock; Michael Bradford

Uncle Kracker chronology
Double Wide (2000)	No Stranger to Shame (2002)

Singles from Double Wide
- 1. "Follow Me" Released: November 6, 2000; 2. "Yeah, Yeah, Yeah" Released: 2001

Professional ratings
Review scores
Source	Rating
AllMusic	3.5/5 stars
Robert Christgau	(neither)
Entertainment Weekly	A

Double Wide is the debut studio album by American recording artist Uncle Kracker. It was released on May 30, 2000, via Lava/Atlantic Records.

The album reached top 10 in Germany, Austria and the United States. It was certified platinum by Music Canada on August 13, 2001, and 2× Platinum by the Recording Industry Association of America on November 28, 2001. Regarding the album's success, Kracker stated in 2001 "It gives you that kind of 'I told you so' feeling, because I always knew the record was good."

== Background ==
The recording sessions took place on the back of a tour bus parked in various motels and arena parking lots across the country. The production was mostly handled by Kid Rock with Michael Bradford. The music of the album is noted for its eclectic style, categorized by AllMusic as country, rock rap and rockabilly. Additionally, the album also incorporates elements of hip hop, rock and roll, blues rock and pop. The album was nearly named Rednecks, Tan Lines, and Blue Balls before being renamed to Double Wide.

== Track listing ==
All songs co-written by Robert J. Ritchie and Matthew Shafer, unless noted.

1. "Intro" – 1:19
2. "Better Days" (Kenny Olson, James Trombly, Robert J. Ritchie, Matthew Shafer) – 4:50
3. "What 'Chu Lookin' At?" – 5:12
4. "Follow Me" (Michael Bradford, Shafer) – 3:35
5. "Heaven" (featuring Paradime and Kid Rock) (Freddie Beauregard, William Maddox, David Moore, Ritchie, Shafer) – 4:19
6. "Steaks 'n Shrimp" – 4:13
7. "Who's Your Uncle?" (Beauregard, Ritchie, Shafer) – 3:56
8. "Whiskey and Water" (Bradford, Ritchie, Shafer) – 4:43
9. "Yeah, Yeah, Yeah" (Ritchie, Shafer, Trombly) – 4:59
10. "Aces & 8's" (Martin Gross, Bradford, Shafer) – 3:53
11. "You Can't Take Me" (Bradford, Shafer, Trombly) – 3:16

== Personnel ==
- Uncle Kracker – lead vocals, DJ
- Kid Rock – guitar, scratching, drums, programming, background vocals, lead vocals on "Heaven"
- Paradime – lead vocals on "Heaven"
- James Montgomery – blues harmonica
- Michael Bradford – bass guitar, guitar, programming, background vocals
- James Bones – keyboards, background vocals
- Stefanie Eulinberg – drums
- Jason Krause – guitar
- Kenny Olson – guitar
- Lynn Owsley – pedal steel guitar

== Charts ==
=== Weekly charts ===
Chart (2000–2001)	Peak position
Australian Albums (ARIA)	15
Austrian Albums (Ö3 Austria)	5
German Albums (Offizielle Top 100)	3
New Zealand Albums (RMNZ)	21
Norwegian Albums (VG-lista)	26
Swedish Albums (Sverigetopplistan)	16
Swiss Albums (Schweizer Hitparade)	13
UK Albums (OCC)	40
US Billboard 200	7

=== Year-end charts ===
Chart (2001)	Position
Canadian Albums (Nielsen SoundScan)	97
US Billboard 200	53
Worldwide Albums (IFPI)	50

== Certifications ==
Certifications for Double Wide
Region	Certification	Certified units/sales
Australia (ARIA)	Gold	35,000^{^}
Canada (Music Canada)	Platinum	100,000^{^}
United States (RIAA)	2× Platinum	2,000,000^{^}
^{^} Shipments figures based on certification alone.
