= First Kiss (Kid Rock album) =

Studio album by Kid Rock
- Released: February 24, 2015
- Recorded: 2014
- Studios: The Allen Roadhouse (Clarkston, Michigan); Blackbird (Nashville, Tennessee)
- Genres: Blues; country; country rock; rock and roll; swamp rock
- Length: 44:44
- Labels: Warner Bros.; Top Dog
- Producers: Kid Rock; Dann Huff

Kid Rock chronology
Rebel Soul (2012)	First Kiss (2015)	Sweet Southern Sugar (2017)

Singles from First Kiss
- 1. "First Kiss" Released: January 6, 2015

First Kiss is the tenth studio album by American singer and songwriter Kid Rock. The album was released on February 24, 2015 through Warner Bros. Records and Top Dog Records; it is his first and only with Warner Bros. after leaving sister label Atlantic Records in 2014.

== Critical reception ==
Professional ratings
Aggregate scores
Source	Rating
Metacritic	61/100
Review scores
Source	Rating
AllMusic	3.5/5 stars
Billboard	3.5/5 stars
Entertainment Weekly	B
Evening Standard	3/5 stars
The Guardian	1/5 stars
Kerrang!	2/5 stars
The Music	2.5/5 stars
New York Daily News	2/5 stars
Q	3/5 stars
Rolling Stone	4/5 stars

According to the review aggregator Metacritic, First Kiss received "generally favorable reviews" based on a weighted average score of 61 out of 100 from 9 critic scores. Stephen Thomas Erlewine of AllMusic said, "It's a bit bumpy and sometimes sleepy but it finds old Bob Ritchie settling into his comfort zone, knowing that he's in it for the long haul." Anthony DeCurtis of Rolling Stone said, "First Kiss presents few surprises, mostly because Kid Rock's journey from abrasive rap metal to unreconstructed heartland rock has landed him in a sweet spot: big guitars, big drums, big choruses and gravelly vocals." Richard Bienstock of Billboard said, "First Kiss is hardly his most adventurous project, but it is perhaps his most easygoing, tuneful one. The production is crisp and clean, the guitars are sparkling, the vibe is rollicking but relaxed. He sounds better here than he has in a long time."

== Commercial performance ==
The album debuted at number two on the Billboard 200, with sales of 137,000 copies in the United States. As of December 2015, First Kiss has sold more than 354,000 copies in the United States. The album also debuted at number two in Canada on the Canadian Albums Chart, with sales of 8,000.

== Track listing ==
All songs were produced by Kid Rock, except "First Kiss" and "Drinking Beer With Dad" were produced by Kid Rock and Dan Huff.

No.	Title	Writer(s)	Length
1.	"First Kiss"	Kid Rock, Marlon Young	4:40
2.	"Good Times, Cheap Wine"	Rock, Young	4:37
3.	"Johnny Cash"	Rock	4:41
4.	"Ain't Enough Whiskey"	Rock, Young	3:37
5.	"Drinking Beer with Dad"	Rock	4:38
6.	"Good Time Lookin' for Me"	Rock, Young	4:33
7.	"Best of Me"	Rock, Young	4:48
8.	"One More Song"	Rock	4:26
9.	"Jesus and Bocephus"	Rock, Jeff Orr	3:51
10.	"FOAD"	Rock, Ed Jurdi, Gordy Quist	4:53

Clean edition
No.	Title	Writer(s)	Length
10.	"Say Goodbye" (reworked version of "FOAD" co-written by Bob Seger)	Rock, Ed Jurdi, Gordy Quist	4:53

== Personnel ==
=== Kid Rock ===
- Robert James Ritchie Sr. - drum programming, drums, acoustic guitar, electric guitar, keyboards, percussion, piano, shaker, synthesizer, tambourine, Turntables, background vocals, wah wah guitar

=== Additional personnel ===
==== Hornists ====
- Rayse Biggs - horns
- Dave McMurray - horns

==== Backing vocalists ====
- Barbara Payton - background vocals
- Herschel Boone - background vocals
- Jessica Wagner-Cowan - background vocals
- Laura Creamer - background vocals
- Russell Terrell - background vocals
- Shannon Curfman - background vocals
- Shaun Murphy - background vocals
- Stacy Michelle - background vocals

==== Drummers ====
- Dorian Crozier
- Richard Millsap

==== Others ====
- Jimmie Bones - piano, background vocals
- Rob Mathes - conductor, string arrangements
- Larry Franklin - fiddle
- David Huff - drum programming
- Marlon Young - bass guitar, acoustic guitar, electric guitar

==== Guitarists ====
- Dan Dugmore - steel guitar
- Dann Huff - acoustic guitar, electric guitar, mandolin
- Ed Jurdi - electric guitar, slide guitar
- Gordy Quist - electric guitar
- Adam Shoenfeld - electric guitar
- Nathan Young - electric guitar

==== Pianists ====
- Charlie Judge - accordion, organ, piano
- Trevor Nealon - organ, piano, electric piano

==== Violists ====
- Vivek Kamath - viola
- Shmuel Katz
- Remi Pelletier

==== Violinists ====
- Larry Frautchi - violin
- Lisa Kim - violin
- Hyunju Lee - violin
- Liz Kim - violin
- Joanna Maurer - violin
- Annaliesa Place - violin
- Sharon Yamada - violin
- Jung Sun Yoo - violin
- Suzanne Ornstein - violin
- David Southern - violin

==== Cellists ====
- Mihai Marica - cello
- Alan Stepansky - cello
- Wendy Sutter - cello

==== Bassists ====
- Jimmie Lee Sloas - bass guitar
- Darrel "Peanut" Smith - bass guitar

== Charts ==
=== Weekly charts ===
Chart (2015)	Peak position
Australian Albums (ARIA)	45
Austrian Albums (Ö3 Austria)	9
Canadian Albums (Billboard)	2
German Albums (Offizielle Top 100)	16
Hungarian Albums (MAHASZ)	12
Scottish Albums (Official Charts)	46
Swiss Albums (Schweizer Hitparade)	5
UK Albums (Official Charts)	52
UK Album Downloads (Official Charts)	64
US Billboard 200	2
US Top Rock Albums (Billboard)	1

=== Year-end charts ===
Chart (2015)	Position
US Billboard 200	80
US Top Rock Albums (Billboard)	8
