= First Kiss (Kid Rock song) =

Single by Kid Rock

from the album First Kiss
- Released: January 6, 2015
- Recorded: 2014
- Genre: Southern rock; pop rock
- Length: 4:40
- Label: Warner Bros., Top Dog
- Songwriters: R. J. Ritchie, Marlon Young
- Producers: Kid Rock, Dann Huff

Kid Rock singles chronology
"Rebel Soul" (2013)	"First Kiss" (2015)	"Po-Dunk" (2017)

Music video
- "First Kiss" on YouTube

"First Kiss" is a song by American singer-songwriter Kid Rock from his tenth studio album, First Kiss (2015). Written by Kid Rock and Marlon Young, and produced by Kid Rock and Dann Huff, the song was first released to digital retailers on January 6, 2015 as the lead single from the album of the same name. The song recalls a man's first kiss with his high school sweetheart, who remains by his side to this day. Critics noted the song's inspiration from Bryan Adams' 1985 hit, "Summer of '69." Though both "First Kiss" and "Summer Of 69" use the same chord structure of 38 Special's "Hold On Loosely."

The song achieved moderate commercial success, being Kid Rock's first Billboard Hot 100 hit since "All Summer Long" in 2008 and so far reaching a peak position of 66 on that chart. A crossover success, "First Kiss" has impacted multiple pop and rock charts, and was later sent to country radio.

== Track listings ==
Digital download – single

1. First Kiss – 4:40

US CD single

1. First Kiss – 4:40
2. Jesus And Bocephus – 3:51
3. Wasting Time (2013 Funky Country Mix) – 4:43

== Chart performance ==
=== Weekly charts ===
Chart (2015)	Peak position
Canada Hot 100 (Billboard)	71
Canada AC (Billboard)	41
Canada Rock (Billboard)	31
US Billboard Hot 100	66
US Adult Contemporary (Billboard)	27
US Adult Pop Airplay (Billboard)	29
US Country Airplay (Billboard)	56
US Hot Rock & Alternative Songs (Billboard)	6
US Rock & Alternative Airplay (Billboard)	34

=== Year-end charts ===
Chart (2015)	Position
US Hot Rock Songs (Billboard)	52

== Release history ==
Country	Date	Format	Label	Ref.
United States	January 6, 2015	Digital download	Warner Bros. Records	
United States	January 27, 2015	CD single	Warner Bros. Records	
United States	April 27, 2015	Country radio	Warner Bros. Records / WEA	
