= Monster Truck (band) =

Canadian rock band

- Origin: Hamilton, Ontario, Canada
- Genres: Hard rock; blues rock
- Years active: 2009–present
- Labels: Dine Alone; Mascot
- Members: Brandon Bliss; Jeremy Widerman
- Past members: Steve Kiely: Jon Harvey
- Website: ilovemonstertruck.com

Monster Truck is a Canadian rock band from Hamilton, Ontario. Members include guitarist Jeremy Widerman, and keyboardist Brandon Bliss.

== History ==
Monster Truck's 2011 EP The Brown EP found success for them in Canada. The single "Seven Seas Blues" charted in the top ten of both the active rock airplay chart and the alternative rock airplay chart in the spring of 2012. After the release of two EPs, their debut album Furiosity was released on Dine Alone Records on May 28, 2013 and distributed on Universal. The band's second studio album entitled Sittin' Heavy was released on Mascot Records on February 19, 2016.

The band won the 2013 Juno Award for Breakthrough Group of the Year. They played the Download Festival in 2013 and supported Vista Chino on their European tour in October and November 2013. The band started recording the Sittin' Heavy album in January 2015 after touring with Alice in Chains, opening for them on their 2014 North American tour.

Their track "Sweet Mountain River" was included in Ubisoft's music game Rocksmith 2014, "Seven Seas Blues" in EA Sports' NHL 13, and "Old Train" was used in an episode of Orphan Black, "Variable and Full of Perturbation". The first single from their second studio album was released on October 19, 2015, a track called "Don't Tell Me How to Live". A song, "The Enforcer", was also available only when pre-ordering the album. Their song "Righteous Smoke" is featured in EA Sports' NHL 17. The song "The Enforcer" was also used as the goal song for the Toronto Maple Leafs after every goal scored with a "Go Leafs Go" chant added to the song.

The band's third studio album, True Rockers, was announced on June 1, 2018, upon the release of the lead single "Evolution". The title track featuring Dee Snider was released as a promotional single the following week. The album was released on September 14, 2018.

In November 2021, Monster Truck was featured in Kid Rock's re-recording of their song "Don't Tell Me How To Live", released as the first single from Kid Rock's triple album. Kid Rock's recording features a rap rock sound. On March 14, 2022, it was announced that drummer Steve Kiely had departed from the band.

On September 30, 2022, the band released their fourth studio album, Warriors.

Jon Harvey parted ways with the band in June 2024.

== Band members ==
Current

- Brandon Bliss – keyboards (2009–present)
- Jeremy Widerman – guitars (2009–present)

Former

- Steve Kiely – drums (2009–2022)
- Jon Harvey – bass, vocals (2009–2024)

Live

- Theo McKibbon – drums (2022–2023)

== Discography ==
=== Studio albums ===
Title	Details	Peak chart positions			
Title	Details	CAN	AUT	GER	SWI
Furiosity	Release date: June 25, 2013; Label: Dine Alone; Formats: CD, digital download, 12" vinyl	13	—	—	—
Sittin' Heavy	Release date: February 19, 2016; Label: Dine Alone, Mascot Label Group; Formats: CD, digital download, 12" vinyl	6	42	52	64
True Rockers	Release date: September 14, 2018; Label: Dine Alone, Mascot Label Group; Formats: CD, digital download, 12" vinyl	91	—	96	50
Warriors	Release date: September 30, 2022; Label: BMG; Formats: CD, digital download, 12" vinyl	—	—	—	—
Monster Truck	Release date: 2027 Label: TBA Formats: CD, digit download				

=== EPs ===
- 2010: Monster Truck
- 2011: The Brown EP
- 2025: Monster Truck Mondays Vol 1
- 2025: Monster Truck Mondays Vol 2
- 2025: Monster Truck Monsters Vol 3

=== Singles ===
Year	Song	Chart Positions			Album
Year	Song	CAN	CAN Rock	US Main.	Album
2011	"Sworded Beest"	—	—	—	The Brown EP
2011	"Seven Seas Blues"	—	7	—	The Brown EP
2012	"Righteous Smoke"	—	11	—	The Brown EP
2013	"Sweet Mountain River"	84	1	—	Furiosity
2013	"The Lion"	—	2	—	Furiosity
2014	"Old Train"	—	7	—	Furiosity
2015	"Don't Tell Me How to Live"	—	8	27	Sittin' Heavy
2016	"For the People"	—	6	—	Sittin' Heavy
2016	"The Enforcer"	—	22	—	Sittin' Heavy
2020	"love Become law"				non album single
2022	"Golden Woman"	—	—	—	Warriors
2022	"Get My Things and Go"	—	—	—	Warriors
2018	"Evolution"	—	14	—	True Rockers
2024	"Murder One"	-			non album single
