= Twisted Brown Trucker =

American rock band

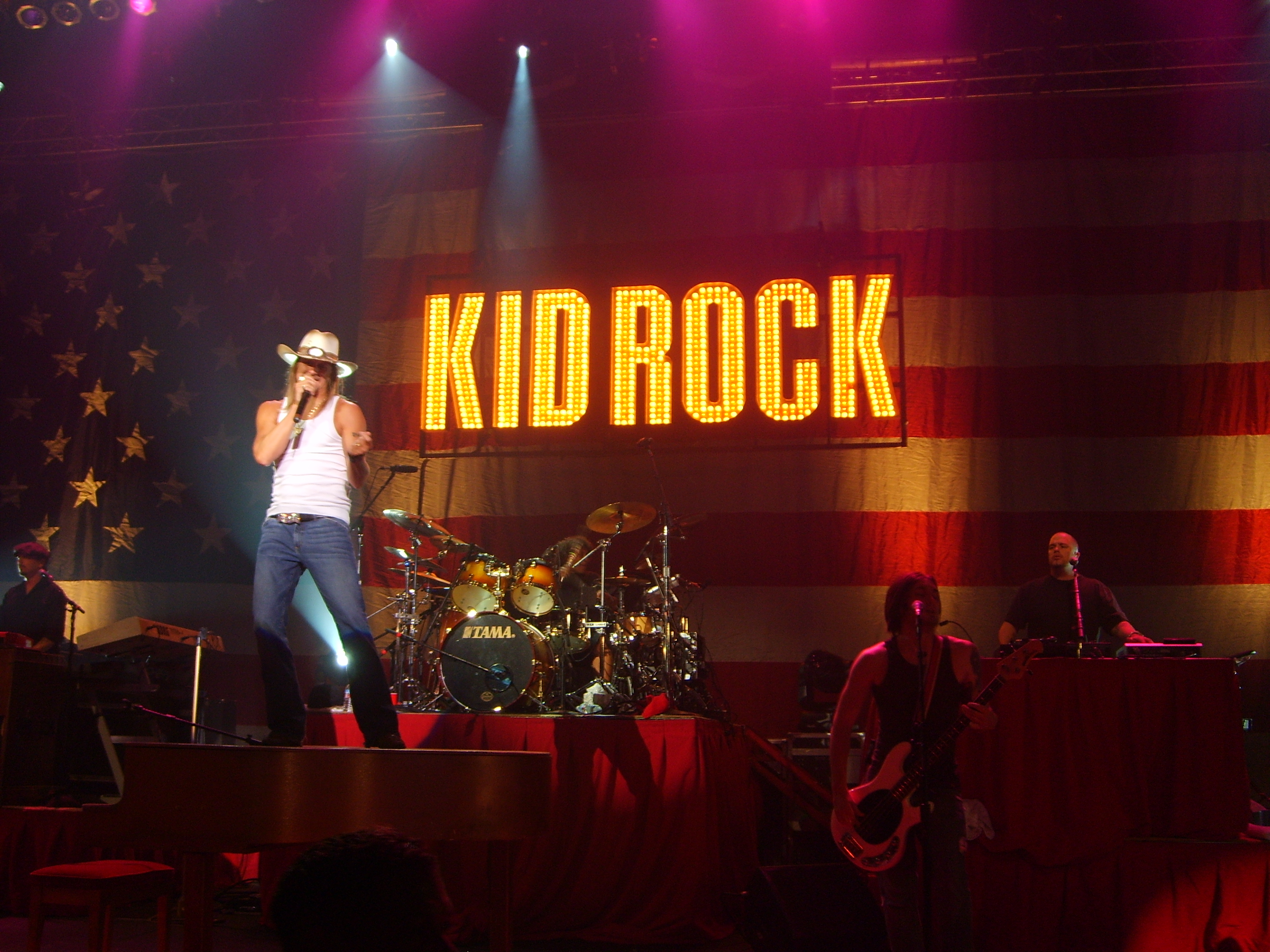
- Twisted Brown Trucker performing in 2006

Background information
- Also known as: The Twisted Brown Trucker Band
- Origin: Detroit, Michigan, U.S.
- Genres: Rock; country; hip-hop; heavy metal
- Years active: 1994–2010; 2012–present
- Label: Top Dog
- Members: See members

Twisted Brown Trucker is the backing band for American musician Kid Rock. Formed in 1994, the band has contributed to nine of his twelve studio albums, as well as Uncle Kracker's Double Wide album.

== History ==
=== Formation and establishment (1994–1996) ===
By 1994, Kid Rock's live performances had mostly been backed by DJs Blackman and Uncle Kracker, but Kid Rock soon began to utilize more and more live instrumentation into his performances, and formed the rock band Twisted Brown Trucker.

Through extensive promoting, including distributing tapes on consignment to local stores and giving away free samplers of his music, the band developed a following among an audience which DJ Uncle Kracker described as "white kids who dropped acid and liked listening to gangsta rap"; this following included local rapper Joe C., who had been attending the band's concerts as a fan, but upon meeting Kid Rock, was invited to perform on stage as Kid Rock's hype man. Joe C, who stood 3 feet and 9 inches, became noted for his "dynamic, popular, dirty-mouthed presence"; in a radio interview, Ted Nugent publicly condemned Kid Rock for letting Joe C perform at his concerts, as Nugent believed that Joe C was a 6-year-old child, when in fact Joe C was an adult whose growth had been stunted by celiac disease.

=== Early Mornin' Stoned Pimp and local breakthrough (1996) ===
The band's stage presence became honed with the addition of a light show, pyrotechnics, dancers and a light-up backdrop bearing the name "Kid Rock", and 1996 saw the release of his most rock-oriented album to date, Early Mornin' Stoned Pimp, which Twisted Brown Trucker performed on. According to Kid Rock, who distributed the album himself, Early Mornin' Stoned Pimp sold 14,000 copies.

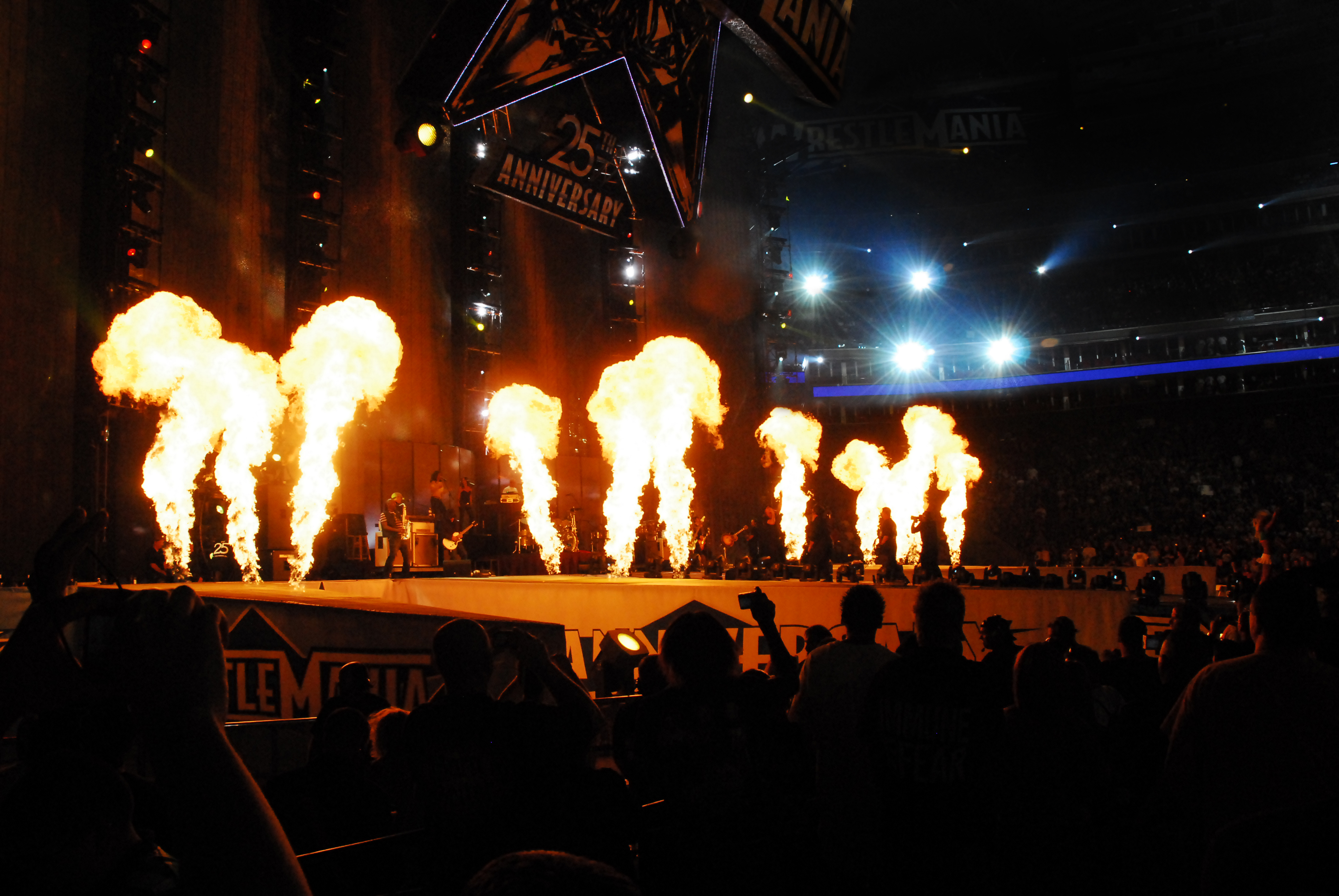
A display of pyrotechnics during one of Twisted Brown Trucker's performances. Their stage presence helped increase the band's local following in Detroit in the mid-1990s.

The year also saw the stabilization of Twisted Brown Trucker with its final lineup, consisting of Detroit musicians Kenny Olson and Jason Krause on guitars, keyboardist Jimmie "Bones" Trombly, drummer Stefanie Eulinberg, DJ/turntablist Uncle Kracker, and backing vocalists Misty Love and Shirley Hayden.

Kid Rock developed his stage persona, performing dressed in 1970s pimp clothing with a real, possibly loaded, gun down the front of his pants.

=== Signing with Atlantic Records, Devil Without a Cause, national success and Joe C.'s death (1997–1998) ===
Kid Rock's attorney, Tommy Valentino, increased his stature by helping him get articles written about Kid Rock and Twisted Brown Trucker in major publications, including the Beastie Boys' Grand Royal magazine, but though his management tried to interest local record labels in his music, they told his management team that they were not interested in signing a white rapper, to which Valentino told them, "He's not a white rapper. He's a rock star and everything in between."

In 1997, Jason Flom, head of Lava Records, attended one of the band's performances, and met with Kid Rock, who later gave him a demo containing the songs "Somebody's Gotta Feel This" and "I Got One for Ya", which led to Kid Rock signing with Atlantic Records. As part of his recording deal, Kid Rock received $150,000 from the label.

By this time, Kid Rock had fully developed his stage persona and musical style and wanted to make a "redneck, shit-kicking rock 'n' roll rap" album, resulting in his fourth studio album, Devil Without a Cause, recorded with the band at the White Room in Detroit and mixed at the Mix Room in Los Angeles; Uncle Kracker helped Kid Rock write some of the songs, and Eminem performed a guest verse on the song "Fuck Off".

Through extensive promoting, including appearances on MTV (including a performance alongside Aerosmith and Run-DMC) and performing at Woodstock 1999, Devil Without a Cause sold 14 million copies, the album's success spurred by Kid Rock's breakthrough hit single "Bawitdaba".

By April 1999, the album was certified gold, and the following month it was certified platinum, a certification the album received 12 times.

On November 16, 2000, Joe C. died due to complications from celiac disease, a condition that he had been diagnosed with for his entire life.

=== Continued success and shift away from hip hop (2000–2008) ===
In 2000, Twisted Brown Trucker served as the backing band for Uncle Kracker's debut solo album Double Wide. On September 8, 2001, Twisted Brown Trucker guitarist Kenny Olson performed alongside Jimi Hendrix's post-1969 rhythm section, the Band of Gypsys, in a tribute to Hendrix. In November, Twisted Brown Trucker performed on Kid Rock's fifth studio album, Cocky. The album became a hit, spurred by the crossover success of the single "Picture", a country ballad featuring Sheryl Crow which introduced Kid Rock to a wider audience and was ultimately the most successful single on the album.

In support of the album, Kid Rock and Twisted Brown Trucker performed on the American Bad Ass Tour in 2001, supported by country singer David Allan Coe as an opening act. The same year, Twisted Brown Trucker began displaying the Confederate flag during their live performances; in a 2002 interview with the Detroit Free Press, Kid Rock defended the band's use of the flag, saying that it was a symbol of Southern rock and rebellion. During this period, Uncle Kracker began his solo career, leaving Twisted Brown Trucker.

2003 saw the release of Kid Rock's self-titled sixth album with Twisted Brown Trucker backing him, which shifted his music further away from hip hop; the lead single was a cover of Bad Company's "Feel Like Makin' Love".

In 2004, the band performed at the Super Bowl, in a controversial appearance that spurred criticism from Veterans of Foreign Wars and Senator Zell Miller for Kid Rock wearing the American flag with one slit in the middle, as a poncho; Kid Rock was accused of "desecrating" the flag. Also that year, the band's guitarist, Kenny Olson, performed on the Jimi Hendrix tribute album Power of Soul.

In 2006, Twisted Brown Trucker stopped displaying the Confederate flag at his concerts. The following year, Kid Rock released his seventh studio album, Rock N Roll Jesus, which was his first release to chart at #1 on the Billboard 200, selling 172,000 copies in its first week and going on to sell over 5 million copies. The album's third single, "All Summer Long", became a global hit, utilizing a mash up of Lynyrd Skynyrd's "Sweet Home Alabama" and Warren Zevon's "Werewolves of London".

In 2008, Kid Rock and Twisted Brown Trucker recorded and made a music video for the song "Warrior" for a National Guard advertising campaign.

Kid Rock chose not to record with Twisted Brown Trucker on his 2010 album Born Free, which was recorded with session musicians.

=== Reunion, Rebel Soul, First Kiss and Sweet Southern Sugar (2012 onward) ===
After a hiatus, Twisted Brown Trucker resumed playing with Kid Rock, starting with 2012's Rebel Soul; Kid Rock said that he wanted the album to feel like a greatest hits album, but with new songs.

In 2013, Twisted Brown Trucker performed on the "Best Night Ever" tour, where Kid Rock motioned to charge no more than $20 for his tickets. The following year, the band moved to Warner Bros. Records, releasing Kid Rock's only album on the label, First Kiss, which he self-produced. Subsequently, after leaving Warner Bros., Kid Rock signed with the country label Broken Bow Records.

In July 2017, keyboardist Jimmie Bones released his first solo album, Snakebit And Wandering. In November, Twisted Brown Trucker performed on Kid Rock's eleventh studio album, Sweet Southern Sugar.

In 2024, Jimmie Bones was diagnosed with ALS, at a concert in Anderson, South Carolina Bones with the help of Kid Rock announced his ALS publicly as they performed Drift Away.

== Musical style ==
Guitarist Jason Krause has said of Twisted Brown Trucker, "we are a country, rock, hip-hop, blues, jazz, metal band". Krause has also described Twisted Brown Trucker's music as "Run-DMC and Lynyrd Skynyrd in a blender." According to Eulinberg, she was hired "because I'm a chick drummer that can rock"; Kid Rock allegedly told her she got the job because she "doesn't play drums like a girl". Her drumming style ranges from wild hard rock and heavy metal drumming to gentler country drumming.

Kid Rock's influences include Bob Seger and the Beastie Boys. Keyboardist Jimmie Bones says his playing style was influenced by blues, R&B, garage and punk music. Drummer Stefanie Eulinberg has cited, as an influence on her playing style, Tony Thompson, Chester Thompson, Neil Peart, Dennis Chambers, and Terry Bozzio.

== Band lineup ==
=== Current members ===
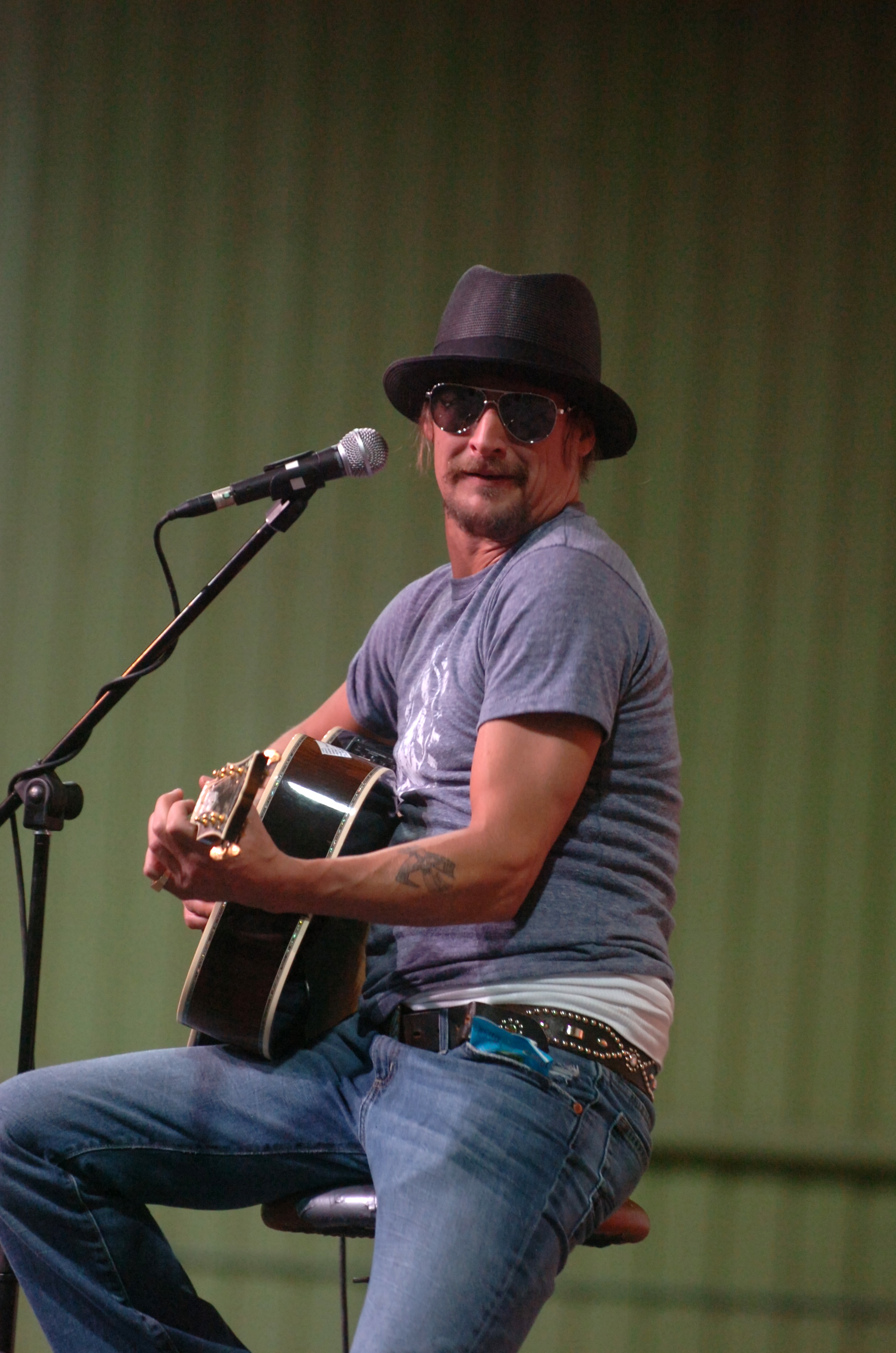
Kid Rock performing in 2007

- Kid Rock – vocals (1994–present)
- Jason Krause – guitar (1997–present)
- Dean James – keyboards (2025–present)
- Stefanie Eulinberg – drums, vocals (1997–present)
- Larry Fratangelo – percussion (2007–present)
- Marlon Young – guitar (1996–1997, 2007–present)
- Tim "Fiddleman" Watson – fiddle (2025–present)
- Aaron Julison – bass (2003–present)
- Paradime – turntables (2002–present)
- Shannon Curfman – backing vocals, acoustic guitar (2010–present)
- Kat Perkins – backing vocals (2022–present)
- Herschel Boone – backing vocals (2009–present)
- Justin Keen Patterson - backing singer, tambourine, hip hop dancer (2007-present)

=== Former members ===
- Joe C. – vocals (1994–2000, his death)
- Dave McMurray – saxophone (2008–2016)
- Johnny Evans – saxophone (2017–2019)
- Kenny Olson – lead guitar (1994–2005)
- Bobby East – bass guitar (2002–2003), lead guitar (2005)
- Kenny Trudick – lead guitar (2005–2006)
- Andy Gould – guitar (1994–1997)
- George Metropolis – bass (1994–1995)
- Ray Echlin – bass (1995–1996)
- Lynn Owsley – Steel Guitar (2002–2003)
- Lonnie Motley – bass, vocals (1996–1997)
- Michael Bradford – bass (1999–2001)
- Bob Ebeling – drums (1994–1995)
- Jimmie Bones – keyboards (1995–2025)
- Chris Zuccaro – drums (1995–1998)
- Chris Lebroux – percussion (1996–1997)
- Smith Curry – Dobro/Steel Guitar (2003–2005)
- Uncle Kracker – turntables, vocals (1994–2002)
- Money Stone – keyboards, vocals (1995–1997)
- Thornetta Davis – background vocals (1996–1997)
- Shirley Hayden – background vocals (1998–2000)
- Karen Newman – background vocals (2004–2006)
- Jessica Wagner-Cowan – background vocals (2007–2015)
- Barbara Payton – backing vocals (2007–2009, on and off)
- Stacy Michelle – backing vocals (2007–2019, on and off)
- Paul Anthony – bass (1994–1995)
- Bill Keros – drums (1995)
- Eric Hogemeyer – drums (1995)
- Jeff Hall – rhythm guitar (1995–1996)
- Misty Love – backing vocals (1998–2001)
- Lauren Creamer – backing vocals (2004–2005)

== Discography ==
- Kid Rock - Early Mornin' Stoned Pimp (1996)
- Kid Rock - Devil Without a Cause (1998)
- Uncle Kracker - Double Wide (2000)
- Kid Rock - Cocky (2001)
- Kid Rock - Kid Rock (2003)
- Kid Rock - Live Trucker (2006)
- Kid Rock - Rock n Roll Jesus (2007)
- Kid Rock - Rebel Soul (2012)
- Kid Rock - First Kiss (2015)
- Kid Rock - Sweet Southern Sugar (2017)
- Kid Rock - Bad Reputation (2022)
