= Terence Trent D'Arby discography =

- Studio albums: 13
- EPs: 3
- Live albums: 7
- Compilation albums: 4
- Singles: 31

American singer Terence Trent D'Arby has released 13 studio albums, four greatest hits compilation albums, four live albums, one extended play, and 31 singles. D'Arby has earned one platinum album. His début album Introducing the Hardline According to Terence Trent D'Arby (1987) peaked at number 4 in the US, and while receiving positive reviews, it became a huge success in Europe. The album featured the number 1 single "Wishing Well", which sold over 500,000 copies and was certified gold by the Recording Industry Association of America. Follow up albums were less successful. After Columbia Records parted ways with the artist in the mid-1990s, D'Arby later changed his stage name to Sananda Maitreya. He went on to release 9 studio albums, and 7 live albums, under his own independent record label TreeHouse Publishing.

== Albums ==
=== Studio albums ===
Title	Album details	Peak chart positions										Certifications
Title	Album details	US	US R&B	AUS	AUT	NLD	NOR	NZ	SWE	SWI	UK	Certifications
Introducing the Hardline According to Terence Trent D'Arby	Released: July 13, 1987; Label: Columbia; Formats: LP, cassette, CD, digital download	4	1	1	4	2	4	2	5	1	1	RIAA: 2× Platinum; BPI: 5× Platinum; IFPI SWI: Gold; MC: 2× Platinum
Neither Fish nor Flesh	Released: October 23, 1989; Label: Columbia; Formats: LP, cassette, CD, digital download	61	75	40	28	32	16	42	47	20	12	BPI: Gold; MC: Gold
Symphony or Damn	Released: May 11, 1993; Label: Columbia; Formats: LP, cassette, CD, digital download	119	—	8	38	51	—	14	28	23	8	BPI: Gold
Vibrator	Released: April 18, 1995; Label: Columbia; Formats: LP, cassette, CD, digital download	178	—	—	—	27	—	32	—	8	11	
Wildcard	Released: October 11, 2001; Label: Rock Up / Treehouse Publishing; Formats: CD, digital download	—	—	—	—	—	—	—	—	—	—	
Angels & Vampires – Volume I	Released: October 8, 2005; Label: Treehouse Publishing; Formats: CD, digital download	—	—	—	—	—	—	—	—	—	—	
Angels & Vampires – Volume II	Released: April 29, 2006; Label: Treehouse Publishing; Formats: CD, digital download	—	—	—	—	—	—	—	—	—	—	
Nigor Mortis	Released: May 20, 2009; Label: Treehouse Publishing; Formats: CD, digital download	—	—	—	—	—	—	—	—	—	—	
The Sphinx	Released: March 15, 2011; Label: Treehouse Publishing; Formats: CD, digital download	—	—	—	—	—	—	—	—	—	—	
Return to Zooathalon	Released: March 1, 2013; Label: Treehouse Publishing; Formats: CD, digital download	—	—	—	—	—	—	—	—	—	—	
The Rise of the Zugebrian Time Lords	Released: October 9, 2015; Label: Treehouse Publishing; Formats: CD, digital download	—	—	—	—	—	—	—	—	—	—	
Prometheus & Pandora	Released: October 12, 2017; Label: Treehouse Publishing; Formats: CD, digital download	—	—	—	—	—	—	—	—	—	—	
Pandora's PlayHouse	Released: March 15, 2021; Label: Treehouse Publishing; Formats: CD, digital download	—	—	—	—	—	—	—	—	—	—	
The Pegasus Project: Pegasus & The Swan	Released: May 11, 2024; Label: TreeHouse Publishing; Formats: CD, digital download	—	—	—	—	—	—	—	—	—	—	
"—" denotes unknown chart positions or releases that did not chart

=== Compilation albums ===
Title	Album details	Certifications
Best Remixes	Released: October 23, 1991; Label: Columbia; Formats: CD, digital download	
Greatest Hits	Released: October 29, 2002; Label: Columbia; Formats: CD, digital download	BPI: Silver
Do You Love Me Like You Say: The Very Best of Terence Trent D'Arby	Released: January 17, 2006; Label: Columbia; Formats: CD, digital download	
Collections	Released: October 10, 2006; Label: Columbia; Formats: CD, digital download	

=== Live albums ===
Title	Album details
Live in Firenze	Released: 2007; Formats: CD, DVD
Camels at the Crossroads	Released: 2007; Formats: CD, DVD
Lovers & Fighters	Released: 2008; Formats: CD, DVD
Confessions of a Zooathaholic	Released: 2011; Formats: CD, DVD
Some Sake In Osaka!	Released: 2020; Formats: digital download
The Pegasus Project Live	Released: 1 January 2025; Label: TreeHouse Publishing; Formats: digital download, streaming
SMNUK'25 !	Released: 13 February 2026; Label: TreeHouse Publishing; Formats: digital download, streaming

== Extended plays ==
- Neon Messiah (1993)

== Singles ==
Year	Single	Peak chart positions								Certifications	Album
Year	Single	US	US R&B	US Dance	US Alt.	AUS	NLD	NZ	UK	Certifications	Album
1987	"If You Let Me Stay"	68	19	47	—	89	11	4	7		Introducing the Hardline According to Terence Trent D'Arby
1987	"Wishing Well"	1	1	7	—	9	3	4	4	RIAA: Gold	Introducing the Hardline According to Terence Trent D'Arby
1987	"Dance Little Sister"	30	9	7	—	41	3	4	20		Introducing the Hardline According to Terence Trent D'Arby
1988	"Sign Your Name"	4	2	23	—	3	2	13	2	BPI: Silver	Introducing the Hardline According to Terence Trent D'Arby
1988	"If You Let Me Stay" (Australian re-release)	—	—	—	—	36	—	—	—		Introducing the Hardline According to Terence Trent D'Arby
1988	"Rain"	—	—	—	—	—	20	—	—		Introducing the Hardline According to Terence Trent D'Arby
1989	"This Side of Love"	—	—	—	—	—	50	36	83		Neither Fish nor Flesh
1989	"To Know Someone Deeply Is to Know Someone Softly"	—	47	—	—	—	—	—	55		Neither Fish nor Flesh
1989	"The Birth of Maudie (The Incredible E.G. O'Reilly)"	—	—	—	—	—	—	—	93		Greatest Hits
1990	"Billy Don't Fall"	—	—	—	—	—	—	—	—		Neither Fish nor Flesh
1993	"Do You Love Me Like You Say?"	—	—	—	—	69	—	—	14		Symphony or Damn
1993	"She Kissed Me"	—	—	—	5	9	—	8	16		Symphony or Damn
1993	"Delicate" (featuring Des'ree)	74	—	—	—	99	45	20	14		Symphony or Damn
1993	"Let Her Down Easy"	—	—	—	—	97	—	6	18		Symphony or Damn
1993	"Turn the Page"	—	—	—	—	—	—	—	—		Symphony or Damn
1995	"Holding On to You"	—	—	—	—	—	33	12	20		Vibrator
1995	"Vibrator"	—	—	—	—	—	—	—	57		Vibrator
1995	"Supermodel Sandwich"	—	—	—	—	—	—	—	—		Vibrator
2002	"O Divina"	—	—	—	—	—	—	—	—		Wildcard
2002	"What Shall I Do"	—	—	—	—	—	—	—	—		Wildcard
2006	"Bella Faccina"	—	—	—	—	—	—	—	—		Angels & Vampires – Volume I
2007	"South Side Run"	—	—	—	—	—	—	—	—		Angels & Vampires – Volume II
2009	"Because You've Changed"	—	—	—	—	—	—	—	—		Nigor Mortis
2011	"I Saw Her"	—	—	—	—	—	—	—	—		The Sphinx
2013	"Save Me"	—	—	—	—	—	—	—	—		Return to Zooathalon
2013	"Kangaroo"	—	—	—	—	—	—	—	—		Return to Zooathalon
2015	"Giraffe"	—	—	—	—	—	—	—	—		The Rise of the Zugebrian Time Lords
2015	"Blanket on the Ground"	—	—	—	—	—	—	—	—		The Rise of the Zugebrian Time Lords
2016	"Metamorpheus"	—	—	—	—	—	—	—	—		The Rise of the Zugebrian Time Lords
2016	"Glad She's Gone"	—	—	—	—	—	—	—	—		Prometheus & Pandora
2017	"It's Been a Long Time" (featuring Luisa Corna)	—	—	—	—	—	—	—	—		Prometheus & Pandora
"—" denotes unknown chart positions or releases that did not chart

== Music videos ==
- 1987: "If You Let Me Stay"
- 1987: "Wishing Well"
- 1987: "Sign Your Name"
- 1987: "Dance Little Sister"
- 1989: "To Know Someone Deeply Is to Know Someone Softly"
- 1989: "This Side of Love"
- 1989: "Billy Don't Fall"
- 1993: "She Kissed Me"
- 1993: "Do You Love Me Like You Say?"
- 1993: "Delicate"
- 1993: "Let Her Down Easy"
- 1995: "Holding on to You"
- 1995: "Vibrator"
- 2001: "O Divina"
- 2001: "O Divina" (Japan version)
- 2005: "Bella Faccina"
- 2007: "Southside Run"
- 2013: "Kangaroo"
- 2014: "Siamo Qui"
- 2015: "Blanket on the Ground"
- 2015: "Giraffe" (lyric video)
- 2016: "Metamorpheus"
- 2016: "Glad She's Gone" (lyric video)
- 2017: "It's Been a Long Time"
- 2017: "Hail Mary"
- 2018: "The Birds Are Singing" (Pandora's Version)
- 2018: "Hail Mary" (Pandora's Version)
- 2018: "The Birds Are Singing" (Pandora's Version)
- 2018: "Hail Mary" (Pandora's Version)
- 2024: "Mr. Magoo (The Insurrection Song)"
- 2024: "The Things U Like"
- 2024: "Bondage" (lyric video)
- 2024: "Love Is Blind"
- 2026: "Life Will Go On!"
