= Greatest Hits (Terence Trent D'Arby album) =

Compilation album by Terence Trent D'Arby
- Released: 14 October 2002
- Recorded: 1986–1995
- Length: 75:04
- Language: English
- Label: Columbia
- Producers: Terence Trent D'Arby; Martyn Ware; Howard Gray

Terence Trent D'Arby chronology
| Wildcard (2001) | Greatest Hits (2002) | Angels & Vampires – Volume I (2005) |

Greatest Hits is a compilation album by Terence Trent D'Arby, released in 2002.

Two versions of the album released; A single disc edition and a double-disc edition with bonus b-sides, live tracks and remixes.

== Reception ==
Professional ratings
Review scores
| Source | Rating |
|---|---|
| AllMusic | 4/5 stars |
| Uncut | 1/5 stars |

In a review for AllMusic Andy Kellman rated the album 4 stars out of 5, noting it gave "an adequate sampling" of D'Arby's first four albums, though could have had more songs from Vibrator, which "wasn't given enough attention upon its release". The songs "Wishing Well", "Sign Your Name", "This Side of Love", "She Kissed Me" and "A Change is Gonna Come" were selected as highlights from the compilation.

Uncut magazine however had a negative view of the album, rating it only 1 star out of 5. The compilation was described as "erratic" and included "some dodgy cover versions".

== Track listing ==
Standard edition – COL 509374 2
| No. | Title | Writer(s) | Origin | Length |
|---|---|---|---|---|
| 1. | "Wishing Well" | Terence Trent D'Arby; Sean Oliver | Introducing the Hardline... | 3:54 |
| 2. | "If You Let Me Stay" | D'Arby | Introducing the Hardline... | 3:13 |
| 3. | "Dance Little Sister" | D'Arby | Introducing the Hardline... | 3:54 |
| 4. | "Sign Your Name" | D'Arby | Introducing the Hardline... | 4:36 |
| 5. | "Elevators & Hearts" | D'Arby | B-side of "Wishing Well" | 4:03 |
| 6. | "Heartbreak Hotel" | Mae Boren Axton; Elvis Presley; Tommy Durden | B-side of "Dance Little Sister" (U.K. Cassette) | 2:12 |
| 7. | "The Birth of Maudie" (The Incredible E.G. O'Reilly) | The Incredible E.G. O'Reilly | Non-album single | 2:59 |
| 8. | "This Side of Love" | D'Arby | Neither Fish nor Flesh | 5:01 |
| 9. | "To Know Someone Deeply Is to Know Someone Softly" | D'Arby | Neither Fish nor Flesh | 4:27 |
| 10. | "Billy Don't Fall" | D'Arby | Neither Fish nor Flesh | 4:19 |
| 11. | "It's Alright, Ma (I'm Only Bleeding)" | Bob Dylan | Music Of Quality and Distinction Volume 2 (British Electric Foundation album) | 3:42 |
| 12. | "Do You Love Me Like You Say?" (Edit) | D'Arby | Symphony or Damn | 3:59 |
| 13. | "Delicate" (featuring Des'ree) | D'Arby | Symphony or Damn | 4:16 |
| 14. | "She Kissed Me" | D'Arby | Symphony or Damn | 3:46 |
| 15. | "Let Her Down Easy" (Single version) | D'Arby | Symphony or Damn | 4:09 |
| 16. | "Right Thing, Wrong Way" | James Harris III; Terry Lewis; D'Arby | Beverly Hills Cop III (soundtrack) | 5:13 |
| 17. | "Holding On to You" (Edit II) | D'Arby | Vibrator | 5:03 |
| 18. | "Vibrator" (Edit I) | D'Arby | Vibrator | 4:27 |
| 19. | "A Change Is Gonna Come" (Terence Trent D'Arby and Booker T and The MG's) | Sam Cooke | The Promised Land (soundtrack) | 4:49 |
| Total length: | | | | 75:04 |

Special edition bonus disc – COL 509374 9
| No. | Title | Writer(s) | Origin | Length |
|---|---|---|---|---|
| 1. | "Wonderful World" | Sam Cooke; Lou Adler; Herb Alpert | B-side of "Wishing Well" (selected 12-inch releases) | 3:57 |
| 2. | "Under My Thumb" (Live) | Mick Jagger; Keith Richards | "Sign Your Name" 12-inch single | 4:50 |
| 3. | "Jumping Jack Flash" (Live) | Jagger; Richards | "Sign Your Name" 12-inch single | 4:17 |
| 4. | "Greasy Chicken" | D'Arby | B-side of "Sign Your Name" | 4:41 |
| 5. | "Rain" (Live) | D'Arby | "To Know Someone Deeply Is to Know Someone Softly" 12-inch and CD singles | 3:18 |
| 6. | "Wishing Well" (Three Coins in a Fountain Mix) (Mixed by Martyn Ware) | D'Arby; Oliver | "Wishing Well" 12-inch single | 6:13 |
| 7. | "Dance Little Sister" (Parts One & Two) | D'Arby | "Dance Little Sister" 12-inch single | 8:40 |
| 8. | "Sign Your Name" (Lee 'Scratch' Perry Remix) | D'Arby | "Sign Your Name" 12-inch single (Lee 'Scratch' Perry Remixes) | 5:18 |
| 9. | "To Know Someone Deeply Is to Know Someone Softly" (Samba Mix) | D'Arby | "To Know Someone Deeply Is to Know Someone Softly" 12-inch and CD singles (Remixes) | 5:15 |
| 10. | "Do You Love Me Like You Say?" (Masters at Work Mix) | D'Arby | "Do You Love Me Like You Say?" U.S. 12-inch and CD singles | 7:47 |
| 11. | "Perfumed Pavillion" | D'Arby | B-side of "Do You Love Me Like You Say?" | 4:21 |
| 12. | "Survivor" | D'Arby | B-side of "Delicate" | 3:19 |
| Total length: | | | | 61:56 |

== Charts ==
| Chart (2002) | Peak position |
|---|---|
| Finnish Albums (Suomen virallinen lista) | 40 |

== Sales and certifications ==
Certifications for Greatest Hits
| Region | Certification | Certified units/sales |
|---|---|---|
| United Kingdom (BPI) | Silver | 60,000^{‡} |
^{^} Shipments figures based on certification alone.

== Release history ==
Release dates and formats for Greatest Hits
| Region | Date | Title | Label(s) | Format(s) | ID No. |
|---|---|---|---|---|---|
| Europe | 14 October 2002 | Terence Trent D'Arby's Greatest Hits | Columbia | Cassette | 509374 4 |
| Europe | 14 October 2002 | Terence Trent D'Arby's Greatest Hits | Columbia | CD | 509374 2 |
| Europe | 14 October 2002 | Terence Trent D'Arby's Greatest Hits | Columbia | 2CD | 509374 9 |
| Japan | 18 December 2002 | Terence Trent D'Arby's Greatest Hits | Sony Records Int'l | CD | SICP-309 |
| Worldwide | 2021 | Sananda Maitreya's Greatest Hits! | Sony Music Entertainment (UK) Ltd. | Digital download; Streaming | |
