= This Side of Love =

Single by Terence Trent D'Arby

from the album Neither Fish Nor Flesh
- B-side: "Sad Song for Sister Sarah Serenade"
- Released: November 1989
- Length: 4:57
- Label: Columbia
- Songwriter: Terence Trent D'Arby
- Producer: Terence Trent D'Arby

Terence Trent D'Arby singles chronology
"Rain" (1988)	"This Side of Love" (1989)	"To Know Someone Deeply Is to Know Someone Softly" (1990)

"This Side of Love" is a song by American singer and songwriter Terence Trent D'Arby taken from his second album, Neither Fish Nor Flesh (1989). The song was composed and produced by D'Arby, and he played several of the instruments on the recording. Critics have likened it to the work of musicians such as Sly and the Family Stone and Prince, and have noted its unpolished and compelling sound.

As a single, it reached the top 10 on one chart in the Netherlands, the top 40 in Italy and New Zealand, and the top 100 in Canada and the UK. The song has also been included on multiple compilation albums of D'Arby's, among them Terence Trent D'Arby's Greatest Hits and Sign Your Name: The Best of Terence Trent D'Arby.

== Background and recording ==
In his late teens, D'Arby enlisted in the U.S. Army and considered becoming a professional boxer. While stationed in Germany, he joined a group named Touch and realized that he wanted to dedicate his life to music. He left the Army, moved to London, and while there recorded a music demo; this led to his getting to a record contract. In 1987, D'Arby released his debut album, Introducing the Hardline According to Terence Trent D'Arby, which sold millions of copies worldwide. While his first album was heavily influenced by soul music, between its release and the recording of his second album, Neither Fish Nor Flesh, D'Arby became influenced by innovative 1960s music, including the Beach Boys' Pet Sounds.

Like all of the tracks on Neither Fish Nor Flesh, D'Arby wrote and produced "This Side of Love" himself. He additionally played many of the instruments on the song, such as drums, guitar, keyboards, and piano. A string section also performed on the recording, as did musicians Cass Lewis (bass) and Christian Marsac (saxophone).

The sound of "This Side of Love" has been compared to the work of Prince, Grand Funk Railroad, and Sly and the Family Stone. The song is "garage band-ish R&B" that has "sparse floor-tom rhythm, psychedelic strings, slashes of ricochet guitars bouncing from ear to ear, all tied together in a loose bow with a tough riff and hoarse vocal". The sound of the track has also been described as "skeletal, fiery", and "raw".

== Release ==
"This Side of Love" was released in October 1989 on Neither Fish Nor Flesh by Columbia Records. D'Arby initially convinced record executives to hold back from releasing any singles from the album; however, by November of that year sales of the album were slow, and "This Side of Love" was put out as the lead single. Its B-side was "Sad Song for Sister Sarah Serenade". "This Side of Love" was a No. 10 hit on one Dutch chart, and reached No. 36 in both Italy and New Zealand. Later, the song appeared on compilation albums including Terence Trent D'Arby's Greatest Hits (2002), Collections (2006), Sign Your Name: The Best of Terence Trent D'Arby (2007), and Original Album Classics (2011).

== Reception ==
Critical appraisal of "This Side of Love" has generally been positive. For AllMusic's Tom Demalon, the song is a "highlight" of Neither Fish Nor Flesh. It was described by The Atlantic's Jay Ferguson as "adventurous" and "raw and exciting". New York magazine's Elizabeth Wurtzel viewed it as "fun and raucous", while The New Yorker's Ben Greenman called it "one of [D'Arby's] finest moments". Taylor Dayne reviewed it for Number One, saying, "It doesn't sound anything like his earlier tunes and that's good. it's definitely a grower. You can really get into it after a few plays, it's got quite a nice driving guitar riff that really gets you hooked." Robert Christgau cited the track as an example of D'Arby's "master[y] of the black spectrum" of music and Spin's Howard Hampton declared it as "ear-popping".

== Track listings ==
U.K. 7-inch single / U.S. cassette single

1. "This Side of Love" – 4:59
2. "Sad Song for Sister Sarah Serenade" – 5:56

U.K. 12-inch maxi-single / U.K. cassette maxi-single

1. "This Side of Love" (Extended version) – 8:00
2. "Sad Song for Sister Sarah Serenade" – 5:56
3. "Sign Your Name" (Live) – 5:10

U.K. CD maxi-single

1. "This Side of Love" – 4:59
2. "This Side of Love" (Extended version) – 8:00
3. "Sad Song for Sister Sarah Serenade" – 5:56

U.K. 12-inch maxi-single (Remix) / U.K. CD maxi-single (Picture disc)

1. "This Side of Love" (12" Remix) – 8:59
2. "Sad Song for Sister Sarah Serenade" – 5:56
3. "Seven More Days" (François Kevorkian Remix) – 7:41

== Charts ==
Chart (1989–1990)	Peak position
Canada Top Singles (RPM)	46
Finland (Suomen virallinen lista)	14
Netherlands (Dutch Top 40)	10
Netherlands (Single Top 100)	50
Italy (Hit Parade Italia)	36
New Zealand (RIANZ)	36
UK Singles (OCC)	83
