= Let Her Down Easy =

1993 single by Terence Trent D'Arby

Single by Terence Trent D'Arby

from the album Symphony or Damn
- Released: November 8, 1993
- Length: 4:06
- Label: Columbia
- Songwriter: Terence Trent D'Arby
- Producer: Terence Trent D'Arby

Terence Trent D'Arby singles chronology
"She Kissed Me" (1993)	"Let Her Down Easy" (1993)	"Holding On to You" (1995)

Music video
- "Let Her Down Easy" on YouTube

"Let Her Down Easy" is a song written and produced by American singer-songwriter Terence Trent D'Arby for his third studio album, Symphony or Damn (1993). It was released as the fourth single in November 1993 by Columbia Records and reached number 18 on the UK Singles Chart and number six in New Zealand.

== Critical reception ==
Alex Kadis from Smash Hits gave the song a full score of five out of five, naming it Best New Single. She wrote, "It's a wonderful, haunting, graceful ballad with beautifully phrased vocals to take your breath away. If you've ever been in love with someone older or younger than you this will break your heart." Charles Aaron from Spin complimented it as a "exquisitely gooey single", describing it as "Elvis Costello with a racial identity bug-a-boo."

== Music video ==
The accompanying music video for "Let Her Down Easy" was directed by German director Marcus Nispel and produced by Anouk Frankel for Portofolio. It was released on 8 November 1993 and is a black-and-white narrative clip filmed in Los Angeles.

== Track listings ==
- CD, 7-inch and cassette single
1. "Let Her Down Easy" (Single Version) – 4:13
2. "Turn the Page" – 5:58
- CD maxi single
1. "Let Her Down Easy" (Album Version) – 4:09
2. "Sign Your Name" – 4:38
3. "Delicate" featuring Des'ree – 4:19
4. "Let Her Down Easy" (Single Version) – 4:12
- 12-inch single
1. "Let Her Down Easy" (Single Version)
2. "Turn the Page" (Club Mix)
3. "Turn the Page" (Dub Mix)
4. "Do You Love Me Like You Say?" (Original Rude Boy Mix)

== Charts ==
Chart (1993–1994)	Peak position
Australia (ARIA)	97
Europe (Eurochart Hot 100)	60
New Zealand (Recorded Music NZ)	6
UK Singles (OCC)	18

== George Michael version ==
"Let Her Down Easy"

Single by George Michael

from the album Symphonica
- Released: March 14, 2014
- Length: 3:41
- Label: Aegean
- Songwriter: Terence Trent D'Arby
- Producers: George Michael; Phil Ramone

George Michael singles chronology
"White Light" (2012)	"Let Her Down Easy" (2014)	"Going to a Town" (2014)

Music video
- "Let Her Down Easy" on YouTube

English singer-songwriter George Michael performed "Let Her Down Easy" during his 2011–12 Symphonica Tour and included it on the Symphonica album (2014). The music video for the song was released on February 4, 2014. On March 14, 2014, "Let Her Down Easy" was digitally released as the first single from the album.

=== Track listing ===
- Digital single
1. "Let Her Down Easy" – 3:41

=== Charts ===
Chart (2014)	Peak position
Belgium (Ultratip Bubbling Under Flanders)	25
Belgium (Ultratip Bubbling Under Wallonia)	8
UK Singles (OCC)	53

=== Release history ===
Country	Date	Format	Label	Ref.
Various	February 3, 2014	Contemporary hit radio	Aegean	
Various	March 14, 2014	Digital download	Aegean	
