= Symphonica (George Michael album) =

Live album with studio tracks by George Michael
- Released: 17 March 2014
- Venue: Royal Albert Hall (London)
- Studio: AIR (London); Legacy (New York City)
- Length: 64:14
- Label: Aegean; Virgin EMI
- Producer: Phil Ramone; George Michael; David Austin (exec.)

George Michael chronology
Twenty Five (2006)	Symphonica (2014)	Listen Without Prejudice / MTV Unplugged (2017)

Singles from Symphonica
- 1. "Let Her Down Easy" Released: 17 March 2014; 2. "Going to a Town" Released: 7 April 2014; 3. "Feeling Good" Released: 11 August 2014

Professional ratings
Aggregate scores
Source	Rating
Metacritic	60/100
Review scores
Source	Rating
AllMusic	3/5 stars
The Daily Telegraph	4/5 stars
The Guardian	3/5 stars
PopMatters	(6/10)
Rolling Stone	3/5 stars

Symphonica is a live album by English singer-songwriter George Michael and his only live album released during his lifetime. Released on 17 March 2014 through Aegean and Virgin EMI Records, Symphonica was Michael's first album of new recordings since Patience (2004). Michael's vocals were recorded at the Royal Albert Hall during his Symphonica Tour (2011–12), while the string arrangements were recorded in a studio.

== Background ==
The album contains mostly live versions of songs from his 2011–12 Symphonica Tour, including six of his own compositions (the rest being covers). The album was the final work by both American producer Phil Ramone, who died in March 2013, and by Michael himself, who died on Christmas Day (25 December) 2016. The lead single, a cover of the Terence Trent D'Arby song "Let Her Down Easy", debuted at number 53 on the UK Singles Chart in spite of little promotion. The album debuted at number one on the UK Albums Chart and sold 49,989 in its first week. "Patience", a further song from the tour which does not appear on the final album track listing, was available as a free download for one week only from Amazon.com in the UK to coincide with the album release.

== Track listing ==
Symphonica – standard edition
No.	Title	Writer(s)	Length
1.	"Through"	George Michael	5:09
2.	"My Baby Just Cares for Me"	Walter Donaldson; Gus Kahn	1:56
3.	"A Different Corner"	Michael	4:14
4.	"Praying for Time"	Michael	4:58
5.	"Let Her Down Easy"	Terence Trent D'Arby	3:50
6.	"The First Time Ever I Saw Your Face"	Ewan MacColl	5:24
7.	"Feeling Good"	Anthony Newley; Leslie Bricusse	3:15
8.	"John and Elvis Are Dead"	Michael; David Austin	4:31
9.	"One More Try"	Michael	5:14
10.	"Cowboys and Angels"	Michael	7:24
11.	"Idol"	Elton John; Bernie Taupin	4:29
12.	"Brother Can You Spare a Dime"	Jay Gorney; Yip Harburg	4:51
13.	"Wild Is the Wind"	Dimitri Tiomkin; Ned Washington	4:15
14.	"You've Changed"	Bill Carey; Carl T. Fischer	4:44
15.	"I Remember You" (digital bonus track)	Victor Schertzinger; Johnny Mercer	4:38

Symphonica – deluxe edition
No.	Title	Writer(s)	Length
1.	"Through"	Michael	5:09
2.	"My Baby Just Cares for Me"	Donaldson; Kahn	1:56
3.	"A Different Corner"	Michael	4:14
4.	"Praying for Time"	Michael	4:58
5.	"Let Her Down Easy"	D'Arby	3:50
6.	"The First Time Ever I Saw Your Face"	MacColl	5:24
7.	"Feeling Good"	Newley; Bricusse	3:15
8.	"John and Elvis Are Dead"	Michael; Austin	4:31
9.	"Roxanne"	Sting	4:20
10.	"One More Try"	Michael	5:14
11.	"Going to a Town"	Rufus Wainwright	4:45
12.	"Cowboys and Angels"	Michael	7:24
13.	"Idol"	John; Taupin	4:29
14.	"Brother Can You Spare a Dime"	Gorney; Harburg	4:52
15.	"You Have Been Loved"	Michael; Austin	5:41
16.	"Wild Is the Wind"	Tiomkin; Washington	4:15
17.	"You've Changed"	Carey; Fischer	4:44
18.	"I Remember You" (digital bonus track)	Schertzinger; Mercer	4:38

== Personnel ==
Credits adapted from AllMusic.

- Laurence Anslow – assistant engineer
- David Austin – executive producer, mastering
- Tom Bailey – assistant engineer
- Chris Barrett – assistant engineer
- Mike Brown – guitar
- Ben Butler – guitar
- Chris Cameron – arranger, keyboards, musical direction
- Fiona Cruickshank – assistant engineer
- Danny Cummings – percussion
- Frank Filipetti – engineer
- David Finck – bass, double bass
- Olga Fitzroy – assistant engineer
- Niall Flynn – engineer, mastering, Pro Tools
- Geoff Foster – engineer
- Gordon Goodwin – arranger
- Laurence Greed – assistant engineer
- Gavin Greenaway – conductor
- Simon Halfon – design
- Andy Hamilton – EWI, keyboards, tenor saxophone
- E.Y. "Yip" Harburg – composer
- Jay Henry – background vocals
- Carlos Hercules – drums
- Henry Hey – arranger, musical direction, piano
- James Jackman – programming
- Lincoln Jean-Marie – background vocals
- Lucy Jules – background vocals
- Graham Kearns – guitar
- Shirley Lewis – background vocals
- Mark McLean – drums
- Rob Mathes – arranger, conductor
- George Michael – design, lead vocals, producer
- Adam Miller – assistant engineer, Pro Tools
- Rob Mounsey – arranger
- Lea Mullen – percussion
- Phil Palmer – guitar
- Lori Perry – background vocals
- Sharon Perry – background vocals
- John Prestage – assistant engineer
- Phil Ramone – producer
- Steve Sidwell – conductor
- Luke Smith – keyboards
- Ray Staff – mastering
- Symphonica Air Orchestra – primary artist
- Symphonica US Orchestra – primary artist
- Caroline True – photography
- Steve Walters – bass
- Torrie Zito – arranger

== Charts ==
=== Weekly charts ===
Chart (2014)	Peak position
Australian Albums (ARIA)	11
Austrian Albums (Ö3 Austria)	7
Belgian Albums (Ultratop Flanders)	3
Belgian Albums (Ultratop Wallonia)	4
Croatian International Albums (HDU)	1
Czech Albums (ČNS IFPI)	5
Danish Albums (Hitlisten)	2
Dutch Albums (Album Top 100)	2
French Albums (SNEP)	15
German Albums (Offizielle Top 100)	6
Hungarian Albums (MAHASZ)	5
Irish Albums (IRMA)	1
Italian Albums (FIMI)	2
New Zealand Albums (RMNZ)	14
Norwegian Albums (VG-lista)	33
Polish Albums (ZPAV)	1
Portuguese Albums (AFP)	8
Scottish Albums (OCC)	2
Spanish Albums (PROMUSICAE)	16
Swiss Albums (Schweizer Hitparade)	6
UK Albums (OCC)	1
UK Album Downloads (OCC)	1
US Billboard 200	60

=== Year-end charts ===
Chart (2014)	Position
Belgian Albums (Ultratop Flanders)	57
Belgian Albums (Ultratop Wallonia)	49
Danish Albums (Hitlisten)	28
Dutch Albums (MegaCharts)	81
Hungarian Albums (MAHASZ)	86
Italian Albums (FIMI)	97
Polish Albums (ZPAV)	7
UK Albums (OCC)	35

== Certifications ==
Region	Certification	Certified units/sales
Denmark (IFPI Danmark)	Gold	10,000^{‡}
Poland (ZPAV)	Platinum	20,000^{‡}
United Kingdom (BPI)	Gold	200,000
^{‡} Sales+streaming figures based on certification alone.
