= Prometheus & Pandora =

11th album by Sananda Maitreya

Studio album by Sananda Maitreya
- Released: October 13, 2017
- Genre: R&B, soul, funk, rock
- Length: 3:00:05
- Label: Treehouse Publishing; THP033
- Producer: Sananda Maitreya

Sananda Maitreya chronology
The Rise of the Zugebrian Time Lords (2015)	Prometheus & Pandora (2017)	Pandora's PlayHouse (2021)

Prometheus & Pandora is the eleventh studio album by Sananda Maitreya, formerly known as Terence Trent D'Arby, released on October 13, 2017. It was recorded at Maitreya's home studios, Treehouse Lab, in Lodi, Italy, and was made available in CD format and to download from his official website. It has 53 tracks in three volumes. Guest vocalist Luisa Corna performs as Pandora on several tracks. Maitreya gave an interview to The Guardian ahead of its release, but said "I didn’t make this album to be back in the fray... Maybe it’s not meant for mass consumption."

"It's Been A Long Time" was released ahead of the album as a single, on September 22, 2017.

"She's My Baby" was originally released as the B-side of "Delicate" in 1993.

== Track listing ==
All songs written by Sananda Maitreya except where indicated.

Volume 1 / Prometheus

1. "Questions & Ulcers" 0:47
2. "Nymphony" 0:59
3. "New World Farming" 3:41
4. "She's My Baby" 4:13
5. "Glad She's Gone" 2:57
6. "U Cried A River" 5:46
7. "It's Been A Long Time" - Vocal duet with Luisa Corna 4:52
8. "Limp Dick Blues" 4:35
9. "Mid Life Crisis Blues" 3:50
10. "Country Changes" 4:13
11. "Assisted Living" 4:49
12. "Passing The Torture" 0:58
13. "Hiawatha" 3:20
14. "She'll Tell Me" 3:29
15. "I Don't Know How To Love (Prometheus)" - Vocal duet with Luisa Corna (Andrew Lloyd Webber, Tim Rice) 5:14
16. "If Joni Calls" 1:20
17. "Suicide Song" 5:25

Volume 2 / Pegasus

1. "Food For Trout" 0:20
2. "Zebra" (Sananda Maitreya, Louis Metoyer) 3:33
3. "Rhinoceros" 5:15
4. "Everybody Is The Bomb" 3:49
5. "I Don't Know How To Love (Pegasus)" (Andrew Lloyd Webber, Tim Rice) 5:07
6. "You Won't See Me" (Lennon-McCartney) 3:58
7. "The Marmoset" 2:29
8. "Tacoma" 3:50
9. "Go For The Gold" 3:55
10. "Hiawatha (Pegasus)" 3:20
11. "She'll Tell Me (Pegasus)" 3:28
12. "Limp Dick Blues (Pegasus)" 4:35
13. "U Cried A River (Pegasus)" 5:41
14. "If U Lived Here (Pegasus)" 6:12
15. "You Won't See Me - Encore" (Lennon-McCartney) 3:48
16. "It's Been A Long Time (Pegasus)" 4:35
17. "Horses For Corsica" 4:03
18. "Le Capre Della Sardegna" 0:32

Volume 3 / Pandora

1. "Passing The Torture (Pandora)" 0:33
2. "The Birds Are Singing (Pandora)" 2:28
3. "Hail Mary" 4:22
4. "I Don't Know How To Love (Pandora)" - Vocal duet with Luisa Corna (Andrew Lloyd Webber, Tim Rice) 5:27
5. "It's Been A Long Time" - Vocal duet with Luisa Corna 4:56
6. "If U Lived Here" - Vocal duet with Luisa Corna 6:24
7. "Take Good Care Of My Heart" 3:48
8. "Windows" 2:48
9. "Mona Lisa's Laughing" 4:11
10. "Before You Knew What Love Was" 4:53
11. "Gold Strings" 1:30
12. "Sacred" 3:43
13. "Amoeba Strain" 0:52
14. "Willow" (Sananda Maitreya, Carmen Rizzo) 3:10
15. "Nymphony - Reprise" 1:00
16. "Amoeba" 4:09
17. "Questions & Ulcers - Encore" 0:47
18. "Pandora's Box" 0:38

== Reviews ==
The Guardian called the album "a 53-track smorgasbord of rock, funk, soul, jazz and psych" and noted that amongst the "grand allegorical vision" there was still room for a track about impotence ("Limp Dick Blues"). It said Maitreya's witticisms "have been much missed." Louder Sound praised his "sublime 'son of Stevie Wonder' voice" but said the "long and complex" album "could have been condensed into a single CD for clarity and focus, but that was never going to happen." Albumism said, "some of the album scintillates, while other parts are less satisfying", criticizing the alternate versions of already heard songs which "sometimes infuriates to the point of distraction."
