= The Rise of the Zugebrian Time Lords =

Studio album by Sananda Maitreya
- Released: October 9, 2015
- Genre: R&B, soul, funk, rock
- Length: 98:27 (V1-51:59, V2-46:28)
- Label: Treehouse Publishing; THP020
- Producer: Sananda Maitreya

Sananda Maitreya chronology
Return to Zooathalon (2013)	The Rise of the Zugebrian Time Lords (2015)	Prometheus & Pandora (2017)

Professional ratings
Review scores
Source	Rating
This Is Not Retro	3/5 stars

The Rise Of The Zugebrian Time Lords is a double studio album by Sananda Maitreya (formerly Terence Trent D'Arby). It is available as MP3 files and on CD format, from his on-line web store. According to the artist, the time lords are people able to go back in time and destroy your past, leaving you unable to leave your mark on the world. This is his 10th studio album; it was recorded at his studios in Milan, Italy.

== Track listing ==
The Rise of the Zugebrian Time Lords - Volume I

1. ”You're Going to Lose That Girl” - 2:26
2. ”Blanket On The Ground” - 3:28
3. ”The Marriage of Nigaro” - 3:28
4. ”Giraffe” - 4:38
5. ”Zugebrian Blues” - 2:44
6. ”Les Paul Man (Love Is Love) ” - 3:32
7. ”I'm Not Angry (I'm Just Mean) ” - 4:10
8. ”They Went Back In Time & Killed Robert Johnson” - 3:16
9. ”Never Trust A Man Like Me” - 2:59
10. ”Mr. Casanova” - 3:43
11. ”Apologize To Her” - 3:48
12. ”I Wanna Breathe” - 3:48
13. ”Snowglobia” - 3:15
14. ”Paradise Postponed” - 4:44

The Rise of the Zugebrian Time Lords - Volume II

1. ”Andiamo Tutti A Casa” - 0:48
2. ”The Birds Are Singing” - 3:10
3. ”If I Fell” - 4:16
4. ”Siamo Qui” - 3:13
5. ”Metamorpheus” - 4:00
6. ”Yes You! ” - 4:11
7. ”Allergic” - 3:16
8. ”It's Yours” - 4:01
9. ”Jamaica Blue” - 4:01
10. ”We Can All Go Home” - 3:31
11. ”I'll Be Back” - 4:07
12. ”Paradise Postponed Prelude” - 4:09
13. ”Body & Soul” - 3:24
