= Return to Zooathalon =

Return to Zooathlon

Studio album by Sananda Maitreya
- Released: March 1, 2013
- Genre: R&B, soul, funk, rock
- Label: Treehouse Publishing; THP013
- Producer: Sananda Maitreya

Sananda Maitreya chronology
The Sphinx (2011)	Return to Zooathlon (2013)	The Rise Of The Zugebrian Time Lords (2015)

Return To Zooathlon is the ninth studio album by Sananda Maitreya (formerly Terence Trent D'Arby). It was released on March 1, 2013 via Treehouse Publishing label. It is available as MP3 files and on CD format, from his on-line web store.

== Track listing ==
1. ”Brimstone Follies” - 0:59
2. ”DFM (Don't Follow Me)” - 3:21
3. ”Save Me” - 3:23
4. ”Dancing With Mr. Nostalgia” - 3:19
5. ”Stagger Lee - Part 1” - 1:44
6. ”Stagger Lee - Part 2” - 2:30
7. ”Ornella Or Nothing” - 3:38
8. ”Where Do Teardrops Fall?” - 4:29
9. ”Albuquerque” - 3:21
10. ”Camel” - 3:14
11. ”Mr. Gruberschnickel” - 3:37
12. ”Just Go Easy” - 4:23
13. ”Tequila Mockingbird” - 3:25
14. ”She's Not Right” - 2:44
15. ”Return To Zooathalon” - 4:07
16. ”Walk Away” - Ghost Song” - 3:02
17. ”Hurricane Me & You” - 4:58
18. ”If I Go Away” - 3:49
19. ”Free To Be” - 4:44
20. ”Kangaroo” - 3:55
21. ”D.H.S.” - 0:36
22. ”The Last Train To Houston” - 5:24
