= Symphony or Damn =

Studio album by Terence Trent D'Arby
- Released: May 3, 1993
- Genres: Rock; soul; pop; dance; college rock
- Label: Columbia
- Producer: Terence Trent D'Arby

Terence Trent D'Arby chronology
Neither Fish nor Flesh (1989)	Symphony or Damn (1993)	Vibrator (1995)

Singles from Symphony or Damn
- 1. "Do You Love Me Like You Say?" Released: April 5, 1993; 2. "She Kissed Me" Released: May 10, 1993; 3. "Delicate" Released: June 7, 1993; 4. "Let Her Down Easy" Released: November 8, 1993

Professional ratings
Review scores
Source	Rating
AllMusic	4.5/5 stars
Calgary Herald	B
Robert Christgau	(choice cut)
Entertainment Weekly	A
The Hour	(favorable)
Music Week	4/5 stars
NME	4/10

Terence Trent D'Arby's Symphony or Damn* (*Exploring the Tension Inside the Sweetness) is the third studio album by Terence Trent D'Arby, released in 1993 through Columbia Records. This album marked something of a comeback after the disappointing performance of his previous album Neither Fish nor Flesh, and was generally well received by many critics, with Q magazine rating it five stars upon its release. The album's title comes from a line in the song "Do You Love Me Like You Say?".

== Composition ==
The album is heavier in sound than D'Arby's debut album, which was essentially a mix of pop, soul and gospel. However Symphony or Damn contains several guitar oriented songs, such as "Do You Love Me Like You Say?", "Castillian Blue", "Are You Happy?" and the out-and-out rocker "She Kissed Me". The latter is an up-tempo hard rock song, that features the line "she likes rap and metal really loud", alluding to the subject's love of hip hop and heavy metal music. However, "Castillian Blue" and "Are You Happy?" have a blues guitar sound, with the former sounding dark and brooding and the latter featuring a far more upbeat pop/soul/blues sound. The drum sound throughout most of the album is also of a heavy nature.

"Penelope Please" namechecks the Pretenders frontwoman Chrissie Hynde in the chorus: "You will still be home in time, to watch The Pops, featuring Chrissie Hynde".

== Commercial success and single releases ==
The album peaked at number 4 on the UK Albums Chart and was boosted by four top 20 UK singles, "Do You Love Me Like You Say?", "Delicate", featuring Des'ree (both tracks peaked at number 14 on the UK Singles Chart), "She Kissed Me" (UK number 16) and "Let Her Down Easy" (UK number 18).

Two more tracks were released from the album but they were not as successful as the aforementioned tracks. "Turn the Page" failed to chart, while "Neon Messiah" was released as an EP in Japan only. This included a number of B-sides and is a widely sought-after collector's item.

=== North America ===
In Canada, the album debuted at number 76 on the RPM's Top 100 albums chart in the week dated May 29, 1993. The following week it peaked at number 71. It spent a total of nine weeks in the top 100.

== Track listing ==
1. "Welcome to My Monasteryo" – 0:31
2. "She Kissed Me" – 3:39
3. "Do You Love Me Like You Say?" – 5:30
4. "Baby, Let Me Share My Love" – 3:56
5. "Delicate" (featuring Des'ree) – 4:16
6. "Neon Messiah" – 3:55
7. "Penelope Please" – 3:07
8. "Wet Your Lips" – 4:15
9. "Turn the Page" – 6:07
10. "Castilian Blue" – 5:15
11. "Tension Inside The Sweetness/Frankie & Johnny" – 3:29
12. "Are You Happy?" – 3:54
13. "Succumb to Me" – 5:14
14. "I Still Love You" – 2:15
15. "Seasons" – 5:37
16. "Let Her Down Easy" – 4:06

== Personnel ==
- Terence Trent D'Arby – all voices (1), sounds (1), vocals (2–16), backing vocals (2, 3, 5–8, 10, 12–15), rhythm guitar (2, 6), percussion (2, 3, 6–9, 12–15), keyboards (3, 5–9, 12–16), drums (3, 5–8, 10, 12), drum loops (3), all noises (4), all instruments (4), guitars (5, 7, 8, 10, 13–16), clavinet (6, 12), acoustic guitar (6, 10, 15), drum programming (6, 9, 13), horn arrangements (6, 9, 11), bass (7, 8, 10, 12, 13), string arrangements (11, 15), snare drum (16), all other instruments (16)
- Matthew Vaughan – programming
- Greg Phillinganes – keyboards (11)
- Randy Kerber – electric piano (12)
- Tommy Girvin – lead guitar (2), guitars (8)
- Chester Kamen – lead guitar (2), 12-string guitar (12)
- Tim Pierce – guitars (3, 6, 11, 12)
- Aaron McClain – guitars (5)
- Leland Sklar – bass (2)
- Kevin Wyatt – bass (3, 5)
- Tim Archibald – bass (9)
- Neil Stubenhaus – bass (11, 12)
- Will McGregor – bass (14)
- Curt Bisquera – drums (2)
- Harvey Mason – drums (11)
- Novi Novog – fiddle harmonics (14)
- The Hummingbird String Company – strings (15)
- Des'ree – vocals (5)

Tower of Power Horns (Tracks 6 & 11)

- Stephen "Doc" Kupka – baritone saxophone
- Emilio Castillo – tenor saxophone
- Brandon Fields – lead tenor saxophone
- Greg Adams – trumpet
- Lee Thornburg – trumpet

The Atlantic Horns (Track 9)

- Bob Bowlby – alto saxophone
- Scott Gilman – tenor saxophone
- Dino Govoni – tenor saxophone
- Donny McCaslin – tenor saxophone
- John Wheller – trombone
- John Allmark – trumpet, flugelhorn, piccolo trumpet, section leader
- Joe Giorgianni – trumpet
- Andy Gravish – trumpet
- Peter Cirelli – baritone horn

String section (Track 11)

- Suzie Katayama – cello
- Novi Novog – viola
- Charlie Bisharat – violin
- Joel Derouin – violin
- Robin Lorentz – violin

== Production ==
- Terence Trent D'Arby – producer, arrangements, liner notes
- Craig Porteils – recording (1–10, 11–14, 16), mixing (11)
- Tchad Blake – recording (9, 15), mixing (15)
- Mark "Spike" Stent – mixing (1–8, 10, 12, 13)
- Ron Jacobs – mixing (14)
- Shelly Yakus – mixing (14)
- Stephen Marcussen – mastering at Precision Mastering (Hollywood, California)
- Greg Edward – album sequencing technician
- Julie Blair Carter – art direction, design
- Hans Neleman – photography
- Michael Lippman – management

== Charts ==
=== Weekly charts ===
Chart (1993)	Peak position
Australian Albums (ARIA)	8
Austrian Albums (Ö3 Austria)	38
Canadian Albums (RPM)	71
Dutch Albums (Album Top 100)	51
European Albums (Music & Media)	18
Finnish Albums (Suomen virallinen lista)	15
German Albums (Offizielle Top 100)	56
Italian Albums (Musica e dischi)	13
New Zealand Albums (RMNZ)	14
Swedish Albums (Sverigetopplistan)	28
Swiss Albums (Schweizer Hitparade)	23
UK Albums (Official Charts)	4
US Billboard 200	119

=== Year-end charts ===
Chart (1993)	Position
Italian Albums (Musica e dischi)	88
