= The Sphinx (album) =

Studio album by Sananda Maitreya
- Released: March 15, 2011
- Genre: R&B, soul, funk, rock
- Length: 1:13:11
- Label: Treehouse Publishing; THP011
- Producer: Sananda Maitreya

Sananda Maitreya chronology
Nigor Mortis (2009)	The Sphinx (2011)	Return to Zooathalon (2013)

The Sphinx is an album by Sananda Maitreya (formerly Terence Trent D'Arby). It is available as MP3 files and on CD format, from his on-line web store. The record is the artist's ninth studio album and the 16th project overall, including live albums releases.

== Track listing ==
1. ”The Sphinx” - 1:17
2. ”Christine” - 4:08
3. ”The Ballad of LeBron & Kobe” - 3:17
4. ”I Saw Her” - 3:31
5. ”If All I Do Is Cry” - 5:13
6. ”The Blame” - 3:07
7. ”The Captain's Table” - 3:29
8. ”All The Way To Memphis” - 2:59
9. ”Euphoria” - 4:15
10. ”Azerbaijan” - 3:48
11. ”Christine - Part 2” - 4:11
12. ”King Of The Silver Medal” - 2:11
13. ”This Far” - 3:25
14. ”Sananda's Variation on a theme by Mozart” - 1:44
15. ”Marry Me” - 3:52
16. ”Big Baby” - 2:24
17. ”What Baby Wants” - 3:37
18. ”Eat My Thumb” - 2:44
19. ”Time Takes Time” - Takes 2 - 2:39
20. ”I Never Know” - 2:06
21. ”The Laughing Song” - 3:58
22. ”The Quarterback Song” - 2:14
23. ”The Sphinx - Reprise” - 0:25
24. ”She's Sad” - 2:44
