= Pandora's PlayHouse =

Studio album by Sananda Maitreya
- Released: March 15, 2021
- Genres: R&B, soul, funk, rock
- Length: 1:51:00
- Labels: Treehouse Publishing; THP066
- Producer: Sananda Maitreya

Sananda Maitreya chronology
Prometheus & Pandora (2017)	Pandora's PlayHouse (2021)	The Pegasus Project: Pegasus & The Swan (2024)

Pandora’s PlayHouse is the twelfth studio album by Sananda Maitreya (formerly Terence Trent D'Arby), released on March 15, 2021. A double album with 28 tracks, it was released on CD and as a digital download from his website. A single, "The Madhouse", was released as a download and streaming, ahead of the album. It also contains a tribute to his idol Prince. Speaking to The Times, he said, "we definitely saw a lot of ourselves in each other." Maitreya wrote all the songs and played every instrument on every track, with the exception of three collaborations, the cover "Time Is on My Side" with Irene Grandi, "Reflecting Light" with The Avalanches and Vashti Bunyan, and "Pandora's Plight" with Antonio Faraò.

== Track listing ==
All songs written by Sananda Maitreya except where indicated.

Volume One

1. "Pandora's Plight" - 2:09
2. "Time Is on My Side" (Norman Meade, Jimmy Norman) - 2:55
3. "Don't Break My Balls" - 3:03
4. "Mama's Boy Blues" - 4:22
5. "The Ballad Of Rod Steiger" - 6:26
6. "Don't Leave Me Here!" - 4:33
7. "Yuki Suzuki" - 3:26
8. "Her Kiss" - 5:48
9. "The MadHouse" - 4:04
10. "Life's A Bitch" - 5:11
11. "The Kings Of Avalon" - 3:15
12. "Pie" - 6:06
13. "Mr. Skeleton" - 3:25
14. "GlassHouse" - 2:09

Volume Two

1. "Pandora's PlayHouse" - 4:27
2. "Reflecting Light" - 4:20
3. "The Queens Of Babylon" - 3:33
4. "Her Kiss – Acoustic " - 5:44
5. "A Cool Breeze" - 5:10
6. "One Horse Town" - 3:33
7. "If This Van Is Rocking" - 4:20
8. "Prometheus Rising" - 2:57
9. "In America" - 3:52
10. "The Ballad Of Smokey Robinson" - 4:06
11. "Casa di Vetro" - 2:33
12. "Excuse Me, But..." - 3:03
13. "Don't Break My Balls" - 2:55
14. "Prince!" - 3:18

== Reception ==
The Scotsman noted the length of the album but also Maitreya's "ear for a pop hook on a handful of tracks which jump out from an otherwise overstuffed pack," and said his "raspy soul pipes remain in good shape." Buzz called it "self-indulgent in the extreme" saying the better songs could have worked on a single album. MNPR Magazine called the understated performance of "Her Kiss (acoustic)" an album highlight, and praised the funk rock of "MadHouse" but criticized the sometimes sloppy performances and the weakening of the album's concept as it went on - "It seems Maitreya’s albums have often become victims of their own excessiveness."
