= Nigor Mortis =

Studio album by Sananda Maitreya
- Released: May 20, 2009
- Genre: R&B, soul, funk, rock
- Length: 75:19
- Label: Treehouse Publishing; THP010
- Producer: Sananda Maitreya

Sananda Maitreya chronology
Angels & Vampires - Volume II (2006)	Nigor Mortis (2009)	The Sphinx (2011)

Nigor Mortis is the seventh studio album by Sananda Maitreya (formerly Terence Trent D'Arby).

== Overview ==
The project was recorded in Milan, Italy, where the artist has lived since 2002, over the course of five studio sessions.

All songs are written, arranged, produced and performed by Sananda Maitreya. Two songs ("With A Girl Like You" and "Angel (Not A Saint)") have the participation of Lucio Fabbri on fiddle and banjo. Maitreya plays the four basic instruments of rock music: drums, bass, guitar and keyboards.

The name "Nigor Mortis" represents the state between rigor mortis and "vigor mortis", from the stiffness of a corpse to the vitality of life.

An instrumental version of the album was also recorded.

== Track listing ==
1. "O Lovely Gwenita" - 3:18
2. "This Town" - 3:37
3. "With a Girl Like You" - 3:44
4. "I Never Knew How Much" - 3:39
5. "At the Crossroads" - 5:35
6. "A Wife Knows" - 3:27
7. "These Stones" - 2:51
8. "If I Just Stay With You" - 3:39
9. "Has It Been Too Quiet?" - 3:27
10. "Free Me" - 3:21
11. "I Don't Give a Fuck About You" - 2:57
12. "Mrs. Gupta" - 4:19
13. "Ooh Carolina" - 3:02
14. "Family Reunion" - 1:55
15. "Where Did the Money Go?" - 1:50
16. "Because You've Changed" - 3:18
17. "Superstar" - 3:03
18. "December in the Rain" - 3:05
19. "Angel (Not a Saint)" - 3:00
20. "What Would You Like?" - 3:44
21. "Cowboys & Injuries" - 2:03
22. "Priscilla" - 2:27
23. "The Lost Highway" - 3:47
