= If You Let Me Stay =

1987 single by Terence Trent D'Arby

Single by Terence Trent D'Arby

from the album Introducing the Hardline According to Terence Trent D'Arby
- Released: February 16, 1987
- Length: 3:14
- Label: Columbia
- Songwriters: Terence Trent D'Arby, Rob Miller
- Producer: Howard Gray

Terence Trent D'Arby singles chronology
"If You Let Me Stay" (1987)	"Wishing Well" (1987)

"If You Let Me Stay" is a song by American singer Terence Trent D'Arby, released as his debut single. It was released as the first single from his debut album, Introducing the Hardline According to Terence Trent D'Arby, in February 1987.

== Reception ==
"If You Let Me Stay" reached number 68 on the Billboard Hot 100 and peaked at number seven on the UK Singles Chart. It was not until the release of the second single, "Wishing Well", that D'Arby managed to crossover his success in the UK to the US.

== Track listings ==
- US and UK 7-inch single
1. "If You Let Me Stay" (remix) – 3:13
2. "Loving You is Another Word for Lonely" – 2:22
- US and UK 12-inch maxi-single
1. "If You Let Me Stay" (extended remix) – 6:03
2. "If You Let Me Stay" (Hardline mix) – 3:17
3. "Loving You is Another Word for Lonely" – 2:22
- UK double 12-inch maxi-single
1. "If You Let Me Stay" (extended remix)
2. "If You Let Me Stay" (Hardline mix)
3. "Loving You is Another Word for Lonely"
4. "If You Let Me Stay" (Capital Radio Session)
5. "Sunday Jam"
6. "Wonderful World"

== Charts ==
=== Weekly charts ===
Weekly chart performance for "If You Let Me Stay"
Chart (1987–1988)	Peak position
Australia (ARIA)	41
Belgium (Ultratop 50 Flanders)	15
Europe (European Hot 100 Singles)	38
France (SNEP)	46
Ireland (IRMA)	12
Italy Airplay (Music & Media)	14
Luxembourg (Radio Luxembourg)	6
Netherlands (Dutch Top 40)	12
Netherlands (Single Top 100)	11
New Zealand (Recorded Music NZ)	4
Sweden (Sverigetopplistan)	17
UK Singles (Official Charts)	7
US Billboard Hot 100	68
US Dance Club Songs (Billboard) Remix	47
US Dance Singles Sales (Billboard)	26
US Hot R&B/Hip-Hop Songs (Billboard)	19
West Germany (GfK)	27

=== Year-end charts ===
Year-end chart performance for "If You Let Me Stay"
Chart (1987)	Position
Europe (European Hot 100 Singles)	98
New Zealand (RIANZ)	19
UK Singles (OCC)	67

== Release history ==
Release dates and formats for "If You Let Me Stay"
Region	Date	Format(s)	Label(s)	Ref.
United Kingdom	February 16, 1987	7-inch vinyl; 12-inch vinyl	CBS	
United States	October 1987	7-inch vinyl; 12-inch vinyl; cassette	Columbia	
Japan	October 21, 1987	12-inch vinyl	Epic	
