= Vibrator (album) =

Studio album by Terence Trent D'Arby
- Released: April 18, 1995
- Recorded: 1994
- Genres: Rock; soul; funk
- Length: 65:55
- Label: Columbia
- Producer: Terence Trent D'Arby

Terence Trent D'Arby chronology
| Symphony or Damn (1993) | Vibrator (1995) | Wildcard (2001) |

Terence Trent D'Arby's Vibrator* (*Batteries Included) is the fourth album by Terence Trent D'Arby, released in 1995 on Columbia Records. It was self-written, produced, and arranged, and features the single "Holding On to You", which peaked at number 20 on the UK Singles Chart.

== Critical reception ==
Professional ratings
Review scores
| Source | Rating |
|---|---|
| AllMusic | 2.5/5 stars |
| Entertainment Weekly | B |
| NME | 2/10 |
| Select | 1/5 medals |
| Spin | 4/10 |

Select gave the album a rating of one out of five, finding the album derivative of Prince, Jimi Hendrix, Rod Stewart and Marvin Gaye." Music journalist James Richliano stated that the set is made up of musical gems, in which D'Arby reveals himself to be a lover and a poet, whose "rich, soulful voice immediately seizes the ear." In 2020, marking the album's 25th anniversary, Andy Healy said it "may not have been packed with quantifiable hits, but it is undeniably welcoming and enjoyable."

== Track listing ==
1. "Vibrator" – 5:43
2. "Supermodel Sandwich" – 3:32
3. "Holding On To You" – 5:44
4. "Read My Lips (I Dig Your Scene)" – 4:49
5. "Undeniably" – 4:59
6. "We Don't Have That Much Time Together" – 4:40
7. "C.Y.F.M.L.A.Y?" – 4:04
8. "If You Go Before Me" – 3:44
9. "Surrender" – 4:56
10. "TTD's Recurring Dream" – 5:31
11. "Supermodel Sandwich W/Cheese" – 3:59
12. "Resurrection" – 6:25
13. "It's Been Said" – 4:10

== Charts ==
=== Weekly charts ===
| Chart (1995) | Peak position |
|---|---|
| Dutch Albums (Album Top 100) | 27 |
| European Albums (Music & Media) | 28 |
| German Albums (Offizielle Top 100) | 58 |
| Italian Albums (Musica e dischi) | 17 |
| New Zealand Albums (RMNZ) | 32 |
| Swiss Albums (Schweizer Hitparade) | 8 |
| UK Albums (Official Charts) | 11 |
| US Billboard 200 | 178 |

=== Year-end charts ===
| Chart (1995) | Position |
|---|---|
| Italian Albums (Musica e dischi) | 100 |
