= Angels & Vampires – Volume I =

Studio album by Sananda Maitreya
- Released: 2005
- Genre: Rock
- Length: 68:00
- Label: Treehouse Publishing

Sananda Maitreya chronology
Wildcard (2001)	Angels & Vampires – Volume I (2005)	Angels & Vampires – Volume II (2006)

Angels & Vampires – Volume I is Sananda Maitreya's sixth album, released in 2005 on his own official website. It was his first album to be released under his new legal name; previous albums were credited under the stage name of Terence Trent D'Arby.

The album was released only as an internet download and introduced a more organic, stripped-down sound, quite different from Maitreya's earlier albums that had heavily taken advantage of electronic equipment.

This album was released together with volume II as a limited double CD release in 2007, the double set is only available on his official website and during concerts.

== Track listing ==
1. "Four Shadow" – 0:51
2. "Angie" – 2:09
3. "Boolay Boolay" – 2:33
4. "More Than You Do" – 2:19
5. "Reach Out" – 4:03
6. "I'm Your Daddy" – 3:31
7. "Dolphin" – 5:42
8. "Time Takes Time" – 2:23
9. "Share Your Pain" – 3:06
10. "We are the Living" – 5:02
11. "It Ain't Been Easy" – 3:16
12. "Psychotherapy" – 3:56
13. "Bella Faccina" – 3:48
14. "The Kind of Girl" – 4:26
15. "If All I've Got" – 2:09
16. "Losing Becomes Too Easy" – 5:19
17. "Daddy, Can I Have a War?" – 2:57
18. "Gloria (Maitreya's Song)" – 4:54
19. "She Knows I'm Leaving" – 2:53
20. "Right Brain Says" – 3:04
