= Neither Fish nor Flesh =

Studio album by Terence Trent D'Arby
- Released: October 23, 1989
- Genres: Psychedelic pop, rock, R&B, funk
- Length: 51:24
- Label: Columbia
- Producer: Terence Trent D'Arby

Terence Trent D'Arby chronology
Introducing the Hardline According to Terence Trent D'Arby (1987)	Neither Fish nor Flesh (1989)	Symphony or Damn (1993)

Professional ratings
Review scores
Source	Rating
AllMusic	3.5/5 stars
New Musical Express	8/10
Record Mirror	5/5 stars
Rolling Stone	4/5 stars
The Vancouver Sun	2/5 stars
The Village Voice	A−

Neither Fish nor Flesh (A Soundtrack of Love, Faith, Hope & Destruction) is the second album by American singer Terence Trent D'Arby, released in 1989 on Columbia Records. A follow-up to his debut Introducing the Hardline, the album received mixed reviews upon release and achieved less commercial success than its predecessor, spending only four weeks on the UK Albums Chart. In later years, however, it has undergone critical reappraisal, with some writers describing it as an ambitious and misunderstood work that was ahead of its time.

== Reception ==
In a review of Neither Fish nor Flesh for The Village Voice, Robert Christgau said despite D'Arby's pretensions and awful lyrics on some songs, the psychedelic pop record's music "proves D'Arby a master of the black spectrum from the trad R&B of 'I'll Be Alright' to the reconstructed Prince-funk of 'This Side of Love'". Andrew Martin, reviewer of British music newspaper Music Week, chose it as "Album of the Week" and called it "as a complete work, a masterpiece". He concludes: "D'Arby's wit, verve and self-professed genius remains intact." Rolling Stone critic Mark Coleman said D'Arby's effort "fails to establish him as a visionary pop godhead. It does, however, demonstrate convincingly that he's far more than a mere legend in his own mind." Pan-European magazine Music & Media considered that "conflicting rumours preceding this second LP have actually worked in its favour." Reviewer was pleasantly surprised and found the majority of this record accessible and highly entertaining. AllMusic's Tom Demalon retrospectively called it "a sprawling, overly ambitious work that incorporates Middle Eastern flavorings and even more of a gospel influence into his gritty mix of rock, R&B, and funk", although he felt D'Arby's "pretensions run a bit wild".

On the album commentary on his website, D'Arby (now known as Sananda Maitreya) claimed that the album's lack of commercial impact was due to his record company's "wholesale rejection of it" as well as being hindered by German record producer Frank Farian who decided to release an album of D'Arby's performances with funk band The Touch (from 1984) in Germany just weeks before Neither Fish Nor Flesh was due for release. Maitreya states that Neither Fish Nor Flesh was "the project that literally killed 'TTD', and from whose molten ashes, began the life of Sananda".

== Commercial performance ==
=== North America ===
In Canada the album debuted at number 58 on the RPM in the week dated December 9, 1989. In its ninth week on the chart the album peaked at number 39 in January 1990. The album spent a total of fifteen weeks in the top 100.

== Track listing ==
All songs written and arranged by Terence Trent D'Arby.

1. "Declaration: Neither Fish Nor Flesh" – 1:44
2. "I Have Faith in These Desolate Times" – 4:14
3. "It Feels So Good to Love Someone Like You" – 3:38
4. "To Know Someone Deeply Is to Know Someone Softly" – 4:27
5. "I'll Be Alright" – 5:57
6. "Billy Don't Fall" – 4:21
7. "This Side of Love" – 4:59
8. "Attracted to You" – 4:01
9. "Roly Poly" – 3:54
10. "You Will Pay Tomorrow" – 4:54
11. "I Don't Want to Bring Your Gods Down" – 6:19
12. "...And I Need to Be with Someone Tonight" – 3:04

== Personnel ==
- Terence Trent D'Arby (aka the Incredible E.G. O'Reilly, aka Ecneret Tnert Ybra'D) – vocals, all arrangements, guitars (1, 2, 6, 7, 8), percussion (2–6, 8, 9, 10, 12), various sound effects (2, 3, 7, 9), keyboards (3, 4, 7, 8, 9), organ (3, 9), sitar (3), cymbals (3), timpani (3), scratching (3), acoustic piano (4, 7, 9), drums (4, 6–9, 11), vibraphone (4), handclaps (5), clavinet (6, 8, 10), tambourine (8, 10, 11), Fender Rhodes (9, 11), marimba (9), kazoo (10)
- Michael Timothy – scoring, Hammond B3 organ (4, 8, 11), bass (4), Fender Rhodes (5), acoustic piano (8, 9, 11), recorder (9)

with:

- Bob Andrews – Hammond organ (5)
- Pete Wingfield – acoustic piano (5)
- Bob Brimson – guitars (1)
- Anthony Drennan – guitars (1)
- Conor Brady – guitars (4, 6, 11)
- Christian Marsac – guitars (5), saxophone (7)
- Pete Glenister – guitars (7–10)
- Percy Robinson – pedal steel guitar (3)
- Cass Lewis – bass (5, 9, 10)
- Eoghan O'Neill – bass (6, 7, 11)
- Tony Malloy – bass (8)
- Geoff Dunn – drums (5, 10)
- Jeff Scantlebury – sparkle sticks (10)
- Helen Davies – koto water harp (2)
- Simon Clarke – alto saxophone (5)
- Tim Sanders – tenor saxophone (5, 10)
- Richie Buckley – tenor saxophone (8)
- Richard Addison – clarinet (9)
- David White – clarinet (9)
- Michael Jeans – oboe (9)
- John Curran – saxophone (11)
- Carl Geraghty – saxophone (11)
- Jack Bayle – trombone (11)
- Roddy Lorimer – trumpet (5, 10)
- Paul Spong – trumpet (5, 10)
- Dick Pearce – trumpet (9)
- Stephen McDonnell – trumpet (11)
- David Maldwyn James – cello (3)
- John Heley – cello (7)
- Martin Loveday – cello (9, 10)
- Neil Martin – viola (3, 11)
- Padraig O'Connor – viola (3, 11)
- David Emanuel – viola (7, 9)
- Chris Wellington – viola (7)
- Roger Chase – viola (10)
- Alan Smale – violin (3, 11)
- Katherine Smale – violin (3, 11)
- Wilfred Gibson – violin (7, 9)
- Gavyn Wright – violin (7, 9, 10)
- Ben Cruft – violin (10)

Alan Smale and Katherine Smale appear as The Degani Ensemble, while Simon Clarke, Roddy Lorimer, Paul Spong and Tim Sanders appear as the Kick Horns.

=== Production ===
- Terence Trent D'Arby – producer, mixing
- Tim Martin – recording, mixing
- Richard O'Donovan – recording assistant, mix assistant
- John Donnelly – mechanical manifestations
- Ian Cooper – mastering at The Town House (London, UK)
- Michael Nash Associates – design
- Alistair Thain – photography

== Charts ==
Chart (1989–1990)	Peak position
Australian Albums (ARIA)	40
Austrian Albums (Ö3 Austria)	28
Canadian Albums (RPM)	39
Dutch Albums (Album Top 100)	32
Finnish Albums (Suomen virallinen lista)	13
German Albums (Offizielle Top 100)	26
Italian Albums (Musica e dischi)	9
New Zealand Albums (RMNZ)	42
Norwegian Albums (VG-lista)	16
Swedish Albums (Sverigetopplistan)	47
Swiss Albums (Schweizer Hitparade)	20
UK Albums (Official Charts)	12
US Billboard 200	61
US Top R&B/Hip-Hop Albums (Billboard)	75

== Sales and certifications ==
Certifications for Neither Fish nor Flesh
Region	Certification	Certified units/sales
Canada (Music Canada)	Gold	50,000^{^}
Spain (Promusicae)	Platinum	100,000^{^}
United Kingdom (BPI)	Gold	100,000^{^}
^{^} Shipments figures based on certification alone.
