= Wishing Well (Terence Trent D'Arby song) =

1987 song by Terence Trent D'Arby

Single by Terence Trent D'Arby

from the album Introducing the Hardline According to Terence Trent D'Arby
- B-side: "Elevators & Hearts"
- Released: June 8, 1987
- Genre: Soul; pop; funk
- Length: 3:33
- Label: Columbia
- Songwriters: Terence Trent D'Arby; Sean Oliver
- Producers: Terence Trent D'Arby; Martyn Ware

Terence Trent D'Arby singles chronology
"If You Let Me Stay" (1987)	"Wishing Well" (1987)	"Dance Little Sister" (1987)

Music video
- "Wishing Well" on YouTube

"Wishing Well" is a song by American singer-songwriter Terence Trent D'Arby. Written by D'Arby and Sean Oliver, D'Arby said "Wishing Well" was written "when I was in a half-asleep, half-awake state of mind", and that he "liked the feel of the words". Martyn Ware of Heaven 17 produced the song along with D'Arby. Released through Columbia Records as the second single from D'Arby's debut album, Introducing the Hardline According to Terence Trent D'Arby, the song went into heavy rotation on MTV and eventually topped the US Billboard Hot 100 chart, as well as the Canadian and Dutch charts.

D'Arby performed the song live at the 30th Annual Grammy Awards, where he lost the Grammy Award for Best New Artist to Jody Watley. When the single reached number one on the Billboard Hot 100, it had charted for 17 weeks, the longest progress to number one in the US charts since Eurythmics' "Sweet Dreams (Are Made of This)" in 1983.

== Critical reception ==
Ben Greenman of The New Yorker credits "Wishing Well", along with other D'Arby songs, with "[bringing] soul music into the eighties". Writing about D'Arby for AllMusic, Stephen Thomas Erlewine called the song "sparse funk", and noted how "Wishing Well" was his first major hit in the United States. Kathi Whalen of The Washington Post credited the song's chart success to D'Arby's combination of "'60s soul and pop on top", and called "Wishing Well" "bouncy".

== Track listings ==
UK and US 7-inch single; US cassette single

1. "Wishing Well" – 3:33
2. "Elevators & Hearts" – 4:41

UK and European 12-inch maxi-single

1. "Wishing Well" (Three Coins in a Fountain mix) – 6:14
2. "Wishing Well" – 3:33
3. "Elevators & Hearts" – 4:41

UK 12-inch maxi-single (The Darbinian Mix)

1. "Wishing Well" (The Darbinian Mix) – 8:44
2. "If You Let Me Stay" (Remix) – 3:14
3. "Elevators & Hearts" – 4:41

UK 12-inch maxi-single (limited-edition); US 12-inch maxi-single (The Cool in the Shade Mix)

1. "Wishing Well" (The Cool in the Shade Mix) – 7:50
2. "Wonderful World" – 3:56
3. "Elevators & Hearts" – 4:41

Europe 12-inch maxi-single (special edition)

1. "Wishing Well" (Three Coins in a Fountain mix) – 6:14
2. "Elevators & Hearts" – 4:41
3. "Wishing Well" (The Cool in the Shade Mix) – 7:50
4. "Wonderful World" – 3:56

== Charts ==
=== Weekly charts ===
Weekly chart performance for "Wishing Well"
Chart (1987–1988)	Peak position
Australia (Kent Music Report)	9
Austria (Ö3 Austria Top 40)	10
Belgium (Ultratop 50 Flanders)	13
Canada Top Singles (RPM)	1
Europe (European Hot 100 Singles)	14
France (SNEP)	14
Ireland (IRMA)	10
Italy Airplay (Music & Media)	15
Luxembourg (Radio Luxembourg)	2
Netherlands (Dutch Top 40)	1
Netherlands (Single Top 100)	3
New Zealand (Recorded Music NZ)	4
South Africa (Springbok Radio)	6
Switzerland (Schweizer Hitparade)	5
UK Singles (Official Charts)	4
US Billboard Hot 100	1
US Adult Contemporary (Billboard)	44
US Dance Club Songs (Billboard)	7
US Hot R&B/Hip-Hop Songs (Billboard)	1
West Germany (GfK)	18

=== Year-end charts ===
1987 year-end chart performance for "Wishing Well"
Chart (1987)	Rank
Australia (Kent Music Report)	53
Belgium (Ultratop)	35
Europe (European Hot 100 Singles)	40
Netherlands (Dutch Top 40)	27
Netherlands (Single Top 100)	25
UK Singles (OCC)	46

1988 year-end chart performance for "Wishing Well"
Chart (1988)	Rank
Canada Top Singles (RPM)	8
US Billboard Hot 100	12

== Certifications ==
Certifications and sales for "Wishing Well"
Region	Certification	Certified units/sales
United States (RIAA)	Gold	500,000^{^}
^{^} Shipments figures based on certification alone.

== Release history ==
Release dates and formats for "Wishing Well"
Region	Date	Format(s)	Label(s)	Ref.
United Kingdom	June 8, 1987	7-inch vinyl; 12-inch vinyl	CBS	
United Kingdom	June 22, 1987	Limited-edition 7-inch vinyl; 12-inch remix vinyl	CBS	
United Kingdom	June 29, 1987	Limited-edition 12-inch vinyl	CBS	
United States	January 1988	7-inch vinyl; 12-inch vinyl; cassette	Columbia	
Japan	January 21, 1988	12-inch vinyl	Epic	
