= Dance Little Sister (Terence Trent D'Arby song) =

Single by Terence Trent D'Arby

from the album Introducing the Hardline According to Terence Trent D'Arby
- Released: September 28, 1987
- Genre: Funk rock
- Length: 3:55 (Part One); 8:36 (Full Version)
- Label: CBS
- Songwriters: Terence Trent D'Arby; Sean Oliver; Rob Miller
- Producers: Terence Trent D'Arby; Martyn Ware

Terence Trent D'Arby singles chronology
"Wishing Well" (1987)	"Dance Little Sister" (1987)	"Sign Your Name" (1988)

"Dance Little Sister" is a song by Terence Trent D'Arby, the third single (fourth in the US) from the 1987 album Introducing the Hardline According to Terence Trent D'Arby.

The single reached the UK Top 20 as well as #30 on the Billboard Hot 100 chart in 1988. As was common for big-selling artists at that time, the singles were released in a plethora of limited editions on multiple formats, including a full eight and a half minute version (entitled "Part One and Two" on some releases), and a remix by Shep Pettibone, again released in a short (3:45) and long (8:45) version.

== Critical reception ==
Upon release columnist of Pan-European magazine Music & Media made a conclusion that this "hot James Brown like funk single will further boost sales" of D'Arby's debut album.

== Track listings ==
U.S. 7-inch single / U.S. cassette single / U.K. 7-inch single

1. "Dance Little Sister" (Part One) – 3:54
2. "Dance Little Sister" (Part Two) – 3:36

U.K. 12-inch maxi-single

1. "Dance Little Sister" (Parts One & Two) – 8:36
2. "Sunday Jam (One Woman Man)" – 3:31

U.K. cassette maxi-single

1. "Dance Little Sister" (Parts One & Two) – 8:36
2. "Sunday Jam (One Woman Man)" – 3:31
3. "Heartbreak Hotel" – 2:12

U.S. 12-inch maxi-single / Europe 12-inch maxi-single / Europe CD maxi-single

1. "Dance Little Sister" (Shep Pettibone Remix – Long version) – 8:45
2. "Dance Little Sister" (Shep Pettibone Remix – Short version) – 3:45
3. "Dance Little Sister" (Parts One & Two) – 8:36

== Charts ==
=== Weekly charts ===
Chart (1987–1988)	Peak position
Belgium (Ultratop 50 Flanders)	5
Europe (European Hot 100 Singles)	12
Ireland (IRMA)	12
Italy Airplay (Music & Media)	11
Luxembourg (Radio Luxembourg)	16
Netherlands (Dutch Top 40)	3
Netherlands (Single Top 100)	3
New Zealand (Recorded Music NZ)	4
Switzerland (Schweizer Hitparade)	12
UK Singles (Official Charts)	20
US Billboard Hot 100	30
US Dance Club Songs (Billboard)	7
US Hot R&B/Hip-Hop Songs (Billboard)	9
West Germany (GfK)	24

=== Year-end charts ===
Chart (1987)	Position
Belgium (Ultratop Flanders)	83
Netherlands (Dutch Top 40)	51
Netherlands (Single Top 100)	61
Chart (1988)	Position
Canada Dance/Urban (RPM)	18
