= Wildcard (Terence Trent D'Arby album) =

WildCard !

Studio album by Sananda Maitreya
- Released: October 11, 2001; June 3, 2003
- Recorded: 1998
- Genre: Post Millennium Rock, pop, rock
- Label: TreeHouse Publishing
- Producer: Sananda Maitreya

Sananda Maitreya chronology
Vibrator (1995)	WildCard ! (2001)	Angels & Vampires - Volume I (2005)

The Jokers' Edition

Wildcard (also known as Terence Trent D'Arby's WildCard!) is Terence Trent D'Arby's fifth album, and his final under that name. It was released in Europe on October 11, 2001, following a six-year absence from the music industry on his own independent record label, Treehouse Publishing. The album spawned two singles ("O'Divina" and "What Shall I Do?) and featured both his previous and new name on the cover.

== WildCard! - The Jokers' Edition ==
Professional ratings
Review scores
Source	Rating
Allmusic	4/5 stars
Blender	3/5 stars
Entertainment Weekly	B+

In the United Kingdom, the album was issued for the first time in February 2003 as Terence Trent D'Arby's WildCard! - The Jokers' Edition, with the album released by Maitreya's Sananda Records in a distribution deal with Universal. The back cover of the British version of The Jokers' Edition announced that the album was produced, written and arranged by Maitreya, marking the first time the artist solely used this name in the credits.

In June 2003, Wildcard was also repackaged in Europe as WildCard! - The Jokers' Edition with Sananda Maitreya being the only credited artist name in many European territories.

The Jokers' Edition omitted several songs from the previously released edition and replaced them with newly recorded songs, including a new single called "What Shall I Do?". When the album was released in the United Kingdom in 2003, it received a 4 star review in The Guardian by Caroline Sullivan, who said it was an "artful blend of soul, rock and funk" and a "snazzy comeback".

== Track listing ==
All tracks are written by Sananda Maitreya.

No.	Title	Length
1.	"O'Divina"	4:17
2.	"Designated Fool"	4:12
3.	"My Dark Places"	4:06
4.	"The Inner Scream"	4:24
5.	"SRR 636*"	3:43
6.	"Drivin' Me Crazy"	3:21
7.	"Suga Free"	3:52
8.	"Shalom"	3:43
9.	"Ev'rythang"	3:32
10.	"Love, Can You Hear Me?"	3:19
11.	"Sweetness"	3:13
12.	"Reflecting"	3:26
13.	"Be Willing"	3:36
14.	"Goodbye Diane"	4:37
15.	"...And They Will Never Know"	3:13
16.	"Sayin' About You"	3:49
17.	"Shadows"	4:18
18.	"Benediction: Sugar Ray"	3:25

Wildcard – Japanese edition
No.	Title	Length
19.	"Testify"	5:00

Wildcard – The Joker's Edition
No.	Title	Length
1.	"O'Divina"	4:17
2.	"Designated Fool"	4:12
3.	"My Dark Places"	4:06
4.	"The Inner Scream"	4:24
5.	"SRR 636*"	3:43
6.	"Drivin' Me Crazy"	3:21
7.	"Suga Free"	3:52
8.	"What Shall I Do?"	5:11
9.	"Testify"	4:53
10.	"Shalom"	3:43
11.	"Girl"	3:57
12.	"Ev'rythang"	3:32
13.	"Sweetness"	3:13
14.	"Some Birds Blue"	3:32
15.	"Be Willing"	3:36
16.	"Goodbye Diane"	4:37
17.	"...And They Will Never Know"	3:13
18.	"Sayin' About You"	3:49
19.	"Shadows"	4:18

== Charts ==
=== Weekly charts ===
Weekly chart performance for Wildcard!
Chart (2003)	Peak position
French Albums (SNEP)	130
