= Delicate (Terence Trent D'Arby song) =

1993 single by Terence Trent D'Arby

Single by Terence Trent D'Arby featuring Des'ree

from the album Symphony or Damn
- B-side: "She's My Baby"
- Released: June 7, 1993
- Genre: Jazz-pop; soul
- Length: 4:16
- Label: Columbia
- Songwriter: Terence Trent D'Arby
- Producer: Terence Trent D'Arby

Terence Trent D'Arby singles chronology
"Do You Love Me Like You Say?" (1993)	"Delicate" (1993)	"She Kissed Me" (1993)

Des'ree singles chronology
"Why Should I Love You" (1992)	"Delicate" (1993)	"You Gotta Be" (1994)

Music video
- "Delicate" on YouTube

"Delicate" is a song by American singer-songwriter Terence Trent D'Arby featuring English singer Des'ree, released on June 7, 1993, by Columbia Records as the third single from his third studio album, Symphony or Damn (1993). It was written, arranged and produced by D'Arby and peaked at number 14 on the UK Singles Chart. In the United States, the song reached numbers 74 and 65 on the Billboard Hot 100 and Cash Box Top 100, respectively. Its music video was directed by Andy Morahan.

== Critical reception ==
In a 2018 retrospective review, Patrick Corcoran from Albumism stated that "Delicate" "demonstrated that the delightful soul voice was still ready and primed for action in a song that lived up to its dainty title". Upon the release of the single, Larry Flick from Billboard magazine wrote, "With sweet vocal assistance by Des'ree, D'Arby is poised for his first top 40 hit in years. A tinkly jazz-pop shuffle beat and richly expressive vocals are the basis for an expansive retro-soul tune. Pretty and soothing track should also be of note to adult-geared urban and AC radio formats." In his weekly UK chart commentary, James Masterton named it "by far the best track on his new album and destined surely for Top 10 success next week". Andrew Smith from Melody Maker wrote, "'Sign Your Name' was a cute song and this one tries for the same lovelorn effect, without getting anywhere near it."

Pan-European magazine Music & Media commented, "Dueting with last year's soul revelation Des'ree, YID hits radioland completely K.O.. Count to 10, and try to recover after this exquisite ballad." Alan Jones from Music Week gave it a score of four out of five, writing, "An appropriate title for a sweet and soulful duet, this shuffling and summery song is destined for the Top 10." John Mulvey from NME said D'Arby "shakes off the dodgy Kravitzisms of his last single and rewrites 'Sign Your Name' to reclaim the upmarket smooch market." He added, "...but a hit, I suppose." People Magazine noted its "Middle Eastern lounge-jazz filigree", adding that "his sexy, edgy tenor is a voice that grabs you in all its guises." Siân Pattenden from Smash Hits also gave it four out of five. She felt that D'Arby "has come up with a truly corking pop single. 'Delicate' is a soft, ambling tune, as the tender sheen on the pedal of a pansy. It is very smooth and a bit girlie, making sensible people want to snog you." Charles Aaron from Spin named it a "exquisitely gooey single" and "a time-lapse synth-photo of a flower blooming".

== Music video ==
The official music video for the song was directed by British commercial, film and music video director Andy Morahan. It was produced by Warren Hewlett for State and released on June 7, 1993. The video features high definition morphing with D'Arby and Des'ree performing the song in a completely white setting.

== Track listings ==
- 7-inch and cassette
1. "Delicate" - 4:16
2. "She's My Baby" - 4:13
3. "Dance Little Sister" - 3:54
- CD single
1. "Delicate" – 4:16
2. "Dance Little Sister" – 3:54

== Personnel ==
- Written, arranged and produced by Terence Trent D'Arby
- Mixed by Mark "Spike" Stent
- Recorded by Craig Porteils

== Charts ==
=== Weekly charts ===
Weekly chart performance for "Delicate"
Chart (1993)	Peak position
Australia (ARIA)	99
Belgium (Ultratop 50 Flanders)	44
Europe (Eurochart Hot 100)	37
Europe (European Hit Radio)	4
France (SNEP)	22
Germany (GfK)	56
Iceland (Íslenski Listinn Topp 40)	10
Ireland (IRMA)	23
Netherlands (Dutch Top 40 Tipparade)	10
Netherlands (Single Top 100)	45
New Zealand (Recorded Music NZ)	20
Switzerland (Schweizer Hitparade)	34
UK Singles (OCC)	14
UK Airplay (Music Week)	4
US Billboard Hot 100	74
US Cash Box Top 100	65

=== Year-end charts ===
Year-end chart performance for "Delicate"
Chart (1993)	Position
Europe (European Hit Radio)	31
Iceland (Íslenski Listinn Topp 40)	81

== Release history ==
Region	Date	Format(s)	Label(s)	Ref.
United Kingdom	June 7, 1993	7-inch vinyl; CD; cassette	Columbia	
Japan	August 21, 1993	CD	Epic	
Australia	September 13, 1993	CD; cassette	Columbia	
