= Terence Trent D'Arby =

American singer (born 1962)

Sananda Maitreya
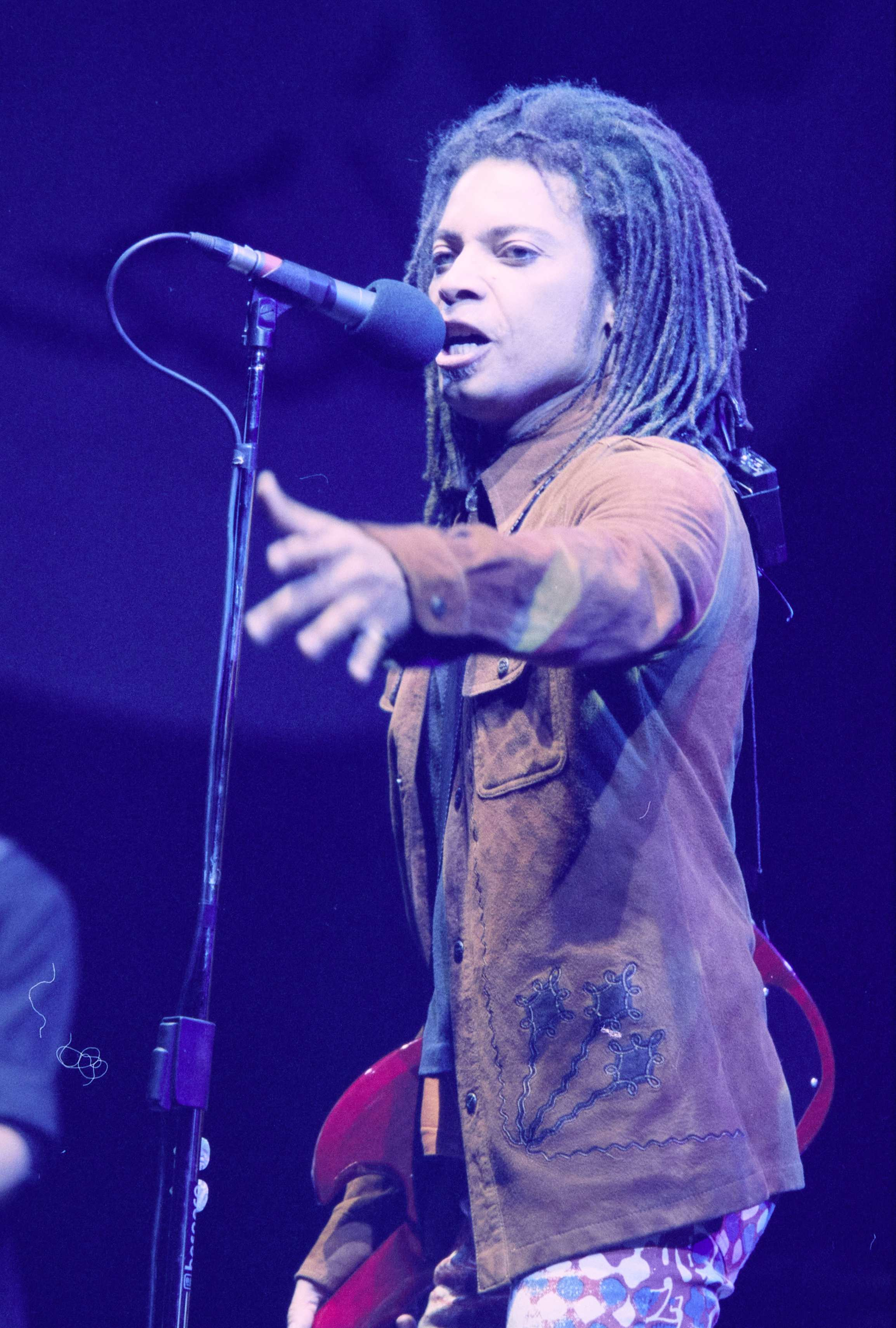
- Maitreya in 2003

Background information
- Born: Terence Trent Howard; March 15, 1962 (age 64); Manhattan, New York, US
- Genres: Pop; rock; progressive soul
- Occupations: Singer; songwriter
- Instruments: Vocals; piano; guitar; bass guitar; keyboards; drums; percussion; banjo; harmonica; organ
- Works: Terence Trent D'Arby discography
- Years active: 1984–present
- Labels: TreeHouse; Columbia
- Website: sanandamaitreya.com

Sananda Francesco Maitreya (born Terence Trent Howard; March 15, 1962), who started his career with the stage name Terence Trent D'Arby, is an American singer and songwriter who came to fame with his debut studio album, Introducing the Hardline According to Terence Trent D'Arby (1987). The album includes the singles "If You Let Me Stay", "Sign Your Name", "Dance Little Sister", and "Wishing Well". Maitreya is a multi-instrumentalist and noted for his soulful voice and flamboyant, charismatic and androgynous persona.

== Early life ==
Sananda Francesco Maitreya was born Terence Trent Howard in Manhattan, New York, in 1962 to a father of Scots-Irish and Native American descent and his mother, Frances Howard, is a gospel singer, teacher, and counselor. His biological father's name, according to an Instagram post dated June 5, 2024 commemorating his son Francesco Mingus' 14th birthday, was Robert Bell. Frances Howard married Bishop James Benjamin Darby, who became his stepfather and raised him. He took his stepfather's last name and later added the apostrophe.

In his youth, Maitreya resided in Daytona and in Deland, Florida. Maitreya trained as a boxer in nearby Orlando, Florida. In 1980, he won the Florida Golden Gloves lightweight championship. He received an offer to attend boxing school in the United States Army, but went to college instead. After enrolling at the University of Central Florida, he quit a year later.

== Career ==
After quitting college, he enlisted in the US Army. He was posted at Fort Sill, Oklahoma, and then served in the 3rd Armored Division near Frankfurt, West Germany. After going absent without leave during his military service, Maitreya left the Army in 1983. He later described the experience as a decisive turning point that led him to devote himself fully to music, the vocation that would define his future career. While in West Germany, he worked as a band leader with the band the Touch (de), releasing an album called Love on Time (1984) which was recorded in the studio of Frank Farian. It was re-issued (with four additional tracks) credited to The Touch With Terence Trent D'Arby in 1989 as Early Works after his worldwide success as a solo artist. In 1986, he left West Germany for London, where he briefly played with the Bojangles, who became his backing group on his 1988 tour. In London, he signed a recording contract with CBS Records.

=== as Terence Trent D'Arby ===
His debut solo album, as Terence Trent D'Arby, Introducing the Hardline According to Terence Trent D'Arby, was released in July 1987. The album produced hits including "If You Let Me Stay", "Sign Your Name", "Dance Little Sister", and the number one hit "Wishing Well".

In an interview, Maitreya played with the press and expressed a high opinion of his first album, claiming that it was the most important album since the Beatles' Sgt. Pepper's Lonely Hearts Club Band. After the comments leaked to American media outlets, he stated that most of what he said was exaggerated, but that it is sometimes necessary to "hit people over the head" to get their attention. The album earned him a Grammy Award in the category Best R&B Vocal Performance, Male (1989) and a BRIT Award for International Breakthrough Act, and he also received Grammy and Soul Train nominations for Best New Artist.

Maitreya's follow-up album, Neither Fish nor Flesh (1989), was very different from his debut, and though previous album producer Martyn Ware stated in a 2021 interview that the album was way ahead of its time, the album received mixed reviews upon release and achieved less commercial success than its predecessor, however, it has undergone critical reappraisal, with some writers describing it as an ambitious and misunderstood work. It took four more years and a move to Los Angeles until his next album, Symphony or Damn (1993), was released. The record contained the singles "Delicate" and "She Kissed Me". It peaked at No. 4 on the UK Albums Chart. The album's closing track "Let Her Down Easy" was covered by George Michael and released as the first single and video from his 2014 album Symphonica. Michael's version appeared on the UK pop chart at number 53, its peak position.

In 1995, Maitreya released Vibrator, which was followed by a world tour. It featured the single "Holding on to You".

Maitreya's music has been included on several movie and television soundtracks. He sang the theme song of 1991's Frankie & Johnny. "Right Thing, Wrong Way" featured in the end credits of Beverly Hills Cop III. "What Shall I Do?" was featured in an episode of the UPN television series Girlfriends. He sang the ending song, "Letting Go", in the 1996 film The Fan. Maitreya's songs were also used in Prêt-à-Porter and the 1995 miniseries The Promised Land.

In 1999, Maitreya collaborated with INXS to replace his friend, the late vocalist Michael Hutchence, so the band could play at the official opening of Stadium Australia.

=== as Sananda Maitreya ===
D'Arby legally changed his name to Sananda Maitreya on October 4, 2001, explaining "Terence Trent D'Arby was dead ... he watched his suffering as he died a noble death. After intense pain I meditated for a new spirit, a new will, a new identity." Maitreya has said that his name change resulted from a series of dreams he had in 1995. Though the name does not have any religious significance, Maitreya explained that he understood it to mean "rebirth" in Sanskrit. Sānanda (सानन्द) means 'possessed of happiness', and maitreya (मैत्रेय) means 'friendly, kind, loving, benevolent'.

From 2001 onward, Maitreya pursued an independent artistic path through his TreeHouse Publishing label, releasing thirteen studio albums and six live recordings as of 2026. In interviews, he has spoken about his estrangement from the mainstream music industry following the reception of his more experimental work and his decision to prioritize artistic independence over commercial considerations.

2001 also marked the release of the Wildcard album. Initially downloadable for free from the artist's official website, the album received great support from international critics in particular for its single, the song "O Divina". At the beginning of 2002, Maitreya moved to Milan for love, where he married Italian architect and TV presenter Francesca Francone in 2003, and began his sixth project, Angels & Vampires - Volume I. The artist initially published the project on the official website in chapters, as the recordings continued, then released it on June 29, 2005, in MP3 format.

In July 2005, Maitreya began the second volume of the project: Angels & Vampires - Volume II, continuing the division into chapters. On April 29, 2006, the second mastered volume was published. The Angels & Vampires album contains 40 songs, including a cover of "Angie", a tribute to the Rolling Stones. The genre of the album is post-millennium rock. Maitreya played all the instruments during the recordings and produced, wrote, and arranged the entire project by himself.

In 2007, three of his songs were played in Judd Apatow's film Knocked Up.

After the 2007 European tour, new concerts followed in 2008, and television participation in the 2008 Christmas concert. In addition to the studio albums, Maitreya has released four live albums from 2007 to 2012: Influenza in Firenze, Camels at the Crossroads, Lovers & Fighters, and Confessions of a Zooathaholic, a selection of the best songs from live concerts and tours performed in the same year.

Maitreya released Nigor Mortis in 2008, which followed the same evolutionary process as Angels & Vampires. The album was first published in chapters during the recordings, and then came out in the mastered version at the end of 2008 and is available on CD and MP3 at his website. The Sphinx album was released in March 2011; in the same month the instrumental version of The Sphinx and the new live album by the artist related to the 2010 concerts of the Post Millennium Rock: Confessions of a Zooathaholic has been released. In March 2013, Return to Zooathalon was released, followed in 2015 by the double album The Rise of the Zugebrian Time Lords. 2017 marked the release of a monumental work: Prometheus & Pandora, 53 songs divided into three volumes. The artist declared that this album has become so important and impressive because through music he has elaborated the mourning for the loss of his great friends and idols, David Bowie, Prince, George Michael, and Tom Petty.

In December 2020, a new live album, Some Sake in Osaka, was released. It showcases a Japan tour with his historic American band. On March 15, 2021, Maitreya released his 12th studio album, Pandora's PlayHouse, which included three collaborations, the song "Reflecting Light", composed with the Australian duo The Avalanches; "Time Is On My Side" with Irene Grandi and the opening song of the project: "Pandora's Plight" with jazz pianist Antonio Faraò. The project has an instrumental song called "Prince", which honors the memory and the friendship of Maitreya and Prince.

In 2022, he was featured on Calvin Harris' new Love Regenerator track "Lonely" (a record which Harris recorded with Italian producer Riva Starr), with the vocals coming from 1989's "...And I Need to Be with Someone Tonight".

In July 2022, Sony UK released the spatial audio and remastered version of his first album, changing the title to Introducing the Hardline According to... and the artist name to Sananda Maitreya. The entire discography featuring the artistic name Terence Trent D'Arby was renamed to Sananda Maitreya in 2021 by Sony.

In 2023, the documentary film Welcome to the MadHouse: The Costa Rica Sessions was released. The film won two awards at international festivals, such as the Kiez Berlin Festival, the International Gold Awards and received two special mentions at the Los Angeles Core Independent Film Festival and International Documentary Film Festival. A live album containing the film soundtrack, Welcome to the MadHouse, was released in January 2023. On 11 May 2024, Maitreya released his thirteenth studio album, The Pegasus Project: Pegasus & The Swan, a 41-track double album that completed the trilogy begun with Prometheus & Pandora and continued with Pandora's PlayHouse. In 2025, Maitreya released The Pegasus Project Live, a live album documenting material from his 2024 european live tour. In 2026, he released SMNUK'25 !, a live album recorded during his 2025 UK tour, alongside the concert film Shepherd's Pie. The releases documented his return to British stages after more than two decades.

Also in 2026, Sony Music UK, Music On Vinyl and TreeHouse Publishing released JUVENILIA: The Columbia Years, a retrospective six-LP box set collecting newly remastered editions of Maitreya's first four studio albums: Introducing the Hardline, Neither Fish Nor Flesh, Symphony or Damn and Vibrator.

== Private life ==
Maitreya has a daughter, London-based musician Seraphina Simone, born in December 1988.

Maitreya had an affair with television presenter and writer Paula Yates, who was separating from her then husband Bob Geldof at the time.

Maitreya married Italian television host and architect Francesca Francone in 2003. They have two sons.

== Awards and nominations ==
Award	Year	Nominee(s)	Category	Result	Ref.
MTV Video Music Awards	1988	"Wishing Well"	Best Male Video	Nominated	
MTV Video Music Awards	1993	"She Kissed Me"	Breakthrough Video	Nominated	
MTV Video Music Awards	1993	"She Kissed Me"	Best Special Effects	Nominated	

== Discography ==
=== as Terence Trent D'Arby ===
- Introducing the Hardline According to Terence Trent D'Arby (1987)
- Neither Fish nor Flesh (1989)
- Symphony or Damn (1993)
- Vibrator (1995)
- Wildcard (2001)

=== as Sananda Maitreya ===
- Angels & Vampires – Volume I (2005)
- Angels & Vampires – Volume II (2006)
- Nigor Mortis (2009)
- The Sphinx (2011)
- Return to Zooathalon (2013)
- The Rise of the Zugebrian Time Lords (2015)
- Prometheus & Pandora (2017)
- Pandora's PlayHouse (2021)
- The Pegasus Project: Pegasus & The Swan (2024)

== Filmography ==
as Terence Trent D'Arby

- 1984: Schulmädchen '84 (feature film directed by Nikolai Müllerschön)
- 1993: Heimat II: A Chronicle of a Generation (TV series, 1 episode, "Kennedys Kinder")
- 1999: Shake, Rattle and Roll: An American Love Story as Jackie Wilson (TV mini-series)
- 1999: Clubland as Toby (feature film directed by Mary Lambert)
- 2000: Static Shock (TV series, 1 episode, "They're Playing My Song" as DJ Rock)

as Sananda Maitreya

- 2024: Beatles '64 (documentary film directed by David Tedeschi)

== See also ==
- Brit Awards 1989
- 31st Annual Grammy Awards
- List of artists who reached number one in the United States
- List of UK Albums Chart number ones of the 1980s
