= Introducing the Hardline According to Terence Trent D'Arby =

Studio album by Terence Trent D'Arby
- Released: July 13, 1987
- Recorded: 1986–1987
- Genres: Funk rock; soul
- Length: 47:11
- Label: Columbia
- Producers: Martyn Ware; Terence Trent D'Arby; Howard Gray

Terence Trent D'Arby chronology
Introducing the Hardline According to Terence Trent D'Arby (1987)	Neither Fish nor Flesh (1989)

Singles from Introducing the Hardline According to Terence Trent D'Arby
- 1. "If You Let Me Stay" Released: February 1987; 2. "Wishing Well" Released: June 1987; 3. "Dance Little Sister" Released: September 1987; 4. "Sign Your Name" Released: December 1987; 5. "Rain (remix)" Released: April 1988 (EU)

Introducing the Hardline According to Terence Trent D'Arby is the debut studio album by Terence Trent D'Arby. It was first released in the United Kingdom on July 13, 1987, on Columbia Records, and debuted at number one there, spending a total of nine weeks (non-consecutively) at the top of the UK Albums Chart. It also hit number one in Switzerland and number two in New Zealand and The Netherlands. It was eventually certified 5× Platinum (for sales of 1.5 million copies). Worldwide, the album sold a million copies within the first three days of going on sale.

The album was also a hit in the US, although its success was slower. It was released there in October 1987, eventually peaking at number four on May 7, 1988, – the same week that the single "Wishing Well" hit number one on the US Billboard Hot 100. It reached number one on the Billboard R&B Albums chart around the same time.

Other singles from the album included "If You Let Me Stay", which was a top-ten hit in the UK, and "Sign Your Name", which reached number four on the Billboard Hot 100 and number two in the UK. A fourth single, "Dance Little Sister", reached the UK top 20 as well. As was common for artists at that time, the singles were released as extended versions in multiple formats. These were bolstered by a multitude of non-album studio and live tracks.

The album is titled on streaming music sites as Introducing the Hardline According to Sananda Maitreya, reflecting D'Arby's name change to Sananda Maitreya.

== Reception ==
Professional ratings
Review scores
Source	Rating
AllMusic	4/5 stars
The Encyclopedia of Popular Music	4/5 stars
The Philadelphia Inquirer	3/4 stars
Q	3/5 stars
The Rolling Stone Album Guide	3.5/5 stars
The Village Voice	B+

The pan-European magazine Music & Media named Introdcing the Hardline as one of its "albums of the week" in the issue dated 1 August 1987.

== Commercial Performance ==
=== Europe ===
In the United Kingdom the album debuted at number one in the week dated 19 July 1987. Its success continued with over 100,000 orders for the album in its second week, and CBS Records spokesman Jonathan Morrish commented that it was "possibly the fastest-selling debut album that we have ever had in the UK". Following the success of the single "Sign Your Name" the album returned back to the top of the charts for a further eight consecutive weeks. The album stayed in the top 100 of the UK albums chart for sixty-five weeks, including twenty-three in the top 10. The album was certified 5× Platinum in September 1988 for sales of 1.5 million copies.

In its first week of release, the album was the third most played album on European radio according to the pan-European magazine Music & Media. It later became the most played album in Europe for the week dated August 22, 1987.

=== North America ===
In the United States, the album entered the Billboard 200 in week dated October 24, 1987 and would stay on the chart for sixty weeks, with its highest chart position being number 4 in the week dated May 7, 1988. In November 1988, the album was certified double platinum by the Recording Industry Association of America for shipment of two million copies.

In Canada the album debuted at number 95 on the RPM albums chart dated December 5, 1987. After twenty weeks on the chart, the album peaked at number 4 in the week dated April 30, 1988. The album was certified double platinum in Canada in May 1988.

== Legacy ==
The album was included in the book 1001 Albums You Must Hear Before You Die. In 2012, journalist Daryl Easlea said the album was crystallized as Trent's moment, "a soundtrack to the turning point when the 80s turned from austerity to prosperity. It's as central to that decade as the much-seen image of the city trader waving his wad of banknotes to the camera. It remains one big, infectiously glorious record."

== Track listing ==
All tracks written by D'Arby, except where noted.

1. "If You All Get to Heaven" – 5:17
2. "If You Let Me Stay" – 3:14
3. "Wishing Well" (D'Arby, Sean Oliver) – 3:30
4. "I'll Never Turn My Back on You (Father's Words)" – 3:37
5. "Dance Little Sister" – 3:55
6. "Seven More Days" – 4:32
7. "Let's Go Forward" – 5:32
8. "Rain" – 2:58
9. "Sign Your Name" – 4:37
10. "As Yet Untitled" – 5:33
11. "Who's Loving You" (William "Smokey" Robinson) – 4:24

== Personnel ==
- Terence Trent D'Arby – lead vocals (1–8, 11), backing vocals (1–7), keyboards (1, 3, 6, 7), drums (1, 7), percussion (2–7), baritone saxophone (3), acoustic piano (4, 5), clavinet (5), string arrangements (7, 9), all vocals (9, 10), all instruments (9, 10)
- Nick Plytas – keyboards (2, 6, 7), Hammond organ (5)
- Andy Whitmore – keyboards (4, 5, 8, 11)
- Pete Glenister – guitar (1–4, 6)
- Christian Marsac – guitar (4, 5, 8, 11), saxophone (11)
- "Blast" Murray – guitar (4, 5, 8, 11)
- Tim Cansfield – guitar (7)
- Sean Oliver – bass guitar (2, 6)
- Phil Spalding – bass guitar (3, 7)
- Cass Lewis – bass guitar (4, 5, 8, 11)
- Bruce Smith – drums (2, 6)
- Preston Heyman – percussion (1, 7), drums (3)
- Frank Ricotti – percussion (2, 6)
- Clive Mngaza – hi-hat (3), drums (4, 5, 8, 11)
- Ivar Ybrad – sinubla (7)
- Mel Collins – saxophone (5)
- Chris Cameron – string scoring (9)
- Glenn Gregory – backing vocals (1)
- Lance Ellington – backing vocals (2, 6)
- Tony Jackson – backing vocals (2, 6)
- Frank Collins – backing vocals (8, 11)
- Ebo Ross – backing vocals (8, 11)

The 'Shout It Out' Reply Vocal Chorale Ensemble on "Dance Little Sister"

- Terence Trent D'Arby, Phil Legg, Michele Oldland and Martyn Ware

== Production ==
- Terence Trent D'Arby – producer (1, 3–5, 7–11), arrangements (1–10)
- Martyn Ware – producer (1, 3–5, 7–11)
- Howard Gray – producer (2, 6)
- Phil "Foghorn" Legg – recording, mixing
- Michael H. Brauer – remixing (2), additional overdubs (2)
- Peter Barrett – sleeve design
- Andrew Biscomb – additional sleeve design
- Sheila Rock – photography

== Charts ==
=== Weekly charts ===
Chart (1987–1988)	Peak position
Australian Albums (ARIA)	1
Austrian Albums (Ö3 Austria)	4
Canadian Albums (RPM)	4
Dutch Albums (Album Top 100)	2
European Albums (Music & Media)	1
Finnish Albums (Suomen virallinen lista)	4
German Albums (Offizielle Top 100)	4
Italian Albums (Musica e dischi)	6
New Zealand Albums (RMNZ)	2
Norwegian Albums (VG-lista)	4
Swedish Albums (Sverigetopplistan)	5
Swiss Albums (Schweizer Hitparade)	1
UK Albums (Official Charts)	1
US Billboard 200	4
US Top R&B/Hip-Hop Albums (Billboard)	1

=== Year-end charts ===
Chart (1987)	Position
Austrian Albums (Ö3 Austria)	21
Dutch Albums (Album Top 100)	20
European Albums (Music & Media)	22
German Albums (Offizielle Top 100)	32
New Zealand Albums (RMNZ)	19
Swiss Albums (Schweizer Hitparade)	7
UK Albums (OCC)	16

Chart (1988)	Position
Australian Albums (ARIA)	8
Austrian Albums (Ö3 Austria)	12
Canadian Albums (RPM)	14
Dutch Albums (Album Top 100)	5
European Albums (Music & Media)	4
German Albums (Offizielle Top 100)	9
Swiss Albums (Schweizer Hitparade)	8
UK Albums (OCC)	8
US Billboard 200	11
US Top R&B/Hip-Hop Albums (Billboard)	4

== Certifications and sales ==
Region	Certification	Certified units/sales
Australia	—	230,000
Brazil	—	95,000
Canada (Music Canada)	2× Platinum	200,000^{^}
Finland (Musiikkituottajat)	Gold	29,843
France (SNEP)	Platinum	300,000^{*}
Germany (BVMI)	Platinum	500,000^{^}
Italy	—	470,000
Netherlands (NVPI)	3× Platinum	300,000^{^}
New Zealand (RMNZ)	Platinum	15,000^{^}
Spain (Promusicae)	Platinum	100,000^{^}
Sweden (GLF)	Platinum	100,000^{^}
Switzerland (IFPI Switzerland)	2× Platinum	100,000^{^}
United Kingdom (BPI)	5× Platinum	1,721,685
United States (RIAA) video	Gold	50,000^{^}
United States (RIAA)	2× Platinum	2,000,000^{^}
Summaries
Europe 1987-1988 sales	—	4,000,000
Worldwide	—	8,000,000
^{*} Sales figures based on certification alone.^{^} Shipments figures based on certification alone.

== Awards and nominations ==
- 1987 – Music & Media (The Jury Report): Debut Album of the Year
- 1987 – Music & Media (DJ Awards): Male Artist of the Year
- 1987 – Music & Media (DJ Awards): Most Promising Act of the Year (International)
- 1988 – Soul Train and Grammy Award nomination for Best New Artist
- 1988 – BRIT Awards International Breakthrough Act – Terence Trent D'Arby
- 1988 – Grammy Awards Best Male R&B Vocal Performance
- 1988 – Music Week Top Dance Album (Second Place)

== See also ==
- List of number-one R&B albums of 1988 (U.S.)
- List of number-one albums from the 1980s (UK)
- Number-one albums of 1988 (Australia)
