= Why Should I Love You? (disambiguation) =

Why Should I Love You? is the name of multiple songs:

- "Why Should I Love You?" from the album The Red Shoes by Kate Bush
- "Why Should I Love You?" by The Harptones
- "Why Should I Love You?" from the album Glad Music by Stevie Moore
- "Why Should I Love You?" by The Four Lads
- "Why Should I Love You" from the album Mind Adventures by Des'ree
