= Dream Soldier =

Studio album by Des'ree
- Released: 31 March 2003
- Studio: Abbey Road Studios and Sony Music Studios (London, UK); Olympic Studios (Barnes, West London, UK); Stargate Studios (Norway)
- Genre: R&B; soul; pop
- Length: 46:01
- Label: Epic; 550; Sony Soho Square
- Producer: Kevin Bacon; Jonathan Quarmby; Stargate

Des'ree chronology
Endangered Species (2000)	Dream Soldier (2003)	A Love Story (2019)

Singles from Dream Soldier
- 1. "It's Okay" Released: 24 March 2003

Dream Soldier is the fourth album by British soul singer-songwriter Des'ree. It was released on 31 March 2003 on the Sony Soho Square record label, and features the UK top 75 single "It's Okay". For sixteen years, it was the last studio album released by Des'ree, with 2019's A Love Story marking her return to music. Dream Soldier was her only studio album to be released in the 2000s.

== Background ==
Dream Soldier peaked at number 77 on the Swiss Hitparade. Following this album's lukewarm commercial response, she was soon dropped by Sony, her label. Des'ree didn't release any new music until 2019.

== Critical reception ==
Professional ratings
Review scores
Source	Rating
Allmusic	3.5/5 stars
The Guardian	1/5 stars

Jon O'Brien of Allmusic claimed, "Despite a string of inspirational, transatlantic '90s hit singles and a deep sensual voice which stood up to comparisons with the likes of Anita Baker and Roberta Flack, South London vocalist Des'ree had become more renowned for her much-maligned "ghost, most, toast" rhymes of "Life" than her melodic soul-pop sound by the time of her fourth album, Dream Soldier. Five years on from 1998's Supernatural, the Brit Award-winner certainly hadn't let the constant flack deter her from pursuing her rather innocent, nursery rhyme-esque lyrical stance...Although Dream Soldier may descend into pleasant background music territory, it's still a welcome if sometimes slightly awkward return from the artist with the sunniest disposition in pop."

Dorian Lynskey of The Guardian disdainfully wrote "No matter what the past decade has done to the pop landscape, Des'ree has continued to produce one album of platitudinous, comfort-blanket soul after another. You can't fault her for consistency. You can, however, fault her for making terrible records such as Dream Soldier.

== Singles ==
Due to the poor commercial performance of the album, only one single was released from Dream Soldier. "It's Okay", which featured a radio mix by Stargate, was released on 24 March 2003, peaking at number 19 on the UK R&B Singles Chart, and number 69 on the official UK singles chart. The music video, directed by Jake Nava, was shot in London's Notting Hill. The single did not chart in the United States.

== Track listing ==
Worldwide edition

No.	Title	Writer(s)	Length
1.	"It's Okay"	Des'ree, Karlos Edwards	3:35
2.	"Why?"	Des'ree, Prince Sampson	4:19
3.	"Righteous Night"	Des'ree, Sampson	4:12
4.	"Doesn't Matter"	Des'ree, Michael Graves	4:16
5.	"Human"	Des'ree, Kevin Bacon, Jonathan Quarmby	4:15
6.	"Cool Morning"	Des'ree, Sampson	4:16
7.	"Something Special"	Des'ree, Sampson	4:28
8.	"Love Beautiful"	Des'ree, Graves	4:14
9.	"Nothing to Lose"	Des'ree, Dave Mundy	3:53
10.	"Fate"	Des'ree, Sampson, Tim Atack	5:16
11.	"It's Okay" (Stargate Radio Edit)	Des'ree, Edwards	3:27

Japanese bonus track
No.	Title	Writer(s)	Length
12.	"Holding on for Dear Life"	Des'ree, Atack	5:40

== Credits ==
=== Personnel ===
- Des'ree – vocals, backing vocals (1–4, 9–11)
- Jonathan Quarmby – keyboards (1–10)
- Mikkel S. Eriksen – instruments (11)
- Tor Erik Hermassen – instruments (11)
- Hallgeir Rustan – instruments (11)
- Mark Sheridan – guitars (1, 3–6, 9, 10), mandolin (3)
- Prince Sampson – guitars (2, 7)
- Keith Nelson – banjo (2)
- Kevin Bacon – bass (1–5, 8–10)
- Ali Friend – double bass (6, 7)
- Andy Gangadeen – drums (3)
- Andy Cook – drums (5)
- Andrew Small – drums (7, 10)
- Chris Bailey – drums (9)
- Thomas Dyani – percussion (10)
- James T. Ford – bagpipes (3)
- Brendan Power – harmonica (5, 8)
- Skaila Kanga – harp (6)
- Henrik Linnemann – flute (9)
- The London Metropolitan Orchestra – strings (1–9)
- Wil Malone – string arrangements (1–5, 8, 9)
- Pete Cobin – string arrangements (6, 7)
- Michael Kamen – string arrangements (6, 7)
- Chris Ballin – backing vocals (1, 3, 11)
- Derek Green – backing vocals (1, 3, 11)

=== Production ===
- Stargate – producers (1, 11)
- Kevin Bacon – producer (2–10, 12)
- Des'ree – producer (2–10)
- Jonathan Quarmby – producer (2–10, 12)
- Stylorouge – art direction, design
- Eva Mueller – photography
- The Outside Organisation – management

Technical credits

- Ray Staff – mastering
- Mike Ross – engineer (1)
- Kevin Bacon – mixing (1–10, 12)
- Jonathan Quarmby – mixing (1–10, 12)
- Alex Scannell – string engineer (2, 4, 8, 9), assistant engineer
- Stargate – remixing (11)
- Simon Changer – assistant engineer

== Charts ==
Chart (2003)	Peak position
Swiss Hitparade	77
