= Endangered Species (Des'ree album) =

Compilation album by Des'ree
- Released: 2000
- Genre: Soul, R&B
- Length: 58:35
- Label: Sony Soho Square

Des'ree chronology
Supernatural (1998)	Endangered Species (2000)	Dream Soldier (2003)

Endangered Species: A Compilation of Rare and Obscure Tracks is a 2000 compilation album by British singer-songwriter Des'ree. As suggested by its title, it is not a greatest hits, but a collection of assorted B-sides, songs from soundtracks, and live versions of hits from her first three albums.

The album comprises five B-side tracks from her various single releases, five live recordings, an acoustic mix of "I Ain't Movin'", the song "Silent Hero"—recorded for the 1995 film Clockers—and the previously unreleased track "Soul Mates". At the time of its release, Des'ree was taking time off from music to focus on her private life and the making of Dream Soldier, and therefore did not promote the album. Endangered Species did not chart.

== Track listing ==
1. "Silent Hero" 5:04
2. "Get A Life" 3:31
3. "I Ain't Movin' (Family Stand Acoustic Mix)" 4:06
4. "Innocent & Naive" 3:41
5. "Warm Hands, Cold Heart (2000 Mix)" 4:39
6. "I Ain't Movin' (Live)" 5:20
7. "Little Child (Live)" 3:52
8. "Looking Philosophical" 4:11
9. "Caring World" 4:13
10. "Soul Mates" 3:53
11. "Feel So High (Live In London)" 4:50
12. "You Gotta Be (Live In London)" 5:13
13. "Life (Live In London)" 6:04
