= I Ain't Movin' =

Studio album by Des'ree
- Released: 9 May 1994
- Studios: A-Pawling Studios (Pawling, New York); Neptune Factor Studios (Carmel, New York)
- Genres: Pop; R&B; progressive soul
- Length: 48:11 (UK/original Australian editions); 52:04 (US/Australian reissue editions)
- Labels: Epic; 550
- Producers: Des'ree; Ashley Ingram; Phil Legg; Peter Lord Moreland & V. Jeffrey Smith; Mark "Spike" Stent

Des'ree chronology
Mind Adventures (1992)	I Ain't Movin' (1994)	Supernatural (1998)

Alternate cover
- Cover for the American and Australian editions

Singles from I Ain't Movin'
- 1. "You Gotta Be" Released: 28 March 1994 Re-released: 27 February 1995; 2. "I Ain't Movin'" Released: 6 June 1994; 3. "Little Child" Released: 22 August 1994

Professional ratings
Review scores
Source	Rating
AllMusic	4/5 stars
Chicago Tribune	3/4 stars
Robert Christgau	(neither)
Music Week	3/5 stars
NME	5/10
Select	2/5 medals

I Ain't Movin' is the second studio album by British soul singer-songwriter Des'ree. It was released on 9 May 1994 in the UK, and 5 July 1994 in the US by 550 Music and Epic Records, and features the top 5 smash hit, "You Gotta Be".

== Critical reception ==
Tom Demalon of AllMusic gave the album 4 out of 5 stars, writing that "Des'ree possesses a pleasing vocal delivery, and it serves her well on songs like the slinky, mid-tempo 'Feel So High,' the breezy 'Little Child,' the hypnotic groove of 'Trip on Love' and the confessional title cut." Alan Jones from Music Week noted that the album have "a warm glow generated by her folksy songs and soulful voice." He also named it "a companion piece", with a "blend of sharply-observed lyrics and boundary challenging songs." Ian McCann from NME rated it five out of ten, commenting, "I Ain't Movin', largely produced by another British soul pioneer, Ashley Ingram, gleams like Bill Clinton's teeth and seeps into your room like rich spring sunshine."

== Singles ==
Three singles were released from I Ain't Movin: "You Gotta Be", "I Ain't Movin'" and "Little Child". In the US, "Feel So High" was featured on and released as a single from I Ain't Movin' rather than from Des'ree's debut album Mind Adventures. The song was added to the re-issue of the UK edition of the album, which was released in 2000. "You Gotta Be" was also remixed and re-released in the UK in 1995. The "Kissing You" single was included as a bonus CD with the Australian reissue of the album in 1997.

== Track listing ==
No.	Title	Writer(s)	Length
1.	"Herald the Day"	Des'ree, Jimmy S. Haynes	5:18
2.	"Crazy Maze"	Des'ree, Peter Lord Moreland, Vernon Jeffrey Smith	4:36
3.	"You Gotta Be"	Des'ree, Ashley Ingram	4:06
4.	"Little Child"	Des'ree, Ingram	3:54
5.	"Strong Enough"	Des'ree, Moreland, Smith	4:42
6.	"Trip on Love"	Des'ree, Moreland, Smith	4:28
7.	"I Ain't Movin'"	Des'ree, Haynes	4:22
8.	"Living in the City"	Des'ree, Ingram	4:31
9.	"In My Dreams"	Des'ree, Haynes	4:14
10.	"Love Is Here"	Des'ree, Ingram	4:50
11.	"I Ain't Movin'" (Percussion Reprise)	Des'ree, Haynes	3:10

UK re-issue bonus track (2000)
No.	Title	Writer(s)	Length
12.	"Feel So High"	Des'ree, Michael Graves	3:53

US edition
No.	Title	Writer(s)	Length
1.	"You Gotta Be"	Des'ree, Ashley Ingram	4:06
2.	"Crazy Maze"	Des'ree, Peter Lord Moreland, Vernon Jeffrey Smith	4:36
3.	"Feel So High"	Des'ree, Michael Graves	3:53
4.	"Little Child"	Des'ree, Ingram	3:54
5.	"Strong Enough"	Des'ree, Moreland, Smith	4:42
6.	"Herald the Day"	Des'ree, Jimmy S. Haynes	5:18
7.	"Trip on Love"	Des'ree, Moreland, Smith	4:28
8.	"I Ain't Movin'"	Des'ree, Haynes	4:22
9.	"Living in the City"	Des'ree, Ingram	4:31
10.	"In My Dreams"	Des'ree, Haynes	4:14
11.	"Love Is Here"	Des'ree, Ingram	4:50
12.	"I Ain't Movin'" (Percussion Reprise)	Des'ree, Haynes	3:10

== Personnel ==
Credits adapted from the album's liner notes.

=== Musicians ===
- Des'ree – vocals, backing vocals
- Peter Lord Moreland – keyboards (1, 2, 5, 6), guitars (6)
- V. Jeffrey Smith – keyboards (1, 2, 5, 6), drum programming (1, 6), guitars (5, 6), percussion (5)
- Ashley Ingram – keyboards (3, 4, 7, 9), bass (3, 4, 7–9), string arrangements (3, 7, 10), guitars (4, 7), Fender Rhodes (8), additional keyboards (8), backing vocals (8), additional programming (9), acoustic piano (10)
- Tom "T-Bone" Wolk – guitars (1, 2)
- Prince Sampson – guitars (4, 7, 8)
- Jimmy Haynes – guitars (9)
- Tracy Wormworth – bass (2, 6)
- Peter Moshay – drum programming (1)
- Rocky Bryant – drums (2, 5, 6)
- Kevin Clarke – drum programming (3)
- Norman Hedman – percussion (1)
- Bashiri Johnson – percussion (2)
- Harry Morgan – percussion (4)
- Thomas Dianni – percussion (7, 8)
- Nick Ingham – string score (10)
- Michael Sinclair – backing vocals (8)

=== Production ===
- Des'ree – producer (1–11)
- Peter Lord Moreland – producer (1, 2, 5, 6)
- V. Jeffrey Smith – producer (1, 2, 5, 6)
- Ashley Ingram – producer (3, 4, 7, 8, 10–12)
- Mark "Spike" Stent – producer (9)
- Phil Legg – additional production (12)
- Creative Hands – art direction, design
- Marcus Tomlinson – photography
- David Wernham – management

Technical credits

- Peter Moshay – recording engineer (1, 2, 5, 6), mix engineer (1, 2, 5, 6)
- V. Jeffrey Smith – recording engineer (1, 2, 5, 6)
- Mark "Spike" Stent – mixing (3, 4, 8)
- Charlie Smith – engineer (7, 11), mixing (7, 11)
- Richard Lengyel – engineer (10), mixing (10)
- Phil Legg – mixing (12)

== Charts ==
Chart (1994–1995)	Peak position
Australian Albums (ARIA)	14
Dutch Albums (Album Top 100)	77
German Albums (Offizielle Top 100)	91
New Zealand Albums (RMNZ)	9
Scottish Albums (Official Charts)	83
UK Albums (Official Charts)	13
US Billboard 200	27

== Certifications and sales ==
Region	Certification	Certified units/sales
Australia (ARIA)	Gold	35,000^{^}
United Kingdom (BPI)	Silver	60,000^{^}
United States (RIAA)	Platinum	1,000,000^{^}
Summaries
Worldwide	—	1,500,000
^{^} Shipments figures based on certification alone.
