= Feel So High =

1991 single by Des'ree

- 1991 original single cover

Single by Des'ree

from the album Mind Adventures and I Ain't Movin'
- Released: 19 August 1991
- Genre: Pop; soul
- Length: 3:52
- Label: Sony Soho Square; Epic
- Songwriters: Des'ree; Michael Graves
- Producer: Ashley Ingram

Des'ree singles chronology
"Feel So High" (1991)	"Mind Adventures" (1992)

Alternative cover
- US 1995 single cover

Music video
- "Feel So High" on YouTube

"Feel So High" is a song by British singer-songwriter Des'ree, released in August 1991 by Sony Soho Square and Epic Records as the first single from her debut album, Mind Adventures (1992). The song was co-written by Des'ree with Michael Graves, and produced by Ashley Ingram. It received critical acclaim, peaking at No. 13 in the UK, and No. 67 and 38 on the US Billboard Hot 100 and the US Cash Box Top 100. Three different music videos were produced to promote the single.

== Background ==
Ashley Ingram, who eventually produced "Feel So High" and most of the album, said that "[Lincoln Elias] played me a very rough demo of the song that later became 'Feel So High.' It's not often that a singer can present a demo tape and expect the powers-that-be to acknowledge the full wonders, but on a creative level she shone. She leapt out of the cassette."

== Release ==
=== Europe ===
The single was released in August 1991, 12 weeks after the label had signed her, giving Des'ree a record of shortest time between signing to a label and releasing a record. Initially, the record failed to have much success, peaking at a low No. 51 on the UK chart. In January 1992, while Des'ree was still recording her debut album, the song was re-released with a different mix and this time it became a hit, peaking at No. 13 on the UK chart. When released worldwide in 1992, it was a moderate hit around Europe, peaking within the top 40 in most countries, with a best showing in Sweden, where it became a top 10 hit peaking at No. 9.

=== US ===
In the US, "Feel So High" had been only released as a promo single and her debut album went unreleased there. Since American people were unfamiliar with the song, Sony decided to include the track as a bonus song on the US edition of Des'ree's second album I Ain't Movin'. With most music reviewers singling out the song, Des'ree's American label decided to issue "Feel So High" as the follow-up to her US top ten hit "You Gotta Be" in March 1995. The single failed to catch on as her previous single, and stalled at No. 67 on the Billboard Hot 100, becoming Des'ree's last appearance on the chart. Eventually, Mind Adventures was released in the US in 1995, but it excluded "Feel So High" from its track list as it had been included on her second album.

== Critical reception ==
The song received good reviews from music critics, and Des'ree drew comparisons with American singer Anita Baker for her deep voice and her music style. AllMusic editor Tom Demalon described it as a "slinky, mid-tempo" song and noted further that Des'ree "possesses a pleasing vocal delivery". Larry Flick from Billboard magazine said the newcomer "exudes a unique and refreshing style that is at first introspective and folkish, and then sophisticated and jazzy." Dave Sholin from the Gavin Report wrote, "Once again, Des'ree's soothing style compliments the music, giving the listener reason to feel good." Jim Arundel from Melody Maker remarked that her voice "has grace to spare, and a languidly divine tone." He concluded, "Seriously, this is a song so apart from mundanity, it qualifies as Fine Art."

A reviewer from Music & Media felt the singer-songwriter is a "real asset to the genre. Her soulful debut single could give her the same quick start as Tracy Chapman." Head of programmes Keith Pringle on Piccadilly Radio/Manchester said, "It's a classy record with a great hook. The sound fits the station, as we found out by testing the record with a phone panel. Just like Beverley Craven, it will take some re-releases before it will be a hit, but we're giving this single the lifetime of a hit." John Kilgo from The Network Forty remarked the "smooth polished vocals and a subtle hook that entices you to sing along after just one listen." Michael Odell from NME wrote, "The folky, sandal-wearing vibe of her vocal finds an oddly effective counterpoint in a shuffling dance beat. "Feel So High" has all the makings of one of those inexplicable 'Where'd that come from?' late summer hits." Mark Frith from Select viewed it as a "beautifully haunting gospel-like track".

== Music video ==
Three music videos were shot, the first two for the original release and the 1992 re-release, and a new one was filmed for the US release in 1995. The original video features Des'ree walking around a botanical garden with female friends with dancers on the background. There's also shot of Des'ree singing surrounded by candles and shots of Des'ree with a man in a bed and then singing with him embracing her. The video for the 1992 re-release shows Des'ree painting a portrait of a man. Eventually, she enters the portrait to meet the man. It was directed by Markus Blunder. The video for the 1995 US release shows Des'ree singing in a desert.

== Track listings ==
=== 1991 release ===
- 7-inch single – UK
1. "Feel So High" – 3:52
2. "Got To Be Strong" – 2:07
- CD maxi, 12-inch single (UK)
1. "Feel So High" – 3:52
2. "Got To Be Strong" – 2:07
3. "Stand On My Own Ground" (1st draft) – 4:43

=== 1992 release ===
- 7-inch single, cassette Single (UK)
1. "Feel So High" (New Born Again mix) – 3:52
2. "Save This Promised Land" (a capella) – 3:21
- CD single Europe
1. "Feel So High" (New Born Again mix) – 3:52
2. "Feel So High" (The Elevation mix) – 5:25
3. "Save This Promised Land" (a capella) – 3:21
4. "Got To Be Strong" – 2:07
- 12-inch maxi – UK
1. "Feel So High" (The Elevation mix) – 5:25
2. "Feel So High" (New Born Again mix) – 3:52
3. "Save This Promised Land" (a capella) – 3:21
4. "Got To Be Strong" – 2:07

=== 1995 release ===
- CD single – US
1. "Feel So High" – 3:53
2. "Mind Adventures" – 4:45
3. "Innocent & Naive" – 3:40
4. "You Gotta Be" (Love Will Save The Day mix) – 4:04
- CD single – Japan
1. "Feel So High" (The Family Stand remix) – 3:53
2. "You Gotta Be" (Hourglass mix) – 3:51
3. "Little Child" – 3:53
4. "I Ain't Movin'" – 3:33
5. "You Gotta Be" (Love Will Save The Day mix) – 4:04
6. "Take A Chance" – 5:13

== Charts ==
=== Weekly charts ===
Chart (1991)	Peak position
UK Singles (Official Charts)	51
UK Airplay (Music Week)	58

Chart (1992)	Peak position
Australia (ARIA)	28
Belgium (Ultratop 50 Flanders)	38
Europe (European Dance Radio)	12
France (SNEP)	46
Germany (GfK)	15
Ireland (IRMA)	20
Netherlands (Dutch Top 40)	23
Netherlands (Single Top 100)	25
New Zealand (Recorded Music NZ)	41
Sweden (Sverigetopplistan)	9
Switzerland (Schweizer Hitparade)	11
UK Singles (Official Charts) "Feel So High 1992"	13
UK Airplay (Music Week)	2
UK Dance (Music Week)	14
UK Club Chart (Music Week)	76

Chart (1995)	Peak position
US Billboard Hot 100	67
US Pop Airplay (Billboard)	39
US Cash Box Top 100	38

=== Year-end charts ===
Chart (1992)	Position
Germany (Media Control)	99
Sweden (Topplistan)	78

== Samples ==
In 1997, "Feel So High" was interpolated into the Janet Jackson song "Got 'til It's Gone" from Jackson's CD The Velvet Rope without due credit to Des'ree as a contributor. The maxi single, released in 2000, lists Des'ree and Michael Graves as two of the song's writers.
