= Concert for Linda =

1999 benefit concert by Paul McCartney

The Concert for Linda was a benefit tribute to Linda McCartney, wife of Paul McCartney. It was held at the Royal Albert Hall in London on 10 April 1999. Linda McCartney died after a long battle with cancer nearly a year earlier, when she was 56. They were married for 29 years.

The event was organised by two of their friends, Chrissie Hynde and Carla Lane. Comedian Eddie Izzard hosted the concert, with proceeds going to various animal rights charities. Chrissie Hynde and Linda had worked together supporting various animal rights groups, including PETA. Tickets to the show, with 5,000 people attending, sold out within an hour after going on sale.

== Background ==
According to Chrissie Hynde, she, Linda McCartney and their friends had discussed holding a concert before Linda's death. Thereafter, Carla Lane suggested turning the show into a tribute to her. The concert's vegetarian theme reflected the McCartney's longstanding commitment to animal rights and environmentalism. Both Linda and Paul became vegetarian in the early 1970s, and Martinelli described Linda as "equally, if not more, committed" than Paul. The concert reflected Linda's association with the animal rights movement, and proceeds from the event supported some of Linda's favourite animal charities, including an animal sanctuary run by Lane near Haywards Heath.

== Performances ==
Besides Paul McCartney's unannounced performance, the show featured more than a dozen artists singing their own songs and their own versions of Beatles' material. Among the other groups performing were George Michael, the Pretenders, Elvis Costello, Tom Jones, Sinéad O'Connor, Des'ree, Heather Small, guitarist Johnny Marr, Neil Finn, Marianne Faithfull and Ladysmith Black Mambazo. Faithfull, who wanted to appear, said "I didn't know Linda well, but she made my friend very happy, and that's the main thing."

McCartney was not expected to perform, as he had not done any shows since his wife died. However, he attended the event with his four children. After he took to the stage to thank the audience, at the urging of Chrissie Hynde, he sang one of his and Linda's favorite 1950s songs, Ricky Nelson's "Lonesome Town". He was backed by members of the Pretenders, along with Costello. The song was Paul's first recorded song since Linda died.

He followed that with his 1963 hit, "All My Loving", originally performed by the Beatles. Most of the night's performers joined him on stage to provide the chorus. Costello said that for this particular event, "there was something incredibly poignant" about the song's opening lyrics: Close your eyes and I'll kiss you, Tomorrow I'll miss you, Remember I'll always be true.

After those songs, Hynde rushed over and gave McCartney an emotional embrace. Everyone then joined in for the closing song, "Let It Be".

== Production and broadcast ==
Linda McCartney's photographs were used as the backdrop to the performances. The event was directed and filmed by Kevin Godley and produced by Helen Terry. It was broadcast on BBC Radio 2 on 17 April 1999 and televised on BBC One on 18 April 1999.
