= Child (band) =

British band

- Origin: United Kingdom
- Genres: Pop, MOR
- Instruments: Vocals, guitars, drums
- Years active: 1976–1980, 2021–present
- Labels: Ariola Hansa, BUK Records, Pentagon, Cherry Red Records, Red Cat Records, Honeybee Records
- Members: Graham Bilbrough; Andy Dures; Richie Hunter; Tony Endecotte; Dave Walker
- Past members: Dave Cooper; Keith Atack; Tim Atack; Mike Mckenzie Steve O Brien

Child are a British pop group that released a number of records, including a top-10 single in 1978. The band were originally a four-piece, consisting of Dave Cooper (guitar), Graham Bilbrough (vocals) and twins Keith (bass guitar) and Tim Atack (drums). Following the release of the first four singles Dave Cooper left to form rock band Crash Alley and Mike Mckenzie joined on bass guitar with Keith Atack switching to guitar. Their biggest hit was a cover of the Conway Twitty song "It's Only Make Believe", which was a top ten hit in 1978. Child was reformed by Graham Bilbrough in 2021, with new members of the band Andrew Dures, Richie Hunter, Tony Endecott, and Dave Walker.

== History ==
Child were formed in the early 1970s consisting of Graham Bilbrough (born 1958), Dave Cooper (born 1957) and twin brothers Keith and Tim Atack (born 1959). The members were in their early teens at the time, performing under the name Reincarnation.They were spotted by Mike Devere, Mike offered to manage the band, he set about creating the bands image and got them their first record contract. Mike managed the band until the early eighties.Their first single was released in 1976 but failed to chart.

After touring and many television appearances, the group secured a record deal with Ariola Hansa. With this label the group achieved their first chart hit after appearing on Top of the Pops. The song was a cover of The Searchers' hit "When You Walk in the Room", and reached number 38 in the UK. Following this up with another cover, the formula worked even better and the group had a top 10 hit with "It's Only Make Believe", which earned them a silver disc from the BPI for sales in excess of 250,000. In 1979, they scored their third chart hit with (another cover) "Only You (And You Alone)", which reached number 33. Their first album for Ariola Hansa (entitled The First Album) again earned them a BPI silver disc. Their second album, Total Recall, was less successful and the group disbanded soon afterwards in 1980. Despite being a pop band in the punk age, Child were voted the second most popular UK band amongst teenage girls in a 1978 poll conducted by the magazine Fab 208.

Keith and Tim Atack went on to become session musicians, backing the likes of David Cassidy, Rick Astley and Bonnie Tyler in the 1980s. They also formed a singing duo under two different names, Atack (early 1980s) and The Duel (late 1980s), but neither found success. Keith went on to form the Eagles tribute band the Illegal Eagles in the 1990s and still plays with them. Tim became musical director to Des'ree before becoming a film and television score composer, writing for films such as The Invention of Lying and Cemetery Junction as well as the love theme from Romeo + Juliet, which went on to be covered by Beyoncé.

== Discography ==
=== Albums ===
Date	Album	UK	Certifications	Label
1977	Child	—		Honeybee
1978	The First Album	—	BPI: Silver	Ariola Hansa
1979	Total Recall	—		Ariola Hansa
"—" denotes releases that did not chart.

=== Singles ===
Date	Single	UK	AUS	Certifications	Label
1976	"River of Love"	—	—		Buk
1976	"Maybe Baby Someday"	—	—		Buk
1977	"What's a Nice Girl Like You"	—	—		Pentagon
1978	"When You Walk in the Room"	38	—		Ariola Hansa
1978	"It's Only Make Believe"	10	87	BPI: Silver	Ariola Hansa
1978	"Still the One"	—	—		Ariola Hansa
1979	"Only You (And You Alone)"	33	—		Ariola Hansa
1979	"Here Comes Summer"	—	—		Ariola Hansa
1979	"The Shape I'm in"	—	—		Ariola Hansa
"—" denotes releases that did not chart or were not released.

Lonely Xmas, No 32, Heritage Chart 2022, Love You Forever, No 7 Heritage Chart 2023. I Love How You Love Me, No 1 Heritage Chart 2024. I'm On The Outside (Looking In), No 1 Heritage Chart 2024.( 2 weeks ) Forget Him No 4 Heritage Chart 2025. Penny Arcade at Xmas, No 7 Heritage Chart 2025. You Are My Destiny, No 17, Heritage Chart 2026.
