= What's Your Sign? (song) =

1998 single by Des'ree

Single by Des'ree

from the album Supernatural
- B-side: "You Gotta Be"
- Released: 30 September 1998
- Length: 4:08 (album version); 3:56 (radio edit)
- Label: Sony Soho Square; Dusted Sound
- Songwriters: Des'ree; Ashley Ingram
- Producers: Des'ree; Ashley Ingram

Des'ree singles chronology
"Life" (1998)	"What's Your Sign?" (1998)	"You Gotta Be" (remix) (1999)

Music video
- "What's Your Sign" on YouTube

"What's Your Sign" is a song by British pop and soul singer Des'ree. Co-written and co-produced by the singer and Ashley Ingram, "What's Your Sign?" was released as the fourth single from Des'ree's third studio album, Supernatural (1998), on 30 September 1998 in Japan and on 26 October in the United Kingdom. The song reached number one in Spain and entered the top 40 in Austria, France and the UK.

== Background ==
The song is about people's obsession with astrology and how compatible people are in love based on their astrological sign. It was released as the follow-up to Des'ree's European hit "Life".

== Track listings ==
UK CD1

1. "What's Your Sign?" (radio edit) – 3:56
2. "What's Your Sign?" (Saturn Return mix) – 7:56
3. "You Gotta Be" – 4:06

UK CD2

1. "What's Your Sign?" (radio edit) – 3:56
2. "What's Your Sign?" (Refugee Camp remix) – 4:13
3. "What's Your Sign?" (Refugee Camp instrumental) – 4:10

Uk cassette single and European CD single

1. "What's Your Sign?" (radio edit) – 3:56
2. "You Gotta Be" – 4:06

Australian CD single

1. "What's Your Sign?" (radio edit) – 3:56
2. "What's Your Sign?" (Saturn Return mix) – 7:56
3. "What's Your Sign?" (Refugee Camp remix) – 4:13
4. "What's Your Sign?" (Refugee Camp instrumental) – 4:10
5. "You Gotta Be" – 3:59

Japanese CD single

1. "What's Your Sign?" (radio edit)
2. "What's Your Sign?" (Saturn Return mix)
3. "What's Your Sign?" (Aquarius mix)
4. "You Gotta Be" (live)

== Charts ==
Chart (1998–1999)	Peak position
Australia (ARIA)	167
Austria (Ö3 Austria Top 40)	31
Belgium (Ultratip Bubbling Under Flanders)	5
Europe (Eurochart Hot 100)	57
France (SNEP)	37
Germany (GfK)	65
Netherlands (Dutch Top 40 Tipparade)	13
Netherlands (Single Top 100)	70
New Zealand (Recorded Music NZ)	41
Scotland Singles (OCC)	20
Spain (AFYVE)	1
Switzerland (Schweizer Hitparade)	43
UK Singles (OCC)	19
UK Hip Hop/R&B (OCC)	6

== Release history ==
Region	Date	Format(s)	Label(s)	Ref.
Japan	30 September 1998	CD	Epic	
United Kingdom	26 October 1998	CD; cassette	Sony Soho Square; Dusted Sound	
