= Mind Adventures =

Studio album by Des'ree
- Released: 17 February 1992
- Recorded: 1991–1992
- Genres: R&B; soul; pop
- Length: 47:33
- Labels: Epic; 550; Sony Soho Square
- Producers: Ashley Ingram; Femi; Phil Legg

Des'ree chronology
| Mind Adventures (1992) | I Ain't Movin' (1994) |

Alternate cover
- American edition cover

Singles from Mind Adventures
- 1. "Feel So High" Released: 1991; 2. "Mind Adventures" Released: 1992; 3. "Why Should I Love You" Released: 1992

Professional ratings
Review scores
| Source | Rating |
|---|---|
| Robert Christgau | (dud) |
| The Encyclopedia of Popular Music | 2/5 stars |

Mind Adventures is the debut album by British soul singer-songwriter Des'ree. It was released on 17 February 1992 on the Sony Soho Square record label, and features the UK top 20 hit, "Feel So High". The album became Des'ree's first top 40 album, peaking at number 26 on the UK Albums Chart.

The album was not released in the United States at the time. It got a belated release on 4 April 1995, after Des'ree's second album I Ain't Movin' had been released there the previous year and she was achieving success with the single "You Gotta Be". Since "Feel So High" had been included on the US edition of I Ain't Movin', the US edition of Mind Adventures excluded it from its track list.

== Singles ==
Three singles were released from Mind Adventures, "Feel So High" (in both 1991 and 1992), "Mind Adventures" and "Why Should I Love You".

== Track listing ==
Worldwide edition (US edition excludes "Feel So High")

| No. | Title | Writer(s) | Length |
|---|---|---|---|
| 1. | "Average Man" | Desirée Weekes; Michael Graves | 5:06 |
| 2. | "Feel So High" | Weekes; Graves | 3:53 |
| 3. | "Sun of '79" | Weekes | 5:14 |
| 4. | "Why Should I Love You" | Weekes | 4:14 |
| 5. | "Stand on My Own Ground" | Weekes; Graves | 4:07 |
| 6. | "Competitive World" | Weekes; Graves | 5:31 |
| 7. | "Mind Adventures" | Weekes | 4:44 |
| 8. | "Laughter" | Weekes | 4:47 |
| 9. | "Save Me" | Weekes | 5:29 |
| 10. | "Momma Please Don't Cry" | Weekes | 4:28 |

== Credits ==
=== Personnel ===
- Des'ree – vocals, backing vocals
- Ashley Ingram – keyboards, guitars, bass, drums, string arrangements, arrangements (4), track and choir arrangements (9)
- Pete Hinds – keyboards
- Pete Wingfield – keyboards
- Mick Talbot – keyboards (3)
- Andy Williams – programming (3)
- Young Disciples – all other instruments (3)
- Ian Alleyne – guitars
- Phil Legg – guitars, bass, drums, arrangements (7)
- Greg Lester – guitars
- Glenn Nightingale – guitars
- Malcolm Joseph – bass
- Fionn O'Lochlainn – bass
- Trevor Murrell – drums
- Ritchie Stevens – drums
- Harry Morgan – percussion
- Jeff Scantlebury – percussion
- Gary Barnacle – saxophones
- Nick Ingman – string arrangements
- Michael Graves – arrangements (1, 2, 5, 6)
- The Ashley Ingram Choir – backing vocals (9)

=== Production ===
- Des'ree – executive producer
- Ashley Ingram – producer (1, 2, 5), additional production (4, 9)
- Phil Legg – additional production (1, 2), mixing (1, 2), producer (4, 6–10)
- Femi Fem – producer (3)
- Brendan Lynch – engineer (3)
- Me Company – design
- Monica Curtin – photography
- Casper King Management – management

== Charts ==
| Chart (1992) | Peak position |
|---|---|
| Australian Albums (ARIA) | 39 |
| UK Albums (Official Charts) | 26 |

== Certifications and sales ==
| Region | Certification | Certified units/sales |
|---|---|---|
| Canada (Music Canada) | Gold | 50,000^{^} |
| United Kingdom (BPI) | Silver | 60,000^{^} |
| United States | — | 28,000 |
Summaries
| Worldwide | — | 400,000 |
^{^} Shipments figures based on certification alone.
