= A Love Story (Des'ree album) =

Studio album by Des'ree
- Released: 11 October 2019
- Recorded: 2012–2018
- Studio: AIR Studios, Lyndhurst, Hampstead, England, United Kingdom
- Genre: Contemporary R&B, funk
- Length: 40:58
- Language: English
- Label: Stargazer

Des'ree chronology
Dream Soldier (2003)	A Love Story (2019)

A Love Story is the fifth album by British contemporary R&B singer Des'ree, her first in 16 years. She began recording the album in 2012, but finalizing the album was delayed due to her caring for her sick mother, as well as tensions with her record label, stage fright, and personal health problems. She preceded the album release with the single "Don't Be Afraid". "Holding on for Dear Life" appeared in an earlier form as a Japanese bonus track on her previous album, Dream Soldier (2003).

== Critical reception ==
In musicOMH, Nick Smith scored A Love Story four out of five stars, noting the "subtle beauty and emotional power" of the singer's voice that also has a "beautiful power and precious nuance", leading to the album being "a solid and engaging return".

== Track listing ==
1. "A Call to Love" (Des'ree and Michael Graves) – 4:11
2. "Don't Be Afraid" (Tim Atack and Des'ree) – 4:49
3. "Drunk on Your Kisses" (Des'ree and Graves) – 4:30
4. "Honey" (Des'ree and David Munday) – 4:23
5. "Love Me" (Des'ree and Howard Francis) – 4:15
6. "Nothing I Can Do" (Des'ree and Graves) – 5:10
7. "Holding on for Dear Life" (Atack and Des'ree) – 3:59
8. "What'll I Do" (Des'ree and Graves) – 4:41
9. "Fake It" (Des'ree and Graves) – 5:00

== Personnel ==
- Des'ree – vocals
- Robin Baynton – engineering and mixing
- Andy Bradfield – mixing
- Chris Cameron – arrangement, orchestration, and conducting
- Geoff Foster – recording
- The London Session Orchestra:
- Mark Berrow
- Rachel Bolt
- Ian Burdge
- Emil Chakalov
- Caroline Dale
- Ian Humphries
- Helen Kamminga
- Patrick Kiernan
- Joely Koos
- Boguslaw Kostecki
- Peter Lale
- Oli Langford
- Gaby Lester
- Anthony Lewis
- Rita Manning
- Steve Morris
- Everton Nelson
- Andy Parker
- Tom Pigott-Smith
- Kate Robinson
- Frank Schaefer
- Mary Scully
- Emlyn Singleton
- Sonia Slany
- Nicky Sweeney
- Cathy Thompson
- Allen Walley
- Vicci Wardman
- Bruce White
- Debbie Widdup
- Jonathan Williams
- Warren Zeilinski
- Dean Northcott – photography

== See also ==
- List of 2019 albums
