= You Gotta Be =

1994 single by Des'ree

- Original CD single cover

Single by Des'ree

from the album I Ain't Movin'
- B-side: "Sun of 79"; "Warm Hands, Cold Heart"
- Released: 28 March 1994
- Genre: Pop-R&B; soul
- Length: 4:04
- Label: Sony Soho Square
- Songwriters: Des'ree; Ashley Ingram
- Producer: Ashley Ingram

Des'ree singles chronology
"Delicate" (1993)	"You Gotta Be" (1994)	"I Ain't Movin'" (1994)
"Little Child" (1994)	"You Gotta Be" (1995)	"Kissing You" (1998)
"What's Your Sign?" (1998)	"You Gotta Be" (1999)	"Ain't No Sunshine" (1999)

Music video
- "You Gotta Be" on YouTube "You Gotta Be ('99 Mix)" on YouTube

"You Gotta Be" is an R&B/soul song by British singer and songwriter Des'ree, written by her with Ashley Ingram, who produced the song. It is the third track on the singer's second album, I Ain't Movin' (1994), and the opening track on the US release of that album. The song was released as a single in March 1994 by Sony Soho Square, becoming a top-40 hit in several countries, and a top-10 hit in the United States, Brazil and Australia. The accompanying music video was directed by Paul Boyd, depicting Des'ree performing in black-and-white. By 13 June 1998, the single had sold 358,000 copies in United States, and it has received sales certifications in New Zealand and the United Kingdom.

The song was used in several television advertisements over the following years, and a 1999 remix used in a Ford Focus advert became a top-10 hit in Des'ree's native UK and a number-one hit in Spain. Q Magazine included "You Gotta Be" on their list of the "1001 Best Songs Ever" in 2003.

== Background ==
Described by Stuart Elliott in The New York Times as "an infectiously sunny tune about the affirmative powers of self-confidence," "You Gotta Be" according to Des'ree is, like all the songs on its parent album, "about having the inner strength to figure out who you are" with "You Gotta Be" specifically being "born out of me stopping myself and thinking every day how you gotta be something. You have to be cool and calm in [one] situation, and then you have to be bold and strong in another situation."

Des'ree drew inspiration for "You Gotta Be" from the Shakti Gawain book Creative Visualization which had abetted the singer's recovery from a painful romantic break-up; "I've always been blindly optimistic, and that [book] helped me rise from my melancholia," explains Des'ree who it is said "swears by daily affirmations."

== Release ==
"You Gotta Be" was released several times in the United Kingdom: first on 28 March 1994, then on 27 February 1995 after it had become a US top-10 hit, and again on 22 March 1999 in a remixed version because of its use in the 1999 Ford Focus advertising campaign and following the success of Des'ree's previous singles "Life" and "What's Your Sign?". The latter release of "You Gotta Be" charted in its highest position out of all three releases in the United Kingdom, peaking at No. 10. This version, entitled the "1999 Mix" was added to a re-issue of her third studio album Supernatural. The original release first charted in September 1994 in the United States and slowly climbed the charts peaking at No. 5 in March 1995, and staying 44 weeks on the Billboard Hot 100. The remixed version of the song was a number-one hit in Spain for two weeks in February and March 1999.

== Critical reception ==
AllMusic editor Tom Demalon described "You Gotta Be" as "uplifting", noting that it "best exemplified Des'ree's smooth blend of Pop-R&B music and power-of-positive thinking lyrical style." Larry Flick from Billboard magazine wrote that the "adventurous artist" is pulling out an "percussive mover." He explained further, "Des'ree has a deep alto range and a compelling style that renders anything she sings a sophisticated musical gift. At a time when jockin' a new-jill-swing position is the name of the R&B radio game, single has an iffy future. Justice prevailing, though, programmers with minds of their own (and a modicum of good taste) will give this one a fair shot. Otherwise, punters should take this information and go find the album on their own. It's well worth the effort." Michele Romero from Entertainment Weekly declared the song as "deliciously hypnotic", adding that it "sounds like a mini-motivational seminar".

Dave Sholin from the Gavin Report stated, "On her own this time around, she delivers a mid-tempo gem about being one's own person. The lyrics are positive and hopeful—perfect for summertime." Mike Wass from Idolator wrote, "A relentlessly upbeat self-help anthem with a mantra-like chorus, the track was a much-needed ray of light at the height of grunge, and can still be heard in lifts and doctor’s waiting rooms today." In his weekly UK chart commentary, James Masterton said, "The more I listen to this the more I am convinced it is a simple rewrite of her first hit 'Feel So High'." Pan-European magazine Music & Media commented, "In her only two-year absence a whole new generation of soul dames have taken over her position of most promising newcomer. Gabrielle's 'Dreams' must have been model for this reply."

Alan Jones from Music Week wrote, "Folksily soulful in its original version, a remix adds a slow, muscular bass and other elements that leave it sounding like a suave second cousin to the Isley Brothers' 'Between the Sheets'." John Kilgo from The Network Forty named it a "superb" track. Dele Fadele from NME viewed it as a "vaguely pleasant rehash" of 'Feel So High', "complete with words of advice and a well-streamlined and tasteful dance backing." Bob Waliszewski of Plugged In found that it is "heeding parental wisdom". In his weekly dance column in Record Mirror, James Hamilton named it a "nasally crooned slightly dull gentle jogger". Troy J. Augusto from Variety remarked its "fresh, infectious groove".

== Music video ==
The music video for "You Gotta Be" was directed by Scottish music video, commercial and feature film director Paul Boyd of Propaganda Films. He also co-directed photography with Roberto Schaefer, while Michael Kahn produced the video, which was filmed with a 45-person crew and lasted two days. In the video, which was released on 5 April 1994, Des'ree performs in front of a either completely white or black background that changes, following the rhythm of the song. It also features four simultaneous images of the singer, which are composited into one frame to represent the different aspects of the artist's personality.

The shoot was filmed in colour, but this was removed during a weeklong post-production process. Boyd told Billboard magazine in September 1994, "It was an interesting technical challenge. Des'ree was given coordinates, and we'd plot it all out. We'd give her a different mood for each position, and ultimately we encapsulated the whole vibe of Des'ree." "You Gotta Be" received heavy rotation on VH-1 and was put on medium rotation on the BET shows "Midnight Love" and "Heart And Soul of R&B". On MTV, it was put on active rotation and The Box also played the video. "You Gotta Be" was nominated in the category for Best Female Video at the 1995 MTV Video Music Awards, but lost to Madonna's "Take a Bow". It was also nominated for Best Clip in the category for Pop/Rock and for Maximum Vision Clip at the 1995 Billboard Music Video Awards.

== Track listings ==
=== 1994 release ===
- CD maxi – UK
1. "You Gotta Be" – 4:04
2. "Sun of 79" – 5:14
3. "You Gotta Be" (Frankie Foncett mix) – 5:18
4. "You Gotta Be" (After Hours mix) – 4:30
- CD maxi – UK
1. "You Gotta Be"
2. "You Gotta Be" (Blacksmith 7-inch radio edit)
3. "You Gotta Be" (Blacksmith 12-inch mix)
4. "Warm Hands, Cold Heart"
- 12-inch maxi – UK
1. "You Gotta Be" (Frankie Foncett mix)
2. "You Gotta Be" (The Max)
3. "You Gotta Be" (After Hours mix)
4. "You Gotta Be" (Hourglass mix)
5. "You Gotta Be" (Love Will Save the Day mix)

=== 1995 release ===
- CD single 1 – Europe
1. "You Gotta Be" – 4:01
2. "Warm Hands, Cold Heart" – 4:35
- CD single 2 – Europe
1. "You Gotta Be" – 4:01
2. "Warm Hands, Cold Heart" – 4:35
3. "Sun of 79" – 5:15
- CD maxi – Europe
1. "You Gotta Be" – 4:03
2. "You Gotta Be" (Blacksmith mix) – 5:29
3. "You Gotta Be" (Frankie Foncett mix) – 5:18
4. "You Gotta Be" (Love Will Save the Day mix) – 4:03
- 12-inch maxi – UK
1. "You Gotta Be" (Blacksmith mix)
2. "You Gotta Be" (Frankie Foncett mix)
3. "You Gotta Be" (Love Will Save the Day mix)

=== 1999 mix ===
- CD single 1 – UK
1. "You Gotta Be" (1999 mix) – 3:57
2. "You Gotta Be" (Tin Tin Out remix)
3. "Soul Paradise"
- CD single 2 – UK
1. "You Gotta Be" (1999 mix) – 3:57
2. "Life" – 3:36
3. "You Gotta Be" – 4:06
- Cassette – UK
1. "You Gotta Be" (1999 mix) – 3:57
2. "You Gotta Be" – 4:06

== Charts ==
=== Weekly charts ===
==== Original version ====
Chart (1994–1995)	Peak position
Australia (ARIA)	9
Brazil (UPI)	4
Canada Top Singles (RPM)	36
Canada Adult Contemporary (RPM)	1
Europe (Eurochart Hot 100)	31
Europe (European AC Radio)	22
Europe (European Dance Radio)	1
Europe (European Hit Radio)	12
France (SNEP)	20
Germany (GfK)	79
Israel (Israeli Singles Chart)	3
Italy (Musica e dischi)	14
Netherlands (Single Top 100)	47
New Zealand (Recorded Music NZ)	11
Scottish Singles Sales (Official Charts)	14
UK Singles (Official Charts)	14
UK Dance (Official Charts)	30
UK Hip Hop/R&B (Official Charts)	2
UK Airplay (Music Week)	14
UK Dance (Music Week)	22
UK Club Chart (Music Week)	44
US Billboard Hot 100	5
US Adult Contemporary (Billboard)	2
US Adult Pop Airplay (Billboard)	23
US Hot R&B/Hip-Hop Songs (Billboard)	72
US Pop Airplay (Billboard)	6
US Rhythmic Airplay (Billboard)	24
US Cash Box Top 100	5

==== 1999 mix ====
Chart (1999)	Peak position
Belgium (Ultratip Bubbling Under Flanders)	4
Europe (Eurochart Hot 100)	32
Germany (GfK)	76
Iceland (Íslenski Listinn Topp 40)	9
Netherlands (Dutch Top 40 Tipparade)	20
Netherlands (Single Top 100)	77
Scottish Singles Sales (Official Charts)	12
Spain (AFYVE)	1
UK Singles (Official Charts)	10
UK Hip Hop/R&B (Official Charts)	2

=== Year-end charts ===
Chart (1994)	Position
Australia (ARIA)	69
New Zealand (RIANZ)	31
UK Singles (OCC)	148

Chart (1995)	Position
Brazil (Crowley)	15
Canada Adult Contemporary (RPM)	38
France (SNEP)	87
UK Airplay (Music Week)	33
US Billboard Hot 100	20
US Adult Contemporary (Billboard)	3
US Top 40/Mainstream (Billboard)	19
US Cash Box Top 100	26

Chart (1999)	Position
Spain (AFYVE)	12
UK Singles (OCC)	157

== Certifications and sales ==
Region	Certification	Certified units/sales
New Zealand (RMNZ)	Platinum	30,000^{‡}
United Kingdom (BPI)	Platinum	600,000^{‡}
United States	—	358,000
^{‡} Sales+streaming figures based on certification alone.

== Media appearances ==
In April 1994, it was used by Sky Movies, for their summer preview commercial. In March 1995, ABC began airing an ad campaign for Good Morning America, aimed at attracting a younger demographic and also boosting male viewership, in which Des'ree's "You Gotta Be" played under scenes of "Americans immersed in morning rituals: commuters rushing, a young man shaving, school-bound children" intercut with shots of the Good Morning America hosts.

Also in 1995, the song and music video were parodied by Ellen Cleghorne (playing O. J. Simpson's first wife Marguerite Whitley but visually resembling Des'ree) during a Season 20 episode of Saturday Night Live. While Luscious Jackson were the musical guests that episode, Des'ree herself performed both the song and "Feel So High" as the musical guest two episodes later. The song was also used for Ford's Focus commercial between 1998 and 1999.

This song was featured in the films The Next Karate Kid and The Object of My Affection. It was also used in a special promo for PBS Kids shown every Martin Luther King Jr. Day between 2001 and 2006. A cover of the song was also featured in an episode of Don't Trust the B— in Apartment 23.

After being dropped from Sony in 2004, Des'ree did not allow the use of the song in films, television shows (including Glee and Happy Endings) or commercials. However, upon her return to the music industry in 2019, the song was re-licensed, with the song being used in the film Captain Marvel.

A reworked version of this song was used in the Big Sing 2008. The Big Sing raised money for CLIC Sargent and Marie Curie with hundreds of schools singing this song at the same time across the United Kingdom and Republic of Ireland, breaking the record for "most people simultaneously singing the same song".

In 2021, the song was featured in CW's The Flash, covered by Mel B in an episode of Antena 3's Spanish adaptation of The Masked Singer, and featured in a mashup with Janet Jackson's Rhythm Nation in the 2021 adaptation of Cinderella, sung by Camila Cabello, Idina Menzel and the ensemble cast.

In 2022, the song was again covered in The Lake, S1E5. It was sung by Billie, played by Madison Shamoun.
