= Kissing You (Des'ree song) =

1997 song by Des'ree

Single by Des'ree

from the album William Shakespeare's Romeo + Juliet: Music from the Motion Picture
- B-side: "You Gotta Be"
- Released: 24 February 1997
- Genre: Pop
- Length: 4:57
- Label: Sony Music
- Songwriters: Des'ree; Timothy Atack
- Producer: Nellee Hooper

Des'ree singles chronology
"You Gotta Be" (1995)	"Kissing You" (1997)	"Life" (1998)

Music video
- "I'm Kissing You" on YouTube

"Kissing You" (or "I'm Kissing You") is a song by British singer Des'ree. It was written by the singer with Timothy Atack for Baz Luhrmann's 1996 film Romeo + Juliet. The song was included on the film's soundtrack album and Des'ree's third studio album, Supernatural (1998). A pop ballad set in the key of A minor, the record uses a simple instrumentation consisting only of piano and string instruments. "Kissing You" featured in Romeo + Juliet when the title characters meet at a ball. The song was well received by critics for its emotional melody and toned-down production.

First released as a single in Australia on 24 February 1997, it appeared on the ARIA Singles Chart and the UK Singles Chart. A music video accompanied the single, which included scenes from Romeo + Juliet. This song is also used in Season 2, Episode 2 of ‘’The Summer I Turned Pretty’’. "Kissing You" was covered by Beyoncé in 2007, and an accompanying music video was filmed, titled "Still in Love (Kissing You)". The change of title and music video went against copyright terms, and Des'ree's publishers filed a lawsuit against Beyoncé and her representatives. Infringing albums were recalled, and both sides agreed that the case be settled out of court.

== Background and composition ==
"Kissing You"
A sample of the song, demonstrating its simple piano and string instrumentation

"Kissing You" was written by Des'ree and Timothy Atack, and was produced by Nellee Hooper. The string instruments were arranged by Craig Armstrong, while Andy Todd and Jim Abbiss engineered the record. The pop ballad uses only piano and string instrumentation. According to the sheet music published at Musicnotes.com by T C F Music Publishing, Inc., "Kissing You" is set in 12/8 time with a moderately slow tempo of 112 beats per minute. Written in the key of A minor, it has a sequence of Dm^{7}–Am^{7}–G/B–C–G/B–Am^{7}–C/G as its chord progression. Des'ree's voice spans from the low note of A_{3} to the high note of D_{5}.

"Kissing You" is featured during Romeo + Juliet, directed by Baz Luhrmann, when Romeo (Leonardo DiCaprio) and Juliet (Claire Danes) first meet at a ball at the Capulets' mansion; Des'ree also appears in the scene performing the song. The song was featured on the film's soundtrack album, and was included on Des'ree's third studio album, Supernatural (1998). Sony Music released the single via compact disc on 18 June 1997. "Kissing You" was also sold as the B-side to "Life" (1998) in the UK. The musical interlude in the middle of "Kissing You" was used to promote the UEFA Euro 2004.

== Reception ==
New Statesman's Lisa Jardine noted "Kissing You" as "a high point" of the film. J. D. Considine wrote for The Baltimore Sun that "the tremulous intensity of Des'ree's 'Kissing You' has more emotional impact than many films". In a review of Supernatural for Entertainment Weekly, Considine later commended the "throaty emotionalism" with which Des'ree sang "Kissing You". Jim Farber from the Daily News noted the song as the standout track from Supernatural and claimed that it "stands as the only track to deepen the mood, bringing out the indigo pleasures of her voice." The Richmond Times-Dispatch's Kate Lipper called the record "an excellent slow song that you can play nonstop". However, Ann Powers from The New York Times wrote that Des'ree is too melodramatic on "Kissing You". In an interview with The Sunday Telegraph, Charlotte Church described the song as one of her favourites: "This is one of the most beautiful songs I've ever heard. It's an original sound and they sing it so well. There's no beat, it's just a lovely, lulling song."

"Kissing You" debuted on the Australian ARIA Singles Chart at number 42 on the week ending 9 March 1997. It rose to its peak position of number 17 on 20 April 1997, and spent a total of 13 weeks on the chart. In December 2010, "Kissing You" entered the UK Singles Chart at number 137. In 2013 Abbey Clancy waltzed to "Kissing You" on the 11th series of Strictly Come Dancing, and the song reentered the UK Singles Chart at number 91. In 2016, "Kissing You" appeared on the French Singles Chart at number 90.

== Music video ==
The music video for "Kissing You" features scenes of Romeo + Juliet, mainly those when Romeo and Juliet first meet at the Capulets' ball. Interspersed are clips of Des'ree singing the song in an empty building, with water on the floor. Towards the end of the video, some of the final scenes of the film are displayed, and the building that Des'ree is in is illuminated through the windows. The video was included on the film's special edition DVD, released in 2002.

== Beyoncé cover and lawsuit ==
"Still in Love (Kissing You)"

Song by Beyoncé

from the album B'Day (Deluxe edition)
- Released: April 3, 2007
- Length: 4:41
- Label: Columbia; Music World; Sony Urban
- Songwriters: Des'ree; Timothy Atack

"Kissing You" was covered by American R&B singer Beyoncé, included on the 2007 deluxe edition of her second studio album, B'Day. Beyoncé contributed to the writing and production. She called the song "a beautiful ballad". Sal Cinquemani of Slant Magazine wrote that the song "sound[s] downright subtle".

Des'ree's publishers, the Royalty Network, filed a lawsuit against Sony BMG, Sony BMG Sales Enterprise, Beyoncé, B-Day Publishing and EMI April Music, claiming that Beyoncé's cover of the song infringed copyright conditions. On 13 February 2007, Beyoncé's representatives had sought permission to use interpolations of "Kissing You". The Royalty Network offered Beyoncé the use of the song under certain terms. Two of the conditions of the proposal were that the song's title remain the same, and that the song was not published in video form. Beyoncé made no further contact with the Royalty Network, and planned to release "Still in Love (Kissing You)" and its video, regardless of the two requested conditions, which the Royalty Network called "completely unacceptable". A music video for the song was shot and directed by Cliff Watts, who had also shot Beyoncé's Sports Illustrated cover. Filmed on Super 8 in Miami, the video was included on the B'Day Anthology Video Album. The publishing company requested that Sony Music Entertainment (SME)—the parent company of Columbia Records—halt distribution of B'Day with the retitled song. Nevertheless, the album was released on 3 April 2007; the Royalty Network considered the action "willful disregard", and retracted their permission to use the song.

The lawsuit, filed on 16 April 2007 in the District Court for the Southern District of New York, sought US$150,000 in damages and a recall of the infringing material. The same day, SME ceased distribution of both the deluxe edition of B'Day and the anthology video album, although the editions had sold over 214,000 copies before the recall. Later reissues of the albums did not include "Still in Love (Kissing You)" and its video, with "If" replacing the track on the B'Day deluxe edition. An injunction hearing was scheduled for 4 May, and later postponed until 14 May 2007. On 12 October 2007, the case was dismissed with prejudice, by agreement of all parties. Beyoncé's father and manager, Mathew Knowles, stated that his daughter did not know about the copyright issues prior to the legal action, and that recording artists rarely involve themselves with such matters.

== Track listing ==
- CD single
1. "Kissing You" – 4:56
2. "You Gotta Be" – 4:06
3. "Warm Hands, Cold Heart" – 4:35
4. "Sword of Love" – 4:03
5. "Livin' in the City" (Meme's Extended Club Mix) – 7:46

== Weekly charts ==
Chart (1997–2016)	Peak position
Australia (ARIA)	17
France (SNEP)	90
UK Singles (Official Charts)	83

== Certifications ==
Certifications for "I'm Kissing You"
Region	Certification	Certified units/sales
United Kingdom (BPI)	Silver	200,000^{‡}
^{‡} Sales+streaming figures based on certification alone.
