= Supernatural (Des'ree album) =

Studio album by Des'ree
- Released: 29 June 1998
- Genre: R&B
- Length: 50:58
- Labels: 550; Epic; Sony Soho Square
- Producers: Timothy Atack; Babyface; Des'ree; Ashley Ingram; Peter Lord Moreland & V. Jeffrey Smith; Rick Nowels; Michael Peden; Brian Tench

Des'ree chronology
| I Ain't Movin' (1994) | Supernatural (1998) | Endangered Species (2000) |

Singles from Supernatural
- 1. "Life" Released: 2 June 1998; 2. "What's Your Sign?" Released: 30 September 1998; 3. "God Only Knows" Released: 21 January 1999 (Japan only); 4. "You Gotta Be ('99 Mix)" Released: 22 March 1999

Supernatural is the third studio album by British recording artist Des'ree. Released by 550 Music and Epic Records on 29 June 1998, it follows four years after the singer's previous album, I Ain't Movin'. Predominantly an R&B album, Supernatural received mixed to positive reviews from music critics, who praised Des'ree's voice, but noted that the album lacked memorable songs. The album appeared on several record charts, reaching the top ten in Austria and the Netherlands, and the top twenty in Flanders, France, Norway, Sweden and the United Kingdom.

"Life" was released as the lead single from Supernatural, while "I'm Kissing You" was released as a single for the soundtrack of the 1996 film Romeo + Juliet. "Life" became a major hit for Des'ree and charted well, topping the singles charts of Italy and the Netherlands. Her 1994 hit, "You Gotta Be", was remixed and included as a bonus track in the UK edition of Supernatural, reaching the top 10 in Belgium, Iceland and the United Kingdom, while topping the singles chart of Spain.

== Background ==
Des'ree's previous album, I Ain't Movin', was released in 1994. Its lead single, "You Gotta Be", was a hit in the United States, reaching number five on the Billboard Hot 100. The singer took a four-year break before releasing Supernatural, which she said made her nervous. "But I said to myself, 'I'd rather have that absence and come out with a stunning record than feel the pressure to come out with something earlier and the record be mediocre.'" Polly Anthony, president of 550 Music, said that the record label had been "patiently waiting" for Supernatural, and was comfortable with artists working within their own timeframes.

== Composition ==
Supernatural is an R&B and pop album, and uses acoustic guitar and light basslines. String instruments, percussion and synthesisers are also used. Dayton Daily News' A. M. Jamison wrote, "On Supernatural, Des'ree's voice is the main instrument". It opens with "What's Your Sign?", a song about astrological compatibility. Des'ree says it was written because of her own interest in astrological horoscopes, but she is also "fascinated by people's fascination with it, especially within the [music] industry". In "God Only Knows" Des'ree mentions her overthinking, while in "Life" she sings about superstitions.

== Release and promotion ==
Supernatural was released by Sony Soho^{2} in the UK on 29 June 1998, and by 550 Music and Epic Records in the United States on 11 August 1998. The album was re-issued in Japan on 9 September 1998. This edition contains two bonus tracks – "Warm Hands, Cold Heart" and "Soul Paradise.

"I'm Kissing You" was released as the soundtrack single for Baz Luhrmann's 1996 film Romeo + Juliet on 18 June 1997 and was included on its soundtrack album. It reached number seventeen on the Australian Singles Chart. "Life" was released as the album's lead single in Europe on 2 June 1998 and in the United Kingdom on 8 June. It reached number one on the Ö3 Austria Top 40 and the Dutch Single Top 100, while reaching the top ten in Australia, Belgium, France, Norway, Sweden, Switzerland and the UK. The song "Fire", a duet with Babyface and a cover of the Bruce Springsteen song was released as promotional single in the US on 16 June 1998. A music video was made to accompany the release and it was featured on the Hav Plenty film soundtrack. "What's Your Sign?" was released on 30 September 1998 as the second single from the album. It peaked at number nineteen in the UK, and attained top-fifty places in Austria, France, New Zealand and Switzerland. "God Only Knows" was released as the album's third single only in Japan on 21 January 1999. On 22 March 1999, "You Gotta Be" was released for the third time in the UK because of its use in the 1999 Ford Focus advertising campaign. This version charted within the top 10 of the UK Singles Chart for the first time. Due to the success of this mix, "You Gotta Be" (1999 Mix) replaced "Fire" as the eleventh track on UK physical copies of Supernatural following the re-issue on 14 December 1998.

== Critical reception ==
Supernatural
Review scores
| Source | Rating |
|---|---|
| AllMusic | 2.5/5 stars |
| Robert Christgau | (dud) |
| Entertainment Weekly | B+ |
| The Guardian | 4/5 stars |

AllMusic's Michael Gallucci awarded Supernatural two and a half out of five stars, calling the songs "forgettable" but commending Des'ree's voice. Angela Lewis of The Independent positively reviewed the album, stating that Des'ree is "as gorgeously earthy and organic as she used to be, if not quite as fascinating". Writing for Entertainment Weekly, J. D. Considine noted Supernatural as "exquisitely listenable" and complimented Des'ree's voice for its "depth and complexity". A. M. Jamison from the Dayton Daily News praised Des'ree's optimistic lyrics and described the record as refreshing.

== Commercial reception ==
Supernatural debuted at number 185 on the United States Billboard 200, on the issue dated 5 September 1998. On 12 September it fell to number 187, before slipping off the chart the following week. On the Top R&B Albums appeared at number 72 on the chart of 5 September, moving to number 82 the next issue. In its third week, it jumped to number 73, while its final week on the component chart was spent at number 96 on 26 September 1998. Supernatural sold 50,000 copies in the US, while I Ain't Movin' sold 500,000 and went Gold.

In Europe, Supernatural reached the top ten of album charts in Austria, the Netherlands and Switzerland, and the top twenty in Flanders, France, Norway and Sweden, and number twenty-three in Wallonia. On the UK Albums Chart, it debuted at number sixteen, and spent nine weeks on the chart. In Australia, the album peaked at number twenty-seven, lasting eleven weeks on the chart. In New Zealand, Supernatural appeared at number forty-one on the chart dated 4 October 1998, before falling off the chart.

== Track listing ==
| No. | Title | Writer(s) | Length |
|---|---|---|---|
| 1. | "What's Your Sign?" | Des'ree, Ashley Ingram | 4:07 |
| 2. | "God Only Knows" | Eric Bazilian, Des'ree | 4:44 |
| 3. | "Life" | Des'ree, Prince Sampson | 3:38 |
| 4. | "Best Days" | Des'ree, Sampson | 4:11 |
| 5. | "Proud to Be a Dread" | Des'ree, Michale Graves | 3:57 |
| 6. | "I'm Kissing You" | Timothy Atack, Des'ree | 4:53 |
| 7. | "Indigo Daisies" | Des'ree, Sampson | 6:55 |
| 8. | "Time" | Des'ree, Rick Nowels | 4:13 |
| 9. | "Down by the River" | Des'ree, Sampson | 5:11 |
| 10. | "Darwin Star" | Atack, Des'ree, Sampson | 5:20 |
| 11. | "Fire" (with Babyface) | Bruce Springsteen | 3:49 |
| Total length: | | | 50:58 |

Japanese bonus tracks
| No. | Title | Length |
|---|---|---|
| 11. | "Warm Hands, Cold Heart" | 4:39 |
| 12. | "Soul Paradise" | 4:06 |
| 13. | "Fire" | 3:49 |

UK re-release
| No. | Title | Writer(s) | Length |
|---|---|---|---|
| 11. | "You Gotta Be" (1999 mix) | Des'ree, Ashley Ingram | 4:00 |

== Personnel ==
Credits for Supernatural, adapted from AllMusic:

- Timothy Atack – mixing, production
- Babyface – production
- Paul Buckmaster – conducting, mixing
- Steve "Barney" Cahse – engineering, mixing
- Jason Clift – mixing
- Des'ree – executive production, production, vocals
- Anne Dudley – conducting, mixing
- Simon Hale – conducting, mixing
- Ashley Ingram – conducting, mixing, production
- Steve MacMillan – engineering
- Will Malone – conducting, mixing
- Peter Lord Moreland – production
- Peter Moshay – engineering
- Rick Nowels – production
- Michael Peden – production
- V. Jeffrey Smith – production
- Mario Sorrenti – photography
- Mark "Spike" Stent – mixing
- Brian Tench – engineering, mixing, production

== Charts ==
=== Weekly charts ===
Weekly chart performance for Supernatural
| Chart (1998–1999) | Peak position |
|---|---|
| Australian Albums (ARIA) | 27 |
| Austrian Albums (Ö3 Austria) | 6 |
| Belgian Albums (Ultratop Flanders) | 14 |
| Belgian Albums (Ultratop Wallonia) | 23 |
| Dutch Albums (Album Top 100) | 4 |
| European Top 100 Albums (Music & Media) | 9 |
| French Albums (SNEP) | 16 |
| German Albums (Offizielle Top 100) | 17 |
| Hungarian Albums (MAHASZ) | 35 |
| Italian Albums (FIMI) | 5 |
| Japanese Albums (Oricon) | 16 |
| Malaysian Albums (RIM) | 10 |
| New Zealand Albums (RMNZ) | 41 |
| Norwegian Albums (VG-lista) | 18 |
| Scottish Albums (Official Charts) | 54 |
| Spanish Albums (AFYVE) | 8 |
| Swedish Albums (Sverigetopplistan) | 12 |
| Swiss Albums (Schweizer Hitparade) | 8 |
| UK Albums (Official Charts) | 16 |
| UK R&B Albums (Official Charts) | 7 |
| US Billboard 200 | 185 |
| US Heatseekers Albums (Billboard) | 1 |
| US Top R&B/Hip-Hop Albums (Billboard) | 72 |

=== Year-end charts ===
1998 year-end chart performance for Supernatural
| Chart (1998) | Position |
|---|---|
| German Albums Chart | 82 |

== Certifications ==
| Region | Certification | Certified units/sales |
|---|---|---|
| Belgium (BRMA) | Gold | 25,000^{*} |
| France (SNEP) | Gold | 100,000^{*} |
| Japan (RIAJ) | Platinum | 200,000^{^} |
| Spain (Promusicae) | Platinum | 100,000^{^} |
| Switzerland (IFPI Switzerland) | Gold | 25,000^{^} |
| United Kingdom (BPI) | Gold | 100,000^{*} |
^{*} Sales figures based on certification alone.^{^} Shipments figures based on certification alone.
