= Des'ree =

British pop singer (born 1968)

- Born: Desirée Annette Weekes; 30 November 1968 (age 57); Croydon, London, England
- Genres: R&B; pop; soul; adult contemporary
- Occupations: Singer, songwriter
- Years active: 1991–present
- Labels: Epic Records, Sony Soho Square, 550, Stargazer Records

Desirée Annette Weekes (born 30 November 1968), known by her stage name Des'ree (/ˈdɛz(ə)reɪ/), is a British pop and soul recording artist and songwriter, who rose to prominence during the 1990s. Known for her distinctive contralto voice and uplifting lyrics, Des'ree's biggest hits include the singles "Feel So High", "You Gotta Be", and "Life", as well as the ballad "Kissing You", which featured on the soundtrack of the 1996 film Romeo + Juliet. She was named Best British Female at the 1999 Brit Awards. Her other accolades include an Ivor Novello Award, a World Music Award, and four BMI Awards.

== Early life ==
Des'ree was born in Croydon, South London, on 30 November 1968. Her mother is from Guyana and her father is from Barbados. She was introduced to reggae, calypso, and jazz music by her parents. The family lived in Barbados for three years before returning to the UK when Des'ree was a teenager. Prior to entering the music business, her parents had hoped she would study law at university.

== Career ==
=== 1990s: Career beginnings and international success ===
In 1991, at the age of 22 and with no connections in the music industry, Des'ree was signed to Sony 550, having been encouraged by her then-boyfriend to send a demo tape to the label. Her debut single, "Feel So High", was released in August 1991, just twelve weeks after her signing with Sony. The song did not initially reach the UK top 40, but hit number 13 when it was re-released in January the following year. Her debut album, Mind Adventures, was released in February 1992, peaking at number 26 in the UK. She toured the country with Simply Red in July that same year, featuring as their opening act. In 1993, Des'ree collaborated with Terence Trent D'Arby on the song "Delicate", which hit the UK top 20. Next, she performed for Pope John Paul II at the Vatican City's inaugural concert of secular music, which aired on Italian television in December 1993; the event, Concerto di Natale, has been held with different artists every Christmas in the years since.

In 1994, Des'ree's single "You Gotta Be" entered the Billboard Hot 100, peaking at number 5. It became the most-played music video on VH1 that year, and remained on the Billboard Recurrent Airplay Chart for nineteen months. Released a total of three times in the UK, it finally reached the top 10 in 1999 after a Ford Focus advertising campaign renewed its popularity. Her many live performances of the song include a 1995 episode of Saturday Night Live and the closing ceremony of the 1996 Summer Olympics.

Des'ree's second album, I Ain't Movin', was released in May 1994, selling in excess of 2.5 million copies worldwide and earning positive reviews, with the Chicago Tribune commending its lyrical content and Des'ree's "beautiful, dusky voice". The record's success led to a tour with Seal, which took place across North America between November 1994 and July 1995. Next, she was approached by Australian filmmaker Baz Luhrmann to write a song for the soundtrack of his 1996 romance, Romeo + Juliet. She appeared in a cameo role as "Diva" during one of the film's most iconic sequences, performing said track, "Kissing You", as Leonardo DiCaprio and Claire Danes' characters meet for the first time. "Kissing You" was roundly praised by critics, and went on to receive a Satellite Award nomination for Best Original Song.

In 1997, Des'ree provided vocals for the Steve Winwood track "Plenty Lovin'". The following year, her single "Life" became a hit in Europe, reaching number 1 in many countries, as well as in Japan. In 2007, a BBC Radio 6 listeners' poll declared the song as featuring the "worst lyric in pop", its offending lines being, "I don't want to see a ghost / it's the sight that I fear most / I'd rather have a piece of toast / watch the evening news". The album from which the single was taken, Supernatural, was released in June 1998 to positive reviews, with American music critic J. D. Considine calling it "exquisitely listenable". Supernatural was successful across Europe, hitting the top 5 in Italy and the Netherlands, and peaking at number 16 in the UK. It was less successful in the United States, reaching number 185 on the Billboard 200.

On 16 February 1999, Des'ree was named Best British Female Solo Artist at the Brit Awards. Later that year, she performed The Beatles' song "Blackbird" at Concert for Linda, a charity event in tribute to Linda McCartney, and collaborated with Ladysmith Black Mambazo on their cover of "Ain't No Sunshine", which peaked at number 42 in the UK. She subsequently put her music career on hold to focus on her private life.

=== 2000s–present: Hiatus, other ventures, and return to music ===
Following the 2000 release of Endangered Species, a collection of B-sides and live tracks, Des'ree contributed vocals to the charity single "Wake Up the Morning", which was released in November 2001 to mark the first anniversary of the killing of Damilola Taylor. Next, she performed a sung sonnet from Shakespeare's The Merchant of Venice on the compilation album When Love Speaks. Her fourth album, Dream Soldier, was released in March 2003, with lead single "It's Okay" reaching number 69 in the UK. Dream Soldier was not a commercial or critical success, which led to her parting ways with Sony, instead exploring her interest in naturopathy and training as a nutritionist.

In 2008, Des'ree performed at the O2 Arena for Young Voices' "Big Sing" charity concert, where she helped break the world record for "most people simultaneously singing the same song" by leading 600,000 schoolchildren across the UK in singing her hit, "You Gotta Be". In 2011, she sang a lullaby on the sleep therapy CD, Sleep Talk Lullaby.

Des'ree's first album in sixteen years, A Love Story, was released by her own label, Stargazer Records, on 11 October 2019. She had begun work on the album in 2014, but took an extended break to care for her mother. MusicOMH's Nick Smith awarded it four stars out of five, noting the "subtle beauty and emotional power" of Des'ree's voice, and calling the album "a solid and engaging return".

== Other work ==
"Silent Hero", written by Des'ree and Prince Sampson, featured in Spike Lee's 1995 film Clockers; "Feel So High" (Des'ree, Michael Graves) featured in the 1996 film Set It Off; "Crazy Maze" (Des'ree, Peter Lord Moreland, Vernon Jeffrey Smith) featured in the 1997 film Nothing to Lose; and "You Gotta Be" (Des'ree, Ashley Ingram) featured in both The Next Karate Kid (1994) and The Object of My Affection (1998), as well as the opening sequence number of the 2021 film Cinderella starring Camila Cabello.

== Lawsuits ==
In 1997, Des'ree's hit "Feel So High" was interpolated into the Janet Jackson song "Got 'til It's Gone" (from Jackson's album The Velvet Rope), without due credit being given to Des'ree as a contributor. Subsequent releases containing the track would list Des'ree as one of its writers, following a successful lawsuit against Jackson.

In 2007, Des'ree filed a lawsuit against Beyoncé, claiming that the singer's cover of her song "Kissing You"—retitled "Still in Love (Kissing You)" and featured on the album B'Day—was released without permission. The case was later dismissed, but not before editions of the album featuring the song were pulled from sale.

== Personal life ==
Des'ree is a vegetarian. In 2002, she took courses in photography and ceramics at the Camberwell College of Arts.

== Accolades ==
Billboard Music Awards

Year	Work	Category	Result	Ref.
1995	"You Gotta Be"	Adult Contemporary Single of the Year	Nominated	

BMI London Awards

Year	Work	Category	Result	Ref.
2002	"You Gotta Be"	3 Million Award	Won	
2007	"You Gotta Be"	4 Million Award	Won	
2015	"You Gotta Be"	5 Million Award	Won	

BMI Pop Awards

Year	Work	Category	Result	Ref.
1996	"You Gotta Be"	Song of the Year	Won	

Brit Awards

Year	Work	Category	Result	Ref.
1995	—N/a	British Female Solo Artist	Nominated	
1999	—N/a	British Female Solo Artist	Won	
1999	"Life"	British Single of the Year	Nominated	

Cash Box Year-End Awards

Year	Work	Category	Result	Ref.
1995	—N/a	Top New Female Artist	Nominated	
1995	"You Gotta Be"	Top Pop Single	Nominated	

Ivor Novello Awards

Year	Work	Category	Result	Ref.
1995	"You Gotta Be"	Best Contemporary Song	Won	
1999	"Life"	International Hit of the Year	Nominated	

MTV Video Music Awards

Year	Work	Category	Result	Ref.
1995	—N/a	Best New Artist	Nominated	
1995	"You Gotta Be"	Best Female Video	Nominated	

RSH-Gold Awards

Year	Work	Category	Result	Ref.
1999	"Life"	Catchy Tune of 1998	Won	

Satellite Awards

Year	Work	Category	Result	Ref.
1997	"Kissing You"	Best Original Song	Nominated	

World Music Awards

Year	Work	Category	Result	Ref.
1999	—N/a	World's Best-Selling British Artist	Won	

== Discography ==
=== Albums ===
==== Studio albums ====
Year	Album details	Peak chart positions						Certifications
Year	Album details	UK	AUS	GER	NLD	NZ	US	Certifications
1992	Mind Adventures: Released: 17 February 1992; Label: Sony; Formats: CD, cassette, MD, digital download	26	39	53	57	—	—	UK: Silver; CAN: Gold
1994	I Ain't Movin': Released: 9 May 1994; Label: Sony; Formats: CD, MD, cassette, digital download	13	14	91	77	9	27	UK: Silver; AUS: Gold; NZ: Gold; US: Platinum
1998	Supernatural: Released: 29 June 1998; Label: Sony; Formats: CD, MD, cassette, digital download	16	27	17	4	41	185	UK: Gold; FRA: Gold; JAP: Platinum; SPA: Platinum
2003	Dream Soldier: Released: 31 March 2003; Label: Sony; Formats: CD, cassette, digital download	—	—	—	—	—	—	
2019	A Love Story: Released: 11 October 2019; Label: Stargazer Records; Formats: Digital download	—	—	—	—	—	—	
"—" denotes releases that were not released in that country or did not chart.

==== Compilation albums ====
Title	Album details
Mystic Mixes	Released: 4 August 1999; Label: Sony; Format: CD
Endangered Species	Released: 23 October 2000; Label: Sony; Formats: CD, digital download

=== Singles ===
List of singles released, showing selected chart positions and certifications
Title	Year	Peak chart positions								Certifications	Album
Title	Year	UK	AUS	GER	IRE	ITA	NLD	SPA	US	Certifications	Album
"Feel So High"^{1}	1991	13	28	15	20	—	25	—	67		Mind Adventures
"Mind Adventures"	1992	43	89	94	—	—	—	—	—		Mind Adventures
"Why Should I Love You"	1992	44	102	—	—	—	—	—	—		Mind Adventures
"You Gotta Be"	1994	14	9	79	—	15	47	—	5	UK: Gold; NZ: Gold	I Ain't Movin'
"I Ain't Movin'"	1994	44	59	—	—	—	—	—	—		I Ain't Movin'
"Little Child"	1994	69	210	—	—	—	—	—	—		I Ain't Movin'
"I'm Kissing You"	1997	83	17	—	—	—	—	—	—	UK: Silver	Romeo + Juliet
"Life"	1998	8	8	8	3	1	1	3	—	UK: Gold; AUS: Platinum	Supernatural
"What's Your Sign?"	1998	19	167	65	—	—	70	1	—		Supernatural
"You Gotta Be" (remix)^{3}	1999	10	—	76	—	—	77	1	—		Supernatural
"It's Okay"	2003	69	96	—	—	59	—	—	—		Dream Soldier
"Why?"	2003	—	—	—	—	—	—	—	—		Dream Soldier
"—" denotes releases that were not released in that country or did not chart.

==== Notes ====
- ^{1} "Feel So High" originally peaked at number 51 on the UK singles chart in 1991. It was re-released in 1992 and peaked at number 13. In the US, the single featured on I Ain't Movin' and did not chart until 1995.
- ^{3} "Fire" was included on the 1998 edition of Supernatural as track 11. "You Gotta Be" replaced it when a new edition of the album was released in 1999.

==== As a featured artist ====
Song	Year	Peak chart positions					Album
Song	Year	UK	AUS	GER	IRE	NLD	Album
"Delicate" (Terence Trent D'Arby, featuring Des'ree)	1993	14	99	56	23	45	Symphony or Damn
"Ain't No Sunshine" (Ladysmith Black Mambazo, featuring Des'ree)	1999	42	—	—	—	—	In Harmony
"Wake Up the Morning" (Together As One)	2001	161	—	—	—	—	
"—" denotes releases that were not released in that country or did not chart.

=== Promotional singles ===
Title	Year	Album
"Sun of '79"	1992	Mind Adventures
"Competitive World"	1992	Mind Adventures
"Fire" (with Babyface)	1998	Supernatural
"God Only Knows"	1998	Supernatural
"Best Days"	1999	Supernatural
