= Life (Des'ree song) =

1998 single by Des'ree

Single by Des'ree

from the album Supernatural
- B-side: "Open Mind"; "Get a Life"
- Released: 2 June 1998
- Genre: Pop
- Length: 3:29
- Label: Sony Soho Square; Dusted Sound
- Songwriters: Prince Sampson; Des'ree Weekes
- Producers: Prince Sampson; Des'ree Weekes

Des'ree singles chronology
"I'm Kissing You" (1997)	"Life" (1998)	"What's Your Sign?" (1998)

Audio sample
- Des'ree – "Life": file; help

Music video
- "Life" on YouTube

"Life" is a song by the British pop and soul singer Des'ree. It was the third single from her third album, Supernatural (1998), and was released on 2 June 1998. This song remains Des'ree's biggest hit, peaking at number one in Austria, Hungary, Italy, and the Netherlands, as well as on the UK R&B Singles Chart.

== Lyrics ==
Taking an "innocuous tone", this playful song mixes "stories about superstitions, phobias and travels around the world". The melody is "upbeat and jubilant". However, the lyrics and rhymes have been widely derided, with the song winning the "worst ever pop lyric" in a 2007 BBC poll, particularly for the verse:

I don't want to see a ghost
It's the sight that I fear most
I'd rather have a piece of toast
Watch the evening news

== Critical reception ==
J.D. Considine for Entertainment Weekly wrote in his review of the Supernatural album, "Whether she's testifying to the inner strengths that make her 'Proud to Be a Dread' or rattling off her insecurities in the drolly upbeat 'Life', Des'ree conveys a depth and complexity that go well beyond what's on the lyric sheet."

== Music video ==
A music video was produced to promote the single, directed by Mike Lipscombe. It features the singer sitting on the back seat of a black 1965 Oldsmobile F-85 Cutlass convertible, driven by a chauffeur. Des'ree is initially sheltered from the sun by a black umbrella, which then flies away. The car passes through sugar cane fields as a crop duster flies overhead, but instead of spraying pesticide, it drops many butterflies.

== Track listings ==
- UK CD1
1. "Life" (single version) – 3:28
2. "Open Mind" – 4:19
3. "Get a Life" – 3:32
4. "I'm Kissing You" – 4:52
- UK CD2
1. "Life" (long version) – 4:22
2. "Life" (Cosmack mix) – 4:25
3. "Life" (Cosmack extended mix) – 7:45
4. "Life" (Brooklyn Funk R&B mix—no rap) – 5:00
- UK cassette single
1. "Life" (single version) – 3:28
2. "I'm Kissing You" – 4:52
- European CD single
1. "Life" (single version) – 3:28
2. "Open Mind" – 4:19
- Australian CD single
1. "Life" (single version) – 3:28
2. "Open Mind" – 4:19
3. "Get a Life" – 3:32
4. "Life" (Cosmack mix) – 4:25
5. "Life" (Cosmack extended mix) – 7:45
- Japanese CD single
1. "Life" (single version)
2. "Open Mind"
3. "Get a Life"

== Charts ==
=== Weekly charts ===
1998 weekly chart performance for "Life"
Chart (1998)	Peak position
Australia (ARIA)	8
Austria (Ö3 Austria Top 40)	1
Belgium (Ultratop 50 Flanders)	2
Belgium (Ultratop 50 Wallonia)	3
Denmark (IFPI)	5
Europe (Eurochart Hot 100)	1
France (SNEP)	2
Germany (GfK)	8
Hungary (Mahasz)	1
Iceland (Íslenski Listinn Topp 40)	6
Ireland (IRMA)	3
Italy (Musica e dischi)	1
Italy Airplay (Music & Media)	1
Japan (Oricon)	37
Netherlands (Dutch Top 40)	1
Netherlands (Single Top 100)	1
New Zealand (Recorded Music NZ)	21
Norway (VG-lista)	9
Scottish Singles Sales (Official Charts)	18
Spain (AFYVE)	3
Sweden (Sverigetopplistan)	3
Switzerland (Schweizer Hitparade)	3
UK Singles (Official Charts)	8
UK Hip Hop/R&B (Official Charts)	1

2024 weekly chart performance for "Life"
Chart (2024)	Peak position
Kazakhstan Airplay (TopHit)	48

=== Year-end charts ===
1998 year-end chart performance for "Life"
Chart (1998)	Position
Australia (ARIA)	38
Austria (Ö3 Austria Top 40)	7
Belgium (Ultratop 50 Flanders)	22
Belgium (Ultratop 50 Wallonia)	17
Europe (Eurochart Hot 100)	8
France (SNEP)	11
Germany (Media Control)	27
Iceland (Íslenski Listinn Topp 40)	49
Italy (Musica e dischi)	5
Netherlands (Dutch Top 40)	6
Netherlands (Single Top 100)	7
Sweden (Hitlistan)	21
Switzerland (Schweizer Hitparade)	12
UK Singles (OCC)	66

2024 year-end chart performance for "Life"
Chart (2024)	Position
Kazakhstan Airplay (TopHit)	97

=== Decade-end charts ===
Chart (1990–1999)	Position
Netherlands (Dutch Top 40)	29

== Certifications ==
Certifications and sales for "Life"
Region	Certification	Certified units/sales
Australia (ARIA)	Platinum	70,000^{^}
Austria (IFPI Austria)	Gold	25,000^{*}
Belgium (BRMA)	Platinum	50,000^{*}
France (SNEP)	Platinum	500,000^{*}
Germany (BVMI)	Gold	250,000^{^}
Italy (FIMI)	Gold	35,000^{‡}
Japan (RIAJ)	Gold	50,000^{^}
Netherlands (NVPI)	Platinum	75,000^{^}
Spain (Promusicae)	Gold	30,000^{‡}
Sweden (GLF)	Platinum	30,000^{^}
Switzerland (IFPI Switzerland)	Gold	25,000^{^}
United Kingdom (BPI)	Gold	400,000^{‡}
^{*} Sales figures based on certification alone.^{^} Shipments figures based on certification alone.^{‡} Sales+streaming figures based on certification alone.

== Release history ==
Release dates and formats for "Life"
Region	Date	Format(s)	Label(s)	Ref.
Europe	2 June 1998	CD	Sony Soho Square; Dusted Sound	
United Kingdom	8 June 1998	CD; cassette	Sony Soho Square; Dusted Sound	
Japan	10 June 1998	CD	Epic Japan	
United States	28 July 1998	Rhythmic contemporary; contemporary hit radio	550 Music	
